= List of Unified Payments Interface applications =

Nickname This is a list of applications supporting the Unified Payments Interface (UPI), an Indian instant payment system as well as protocol developed by the National Payments Corporation of India (NPCI) in 2016. The interface facilitates inter-bank peer-to-peer (P2P) and person-to-merchant (P2M) transactions.

== Third-party Apps ==
App Name	Developer	Handle		Supports				Launch Year
App Name	Company	Backing Bank	Handle	Banks	Platform	Custom UPI Name	Additional Features	Launch Year
Amazon Pay	Amazon	RBL Bank	@rapl	All UPI Banks	Android /iPhone			Jan 2019
Amazon Pay	Amazon	Axis Bank	@apl	All UPI Banks				Jan 2019
Amazon Pay	Amazon	Yes Bank	@yapl	All UPI Banks				Jan 2019
BHIM	NPCI BHIM Services Limited			All UPI Banks	Android /iPhone			
Cred	Dreamplug Technologies Private Limited			All UPI Banks	Android /iPhone			
FiMoney		Federal Bank	@fifederal		Android /iPhone			
Hero Digital Lending & UPI App	Hero FinCorp	Axis Bank	@hfaxis	All UPI Banks	Android /iPhone			April 2026
Google Pay	Google			All UPI Banks	Android /iPhone	Only first time		
Groww	Nextbillion Technology	Yes Bank	@yesg	All UPI Banks	Android /iPhone			Oct 2022
PhonePe	Walmart	Yes Bank	@ybl	All UPI Banks	Android /iPhone	Only first time	Nickname for Accounts	
Paytm	One97 Communications			All UPI Banks	Android /iPhone			

== Bank Apps ==
App Name	Bank	Handle	Supported Banks	Platform	Custom UPI Name	Additional Features	Launch Year
CSB Pay	CSB Bank	@csbpay		Android /iPhone			
FedMobile	Federal Bank	@federal	Federal Bank	Android /iPhone	App Suggests		
Paytm	One97 Communications		All UPI Banks	Android /iPhone			
Simply Pay	HSBC	@hsbc	HSBC ICICI HDFC	Android /iPhone	Yes		
