= Thai QR Payment =

QR payment method in Thailand

National ITMX Co., Ltd.
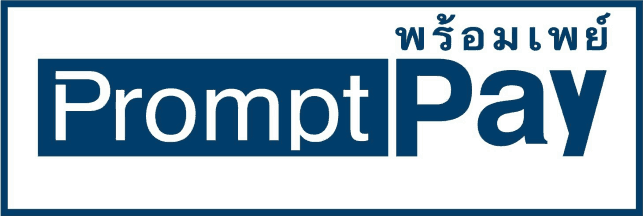
- Trade name: PromptPay
- Formerly: ATM Pool ltd
- Type: Private
- Industry: Finance and Payment; QR code payment
- Headquarters: 5/13 Moo 3 Klong Khua Subdistrict Pa Kret District Nonthaburi Thailand 11120
- Area served: Thailand (officially); ASEAN Nations (unofficial support)
- Website: www.itmx.co.th

A bakery shop in Bangkok with a PromptPay QR code on the left

Thai QR Payment or PromptPay (พร้อมเพย์) is a real-time payment system in Thailand that allows money transfers through digital channels using identifiers linked to a bank account, including a mobile phone number, citizen identification number, tax identification number or bank account number. PromptPay allows users to transfer money through digital banking channels using identifiers such as a mobile phone number, citizen identification number, or bank account number instead of only using traditional bank account details.

The system was introduced in 2016 as part of Thailand's national e-payment infrastructure and was developed under the National e-Payment Master Plan, a government programme intended to expand digital payment infrastructure and reduce the use of cash in everyday transactions. It is owned by National ITMX Co., Ltd and Bank of Thailand and developed by Vocalink, a group by Mastercard

== History ==
PromptPay (originally AnyID) is one of the National e-Payment projects and policies by Thailand, to regulate and standardize electronic payments to follow the technologies with internet and smartphones that is expanding and bringing technology into Finance and Commerce. By 22 December 2015, The First Prayut cabinet have approved the project as a national infastructure

Public use began in 2017, when Thailand introduced the service as a lower-cost electronic interbank transfer system. The World Bank described PromptPay as Thailand's fast payment system, with National ITMX operating the service and the Bank of Thailand acting as overseer and supervisor.

PromptPay is used for person-to-person transfers, government payments, and merchant payments through QR codes. It is supported by participating banks and financial institutions in Thailand. In 2017, Bangkok Post reported that the service had reached 48 billion baht in accumulated transaction value, based on Bank of Thailand data.

PromptPay has also been used in cross-border payment linkages with other real-time payment systems in Southeast Asia. In April 2021, the Monetary Authority of Singapore and the Bank of Thailand launched a linkage between Singapore's PayNow and Thailand's PromptPay, allowing customers of participating banks to send money between the two countries using a mobile phone number.

In June 2021, the central banks of Thailand and Malaysia launched a cross-border QR payment linkage between PromptPay and Malaysia's DuitNow system.

== Services ==
PromptPay's Services have included

- Encrypted Transactions and Payment between Two Individuals (C2C)
- Government Infrastructure Payment
- Tax Returns
- Individual PromptPay
- e-Wallet
- Thai QR Payment
- Pay Alert
- e-Donation
- Cross Border QR Payment

=== Cross-border payments ===
PromptPay has been linked with payment systems in other countries. In April 2021, the Monetary Authority of Singapore and the Bank of Thailand launched a linkage between Singapore's PayNow and Thailand's PromptPay, allowing real-time cross-border transfers between the two countries. The Bank of Thailand has also listed PromptPay under its cross-border payment linkages, including QR payment links for travellers and merchants.

== See also ==
- PayNow
- QR code payment
- Real-time payment
- Bank of Thailand
