= QR code payment =

Barcode-based mobile payment method

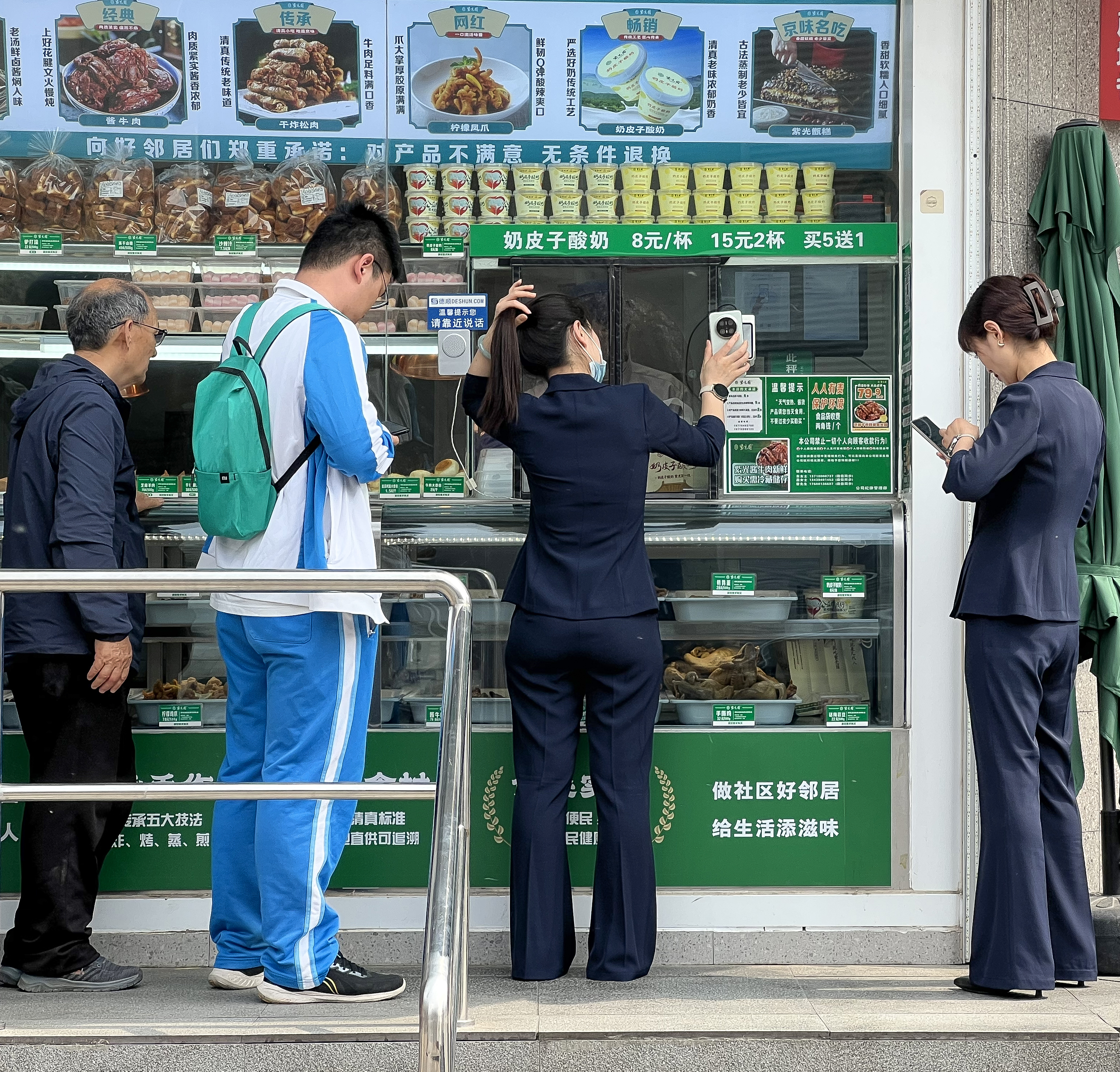
A customer presenting her payment QR code to the scanning device of the merchant for transaction in Beijing, China

A QR code payment is a mobile payment method where payment is performed by scanning a QR code from a mobile app. This is an alternative to doing electronic funds transfer at point of sale using a payment terminal. This avoids a lot of the infrastructure traditionally associated with electronic payments such as payment cards, payment networks, payment terminal and merchant accounts.

To make a QR code payment, the consumer scans the QR code displayed by the merchant with their smartphone to pay for their goods. They enter the amount they have to pay and finally submit. This is a more secure card-not-present method than others.

== History ==
The QR code system was invented in 1994 by Masahiro Hara from the Japanese company Denso Wave.

In December 2010, the first documented description of QR code-based payments came from two patents filed by Shaun Cooley and Andrew Charles Payne, based on a prototype system developed for Norton Labs at Symantec called Norton Mobile Pay. US 8177125 describes a payment mechanism where a website displays a QR code and a mobile device's camera is used to read the code and complete the payment. US 9076171 describes payment mechanisms where a payment terminal displays a QR code that is scanned by a mobile device, a mobile device displays a QR code that is scanned by a payment terminal, and a mobile device displaying a QR code that is scanned by another mobile device. There are no records of Symantec, Gen Digital, CA Technologies, or Broadcom attempting to enforce these patents in court.

In March 2011, the first mobile wallet app for cryptocurrency Bitcoin featured the ability to send and receive payments with QR codes.

In 2011, Chinese company Alipay designed a QR code payment method which allowed partnering offline stores to accept payment by scanning an individual's QR code in Alipay Wallet. In 2014, Chinese technology company Tencent introduced a similar feature on its messaging app WeChat to allow its users to make QR code payments. QR code payments helped mobile payments become the most popular method of payments in China, accounting for 83% of all payments by 2018. Nearly all shops, street vendors, most metro systems, buses, and taxis in Mainland China accept either WeChat Pay, Alipay, or UnionPay's Cloud QuickPass for payment.

In 2012, the Czech branch of Raiffeisen Bank International developed the Short Payment Descriptor format for exchanging payment information via QR codes. The format was soon adopted by other Czech banks as well as the Czech Banking Association as the national standard for QR code payments. SPD can technically be used with any bank using IBAN account numbers, although in practice it is only used within Czechia.

In 2017, the National Payments Corporation of India (NPCI) launched BharatQR as a single, interoperable QR code that could be used for making payments to and from bank accounts using UPI and wallets. It works alongside QR codes from wallet providers as well as card providers such as Visa's mVisa and Mastercard's Masterpass.

In 2020, PayPal announced the ability to pay with QR codes in its mobile app.

In 2023, Bangla QR is Bangladesh's national, interoperable QR code payment system launched by Bangladesh Bank to unify digital transactions. It allows customers to make instant payments from any participating bank or Mobile Financial Service (MFS) app using a single, universal QR code, eliminating the need for merchants to display multiple codes.

== Usage in the transportation industry by country ==
=== China ===
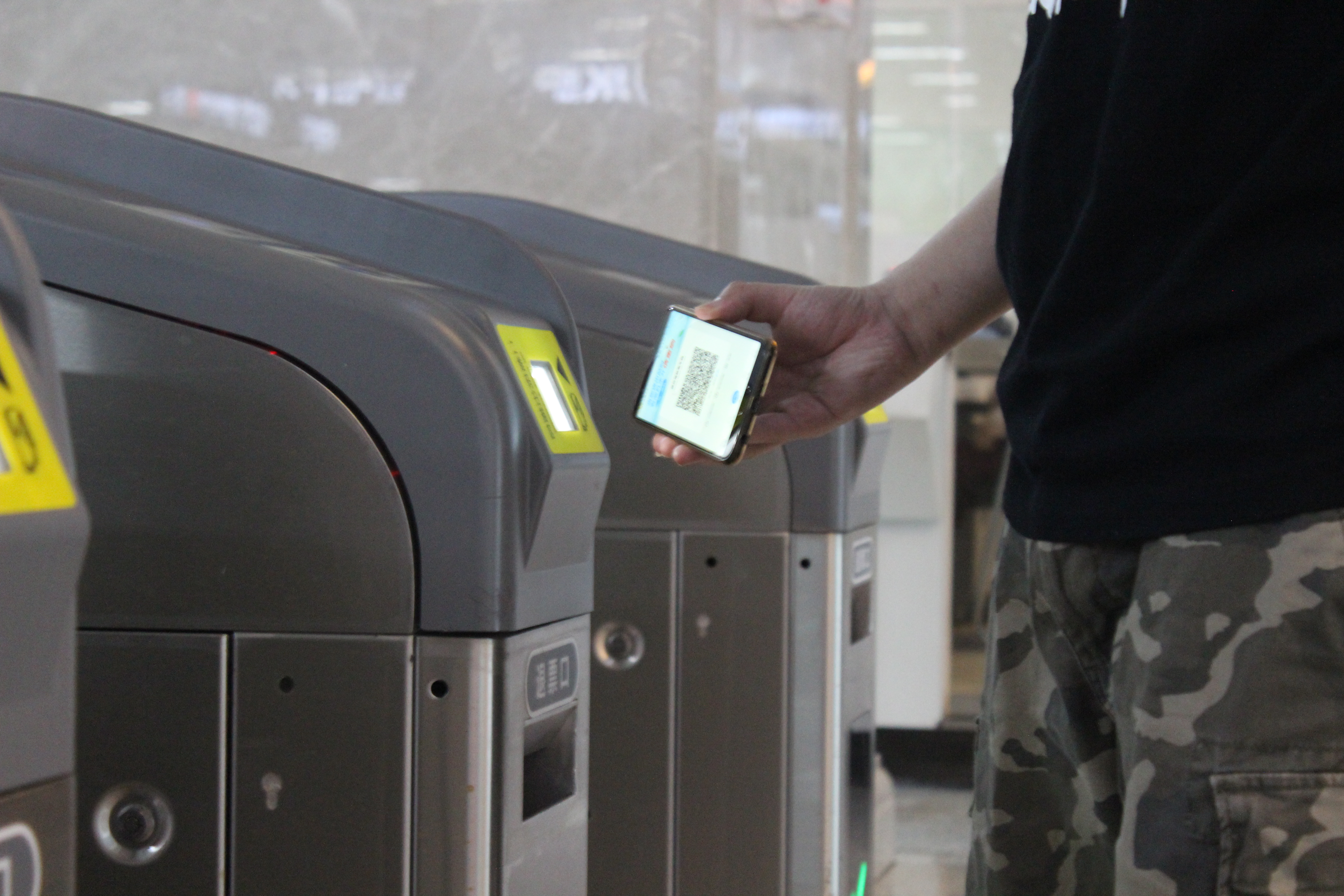
Wuhan Metro introduced QR code payments across the whole network

Most metro systems, buses, and taxis in Mainland China accept either WeChat Pay or Alipay for payment. The national railway operator, China Railway, also accepts the two major apps for payment.

=== Hungary ===
qvik enables payment within Hungarian National Bank's Instant payment system (AFR) by scanning a QR code, approving a payment request, NFC-based touch or clicking on a deep link within a mobile application. In addition to offering the same fast and secure payment as credit card systems for both purchases and bill payments, qvik is free for consumers and significantly cheaper for merchants than existing payment methods. Using qvik ensures payment security as the service is operated by Hungarian companies and user data remains within the country's borders.

=== India ===
Line 1 of the Mumbai Metro in India allows users to purchase a ticket on their phones using QR code payments. Instead of swiping an RFID card or single-use token, a QR code is generated on the Paytm app which is then read by a scanner mounted on the turnstile.

=== Malaysia ===
QR code payment is becoming increasingly popular recently in Malaysia as a convenient and secure way to pay for transportation services. KTM ETS and KTM Komuter Northern Sector, as well as KLIA Ekspres and Penang Ferry Service, are all offering QR code payments to their passengers.

As Malaysia continues to modernize its transportation infrastructure, it is likely that more services including Rapid KL will adopt QR code payments to enhance the passenger experience and streamline operations.

=== Philippines ===
QR code tickets, named beep QR, were introduced in LRT-1 on 1 June 2023 by AF Payments, Inc., the operator of beep card, in partnership with Maya, an e-wallet app. QR tickets can be bought on the Maya app or ikotMNL app. Each LRT-1 station is equipped with at least 1 QR code-enabled gate.

=== Indonesia ===
Indonesia has adopted a QR code payment system in the transportation sector to improve convenience and efficiency for commuters. Jakarta's MRT and TransJakarta bus systems now support payment via QR Code Indonesian Standard (QRIS). This promotes a cashless society and mobile payments in Indonesia.

== Integrated QR code payment systems ==
Various integrated QR code payment systems in Asia

The integrated QR code payment system (also known as a unified, national, standard, or common QR code) is a type of payment system that employs a standardized QR code format, enabling interoperability among multiple banks and e-wallet providers. This system allows consumers to make transactions by scanning a single QR code, regardless of the issuing institution of their payment app. This system typically shares the following characteristics:

- Using the EMVCo standards.
- Operates through each country's domestic switching system, independent from global networks such as SWIFT, VISA, or MasterCard.
- Developed and owned by each country's central bank and/or government authority.
- Interoperability, allowing a single QR code to be scanned by various mobile banking or e-wallet apps.
- Availability as an additional feature within existing mobile banking or e-wallet apps, rather than as standalone apps.
- Availability for P2B (person-to-business/merchant) transactions, with optional support for P2P, P2G (person-to-government), B2B, B2G (business-to-government), etc.
- Availability in both static and dynamic QR code formats.
- Cross-border transactions compatibility, enabling foreign tourists to use their home country's apps while abroad (e.g., Malaysian tourists using DuitNow to scan SGQR+ while in Singapore and vice versa).

=== ASEAN Integrated QR Code Payment System ===
This integrated QR code payment system allows people to make transactions with banks or e-money that supports their local integrated QR code payment system in any of the participating countries. The ASEAN Integrated QR Code Payment System is part of ASEAN Local Currency Transaction (LCT) Framework, an initiave aimed at using local currencies and reduced dependence on certain currencies, particularly the US dollar, in cross-border transaction among ASEAN countries. Local currencies are used, meaning that transactions in Thailand using an Indonesian payment app will directly exchange rupiah with baht. Currently, four of the QR code payment systems in ASEAN are connected (Indonesia, Malaysia, Singapore and Thailand). Philippines are also planning to integrate their QR payment systems.

On 30 June 2024, the four ASEAN central banks, Central Bank of Malaysia, Bank of Thailand, Bangko Sentral ng Pilipinas, and Monetary Authority of Singapore, together with the Reserve Bank of India and the Bank for International Settlements signed an agreement as founding members of Project Nexus, a multilateral international initiative aimed at enabling retail cross-border payments. Bank Indonesia participated as a special observer until February 2026 when it joined as a full member. The platform, which is expected to go live by 2026, will interlink domestic fast payment systems of the member countries.

As of April 2025, all ASEAN member states have launched their unified QR code payment systems, except for Brunei and Timor-Leste. The following are QR Payment systems that are in or soon will be in the integrated payment system.

==== DuitNow QR ====
DuitNow (launched in December 2018) allows all participating banks and e-wallets in Malaysia to use the same QR Code for transactions. It is launched by PayNet under the Bank Negara Malaysia's Interoperable Credit Transfer Framework (ICTF). Some of the banks and e-wallets that support this payment system are Maybank, Hong Leong Bank, CIMB, HSBC, Touch 'n Go eWallet, GrabPay, Setel, ShopeePay, OCBC, UOB, ICBC, and more.

==== KHQR ====
KHQR is Cambodia national QR payment standard part of Bakong System launched on 26 June 2020. KHQR is developed by National Bank of Cambodia and Soramitsu (Japanese-Swiss fintech company).

==== LAO QR ====
LAO QR is a unified QR payment system in Laos. The Bank of the Lao PDR held an official launch of LAO QR on 29 January 2020.

==== MMQR ====
MyanmarPay (MMQR) is a unified QR code payment system in Myanmar. MyanmarPay owned and regulated by the Central Bank of Myanmar and operated by PayPlus Co., Ltd.

==== QR Ph ====
QR Ph is the QR code standard in the Philippines, approved by the Philippines Payment Management, inc. (PPMI) in accordance with circular 1055 of the Bangko Sentral ng Pilipinas. The system is based on the Europay-Mastercard-VISA (EMVCo) standard, allowing one QR Code to serve transactions from different banks and e-wallets.

==== QRIS (Quick Response Code Indonesian Standard) ====
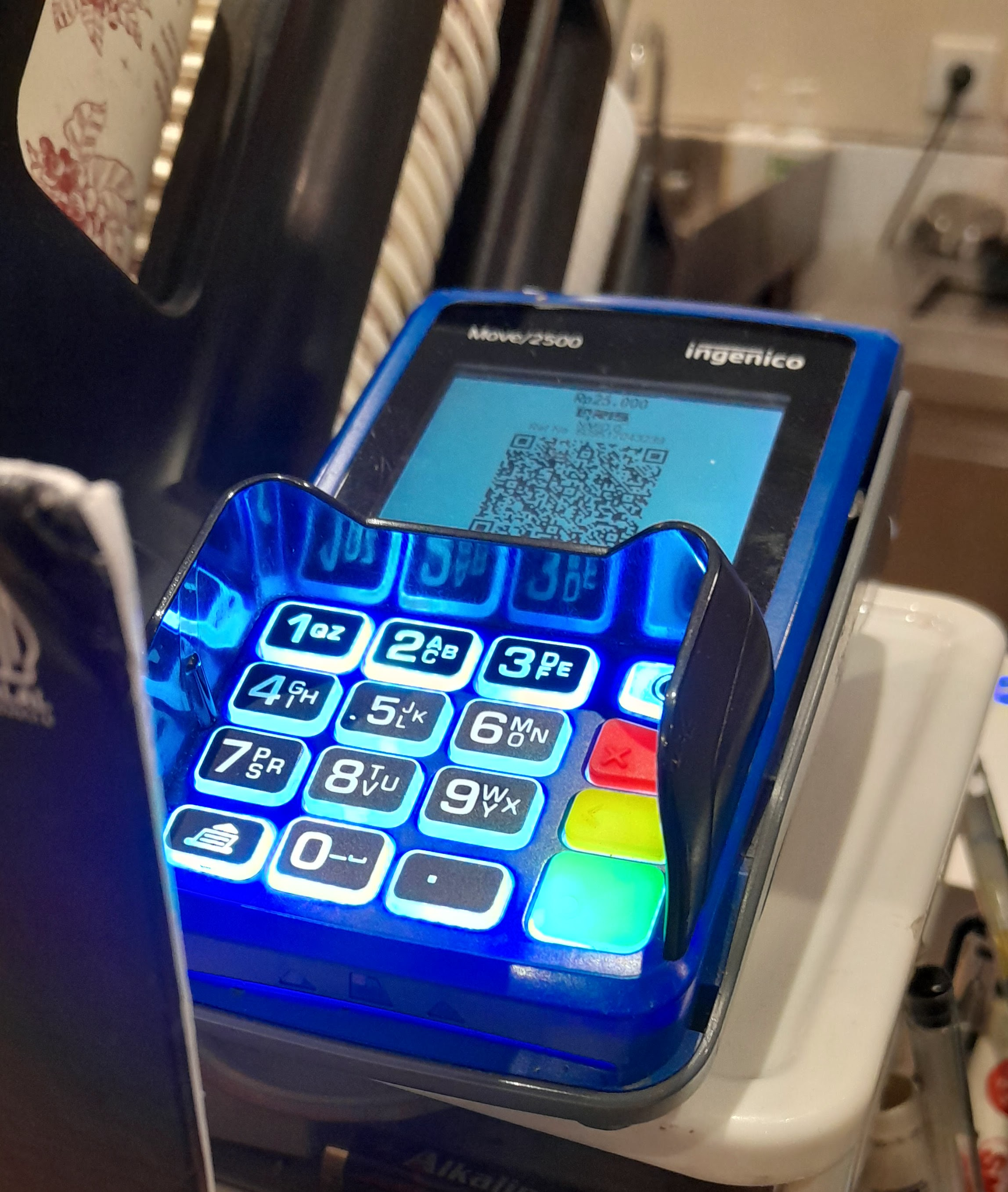
An Ingenico Move/2500 payment terminal showing QRIS QR code

QRIS (launched in August 2019) is a standardized national QR payment system for Indonesia launched by Bank Indonesia on 17 August 2019. All payment services in Indonesia required to support QRIS, this include GoPay, OVO, Dana, ShopeePay, BCA, BNI, BRI, Mandiri, BSI, UOB Indonesia, DBS Indonesia, CIMB Indonesia, SeaBank, etc. It combines all the separate QR codes from different payment services into one QR code which can be used by merchants to receive payments from any e-wallets or banks that supports QRIS.

==== SGQR+ ====
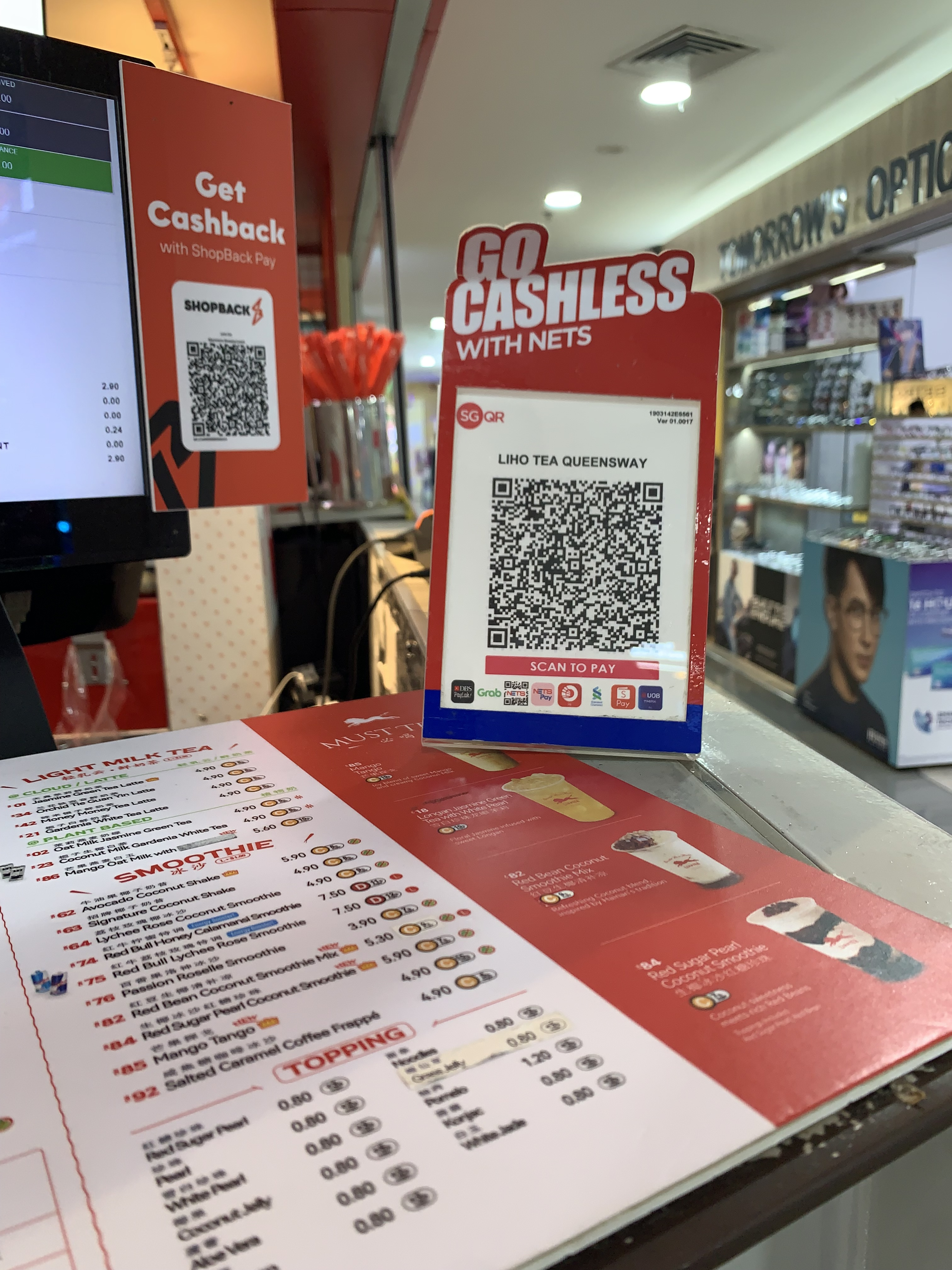
A sign of SGQR payment at a store in Queensway Shopping Centre, Singapore

SGQR (Singapore Quick Response Code) is a unified QR code payment system launched on 17 September 2018. SGQR combines multiple QR codes used by multiple payment services in Singapore, including PayNow, into one QR code. This scheme is co-owned by MAS and IMDA. SGQR+ is the successor of SGQR, it supports interoperability and cross-border function.

==== Thai QR Payment ====
Thai QR Payment (Promptpay) (launched in August 2017) integrates QR payment systems in Thailand. It was launched by the Bank of Thailand.

==== VietQR ====
VietQR is the national QR code payment standard for Vietnam, launched as a collaborative effort by the National Payment Corporation of Vietnam (NAPAS) in partnership with several major banks, including Vietcombank, BIDV, VietinBank, and Agribank. Introduced to the public in 2021, VietQR aims to streamline digital transactions across various financial platforms by using a unified QR code format that supports interoperability among different banks and e-wallets.

=== Integrated QR code payment system in the rest of Asia ===
==== Bangla QR ====
Bangla QR is launched by Bangladesh Bank, the central bank of Bangladesh. At launch, 10 banks — Dutch-Bangla Bank, Mutual Trust Bank, AB Bank, Eastern Bank, Islami Bank Bangladesh, United Commercial Bank, City Bank, Bank Asia, Pubali Bank, and One Bank — as well as Mastercard, Visa, American Express, and mobile payments providers bKash, Rocket, and Islami Bank's mCash are supporting the service.

The Interoperable Instant Payment System is also on its way to become one unified payment system for all Bangladeshi banks and fintech startup's.

In 2025, every trade license in Bangladesh started to require a Bangla QR transaction option.

==== ELQR ====
ELQR is an integrated QR payment system in Kyrgyzstan. ELQR was launched in May 2022. ELQR is the first integrated QR payment system in Central Asia. Currently ELQR supports Elcard, Mbank, RSK24, DemirBank, ElSom, Bakai Bank, NambaOne, Kompanion, Halyk Bank, Ayl Bank, Finca Bank, O!Dengi, Balance, KKB, KSB, and MegaPay.

==== JPQR ====
JPQR, promoted by the Ministry of Internal Affairs and Communications and the Ministry of Economy, Trade and Industry, is a cashless method that allows one QR code to be used for many payment services. JPQR unifies various QR code payments that already exist in Japan.

==== LankaQR ====
LankaQR is Sri Lanka's national QR code payment system, first introduced in 2018. The standardized system promotes cashless transactions and enhances financial inclusion, especially for small merchants. Compliant with global EMV standards, LankaQR enables seamless interoperability between banks and payment providers, allowing merchants to accept payments from any participating institution through a unified QR code solution.

==== NEPALPAY ====
NEPALPAY QR launched by NCHL as the implementing infrastructure of NepalQR standards published by Nepal Rastra Bank and as part of the National Payment Switch. It establishes and operates national QR scheme/network and internetwork transaction & settlement. NEPALPAY QR works as an independent QR scheme and allows QR interoperability at merchant level and network level.

==== UPI ====
UPI (Unified Payment Interface) is a unified instant payment system developed by the National Payments Corporation of India, launched on 25 August 2016 and was backed by 35 banks across the country in the first year of its launch. Multiple startups like Paytm who were providing digital wallets for customers and merchants, along with new market players like PhonePe quickly got into the scene, with them incorporating new merchants by providing QR based payment solutions, along with QR code scanners for customers in their respective mobile apps which resulted in the widespread use of QR based payments in India. In FY 2023, there were 84 billion UPI transactions, accounting to about Rs 139.09 trillion ($1.67 trillion). Singapore, UAE, Nepal, Bhutan, France and Sri Lanka have also started adopting UPI after seeing its success in India.

=== Integrated QR code payment system in Africa ===
==== GhQR ====
GhQR (Ghana QR code payment) is Ghana's standardized QR code payment system launched by the Ghana Interbank Payment and Settlement Systems (GhIPSS). It is designed to promote cashless payments and enable interoperable QR code transactions across various banks, fintechs, and mobile money operators in Ghana.

=== Integrated QR code payment system in Europe ===
==== Swish ====
Swish is a mobile payment system in Sweden, launched in 2012 by six large Swedish banks, in cooperation with Bankgirot and the Central Bank of Sweden. It allows users to make instant payments by scanning a QR code.

==== EPC QR ====
EPC QR is a standardized 2D barcode format that encodes SEPA payment information (beneficiary IBAN, amount, reference) allowing customers to scan it with their banking app to initiate an instant bank transfer. The European Payments Council (EPC) published the EPC QR code guidelines in February 2013, though the predecessor STUZZA standard originated in Austria in 2012. EPC QR is strongest in Germany/Belgium/Austria/Finland. It's weak or non-existent in Scandinavia because they prefer local systems (Vipps in Norway, Swish in Sweden, MobilePay in Denmark).

=== Integrated QR code payment system in the Americas ===
==== CoDi and PIM ====
CoDi (Spanish: Plataforma de Cobros Digitales) is a standard mobile QR payment in Mexico created by the Bank of Mexico. It was launched in September 2019 and has 14 million users. PIM (Spanish: Pagos Interoperables Móviles) is a private-sector initiative in Mexico that enables interoperable mobile payments between banks and fintech digital wallets, developed by Mexican Bankers Association (ABM) and private sector banks. While CoDi integrates banks and can only be used for participating members of CoDi only, PIM unifies CoDi, e-wallets, and banks outside of CoDi.

==== Pix ====
Pix is a unified instant payment system developed by the Central Bank of Brazil. Pix allows instant payment between individuals and among individuals, companies, and the government (P2P, P2B, B2B, P2G, and B2G). Pix supports both QR static and dynamic.

== See also ==
- Short Payment Descriptor
- EPC QR code
- QR code
