= Manish Bardia =

Indian ad filmmaker

- Born: Ahmedabad, Gujarat
- Occupation: Ad filmmaker

Manish Bardia is an Indian ad filmmaker based in Ahmedabad, Gujarat, India.

== Early life and education ==
Bardia grew up in a business family from Sardar Shehar in Rajasthan. In 1990, Bardia completed his Commercial Art course from the CN Institute of Fine Arts, Ahmedabad.

== Career ==
Bardia moved to Mumbai and started his career with an advertising agency. A year later, he moved back to Ahmedabad and founded his production house Moving Pixels Company. Bardia is the Chief Managing Director (CMD) of the company with a team of 130 members.

In the following years, he worked for local cable networks and corporates. Bardia was approached by the Indian Space Research Organization (ISRO) for a project on the PSLV launch. Bardia has helped create campaigns like Rang Gujarat Ke (Colors of Gujarat) for the Vibrant Gujarat Summit 2019 and the Swachh Bharat Mission for Prime Minister Narendra Modi. He has worked on advertising campaigns for brands such as BHIM and Adani Group. Bardia has also worked on television commercials for Bhartiya Janata Party (BJP) and the website for the party’s poll theme Jeetega Gujarat.
