= Instant payment =

Method of exchanging money and processing payments

Instant payment (sometimes referred to as real-time payment or faster payment) is a method of electronic funds transfer, allowing for almost immediate transfer of money between bank accounts. This was in contrast to the previous transfer times of one to three business days that had been in place until the mid-2010s.

Since the mid-2010s many countries have implemented instant payment systems that speed up the transfer between bank accounts in response to customer demand for faster transactions.

The Euro Retail Payments Board (ERPB) in 2018 defined instant payments as:

Electronic retail payment solutions available 24/7/365 and resulting in the immediate or close-to-immediate interbank clearing of the transaction and crediting of the payee’s account with confirmation to the payer (within seconds of payment initiation).

== History ==
Originally clearing of payments was based on the cheque clearing cycle that required physical cheques to be exchanged by banks at clearing houses for payments to be made between bank accounts. When electronic payments entered the banking systems from the 1970s onwards, the same timeframes and processes were used to settle these electronic payments.

The growth of e-commerce since the 2000s has caused a change in people's spending patterns and expectations. Shopping is no longer confined to regular business hours, creating new challenges for funds transfers. Similarly, merchants require faster and more reliable money transfer systems to keep up with consumers' demands.

Traditional electronic payments like bank transfers, that perform the electronic funds transfers within a few business days, are not in line with user expectations.

In 2024, EU adopted Instant Payment Regulation, aiming to accelerate instant payments in Europe. For EU member states operating in euro it partially took effect in January 2025, for non-euro member states it will partially take effect in January 2027. This regulation includes requirements to send and receive transfers within 10 seconds (SEPA Instant Credit Transfer), as well as to implement the Verification of Payee service. The Verification of Payee allows payment service providers (PSPs) to verify the IBAN and the name of the payee as given by the payer. It will help to reduce scams and incorrect transfers. The regulation also allowed non-bank financial institutions access central bank-operated payment systems like TARGET. This opened an access to several SEPA services for fintechs and neobanks in Europe.

== Notable instant payment systems by country ==
Name	Country	Launched	Payment Sources	Identifiers	Notable Features	Transaction Volume per year (in billions)
New Payments Platform (NPP)	Australia	2018	Bank Account	PayID (Phone number, email or Australian Business Number)	Recurring Payments	1.2 (2022)
Wero	Belgium; France; Germany	2024	Bank account	Mobile Number; QR Code	Cross-border instant payment	
Interoperable Instant Payment System (IIPS)	Bangladesh	2025	Bank account, net bankings	QR code, Mobile number, IIPS ID	Instant Payment System	N/A
Pix	Brazil	2020	Bank Account	QR Code; Email; Mobile Number; Pix Key/Alias	Recurring Payments (Pix Automático)Get change as cash at merchants (Pix Troco); Cash withdrawal (Pix Saque)	42 (2023)
Bre-B	Colombia	2025	Bank Account; Cooperative	QR Code; ID Number; Mobile Number; Email; Alias	Instant Payment System; ATM withdrawal Recurring Payments	
Internet Banking Payment System (IBPS)	China	2010	Bank Account e-wallet	QR Code; Mobile Number	Recurring Payments	16.98 (2023)
Vipps and MobilePay	Denmark (Note: including Faroe Islands and Greenland); Finland (Note: including Åland Islands); Norway; Sweden	2013 (MP); 2015 (Vipps)	Debit/Credit Card; Bank Account	Mobile Number	Common app for users of all banks Ability to chat.	1.52 (2024)
TARGET Instant Payment Settlement (TIPS)	EU	2018	IBAN			0.23 (2023)
Instant Payment Network	Egypt	2022	Bank Account, Meeza Prepaid Card	Instant Payment Address (IPA); Mobile Number; Card Number; Bank Account Number; IBAN; QR Code; URL	Unified app for inter-bank transfers Send money requests	1.5 (2024)
Faster Payment System (FPS)	Hong Kong	2018	e-wallet Bank Account	QR Code; Mobile Number Email FPS ID	Supports both Hong Kong Dollar & Chinese Yuan Renminbi	0.531 (2023)
Azonnali Fizetési Rendszer (AFR)	Hungary	2020	Bank account	Bank Account Number; Mobile Number; Email; Tax Number		
Unified Payments Interface (UPI)	India	2016	Bank Account; Prepaid Wallet; Credit Card; Credit Line; CBDC Stored Value	QR Code; NFC; UPI ID; Mobile Number; Sound Pattern; Bank Account Number with IFSC	Recurring Payments (UPI AutoPay); Foreign Inward Remittance; Payments without Internet/Network (UPI Lite X); Feature phone compatibility UPI OneWorld (for tourists); ATM Withdrawal; International Payments; Distributed by ecosystem of apps, some of which provide value added features like chat Apps allow linking multiple payment sources, from all service providers in a unified manner	117.6 (2023)
Immediate Payment Service (IMPS)	India	2010	Bank Account	Mobile Money Identifier (MMID); Bank Account Number with IFSC.	Foreign Inward Remittance (FIR)	5.8 (2023)
Quick Response Code Indonesia Standard (QRIS)	Indonesia	2019	e-Wallet; Bank account	QR Code		2.57 (2024)
ZENGIN	Japan	1973	Bank Account	Account Number	Inward Remittance	3 (2023)
CliQ	Jordan	2020	Bank Account	IBAN; Account number Alias		0.03 (2023)
Sistema de Pagos Electrónicos Interbancarios (SPEI) (lit. 'Interbanking Electronic Payment System')	Mexico	2004	Bank Account	CLABE number	Instant Payment System	N/A
Raast	Pakistan	2021	Bank Account	IBAN; Mobile Number		0.16 (2023)
InstaPay	Philippines	2018	Bank Account e-wallet	QR Code; Account Number and Recipient's Bank Name; Mobile Number; Email ID		0.74 (2023)
PESONet	Philippines	2017	Bank Account e-wallet	Account Number and Recipient's Bank Name; Mobile Number; Email ID		0.08 (2023)
BLIK	Poland	2015	Bank Account	NFC; Dynamic Code	ATM Withdrawal & Deposit; Recurring Payments	1.80 (2023)
Faster Payment System (Russia)	Russia	2019	Bank Account	Mobile Number		668 (2024)
Fast and Secure Transfers (FAST)	Singapore	2014	Bank Account	Bank Account Number with Bank Code		0.29 (2022)
PayNow	Singapore	2017	Bank Account	QR Code; NRIC; Mobile Number	International Remittance	0.31 (2022)
Bizum	Spain; Andorra	2016	Bank Account	Mobile Number; QR Code	Direct Donations to NGOs Cross-border instant payment	1 (2022)
Swish	Sweden	2012	Bank Account	QR Code; Mobile Number		
TWINT	Switzerland	2017	Bank Account	QR Code; Mobile Number; Dynamic Token		0.59 (2023)
PromptPay	Thailand	2021	Bank Account	QR Code; Mobile Number		3.6 (2023)
Faster Payment Service (FPS)	United Kingdom	2008	Bank Account	Account Number and Recipient Name; QR Code	Forward dated payments Standing orders	4.5 (2023)
Zelle	United States	2017	Bank Account	Email; Mobile Number		2.3 (2022)
FedNow	United States	2023	Bank Account			
Visa Direct	United States	2025	Bank Account with Visa Debit Card	Debit Card number with cardholder's name	Converted to an instant payment system in April 2025, for customers in the US; Visa Direct is different from Visa's card payment service, which is not an instant payment system	10 (2024)
EasyPay	Ukraine	2009	Bank Account	Mobile Number		0.05 (2021)
Multibanco	Portugal	1985	Bank Account	Unique generated number (Referência Multibanco); Bank Account Number; IBAN; Mobile Number (2015); NFC (2017); QR Code (2018)	ATM withdrawals In-store Payments; Government/Service Payments; Virtual Credit Cards; P2P transfers Online Shopping	
SEPA Instant Credit Transfer (SCT Inst, SEPA Instant Payment)	EU	2017	Bank Account	International Bank Account Number	Extension of the regular SEPA transfer mechanism; must be offered by all banks in the SEPA area (since October 2025). Supports QR codes for initiating transfers.	2060 (2024)
PayShap	South Africa	2023	Bank Account	ShapID (cellphonenumber@bank) Bank account details	Payment requests P2P transfers	1 (2026)

== See also ==
- Clearing (finance)
- European Central Bank
- EBA Clearing
- SWIFT for NPP
- Settlement (finance)
