= Instant Payment Network =

Instant Payment Network (IPN)
- Product type: Instant inter-bank payment system
- Current owner: Central Bank of Egypt
- Country: Egypt
- Introduced: 22 March 2022; 4 years ago

Instant Payment Network (IPN) is an Egyptian real-time payment system that was officially launched in March 2022 by the Central Bank of Egypt to facilitate instant and seamless financial transactions. It enables individuals and businesses to send and receive money instantly, 24/7, across different banks and financial institutions.

It is closely linked to InstaPay, a digital payment application that acts as a gateway for users to access IPN services, enabling real-time fund transfers and improving financial inclusion in the country.
