= Unified Lending Interface =

Unified Lending Interface (ULI)
- Country: India

Unified Lending Interface, commonly referred to as ULI, is an Indian digital lending interface. ULI was introduced by Reserve Bank of India to speed up the process of giving loans. It facilitates the flow of digital information, such as land records from various states, directly to lenders. It integrates an open architecture with open Application Programming Interfaces (APIs), allowing various financial institutions to connect in a ‘plug and play’ model.

It is currently in pilot stage.

== History ==
Unified Lending Interface is aimed at reducing the time taken for appraisal, especially for small borrowers in rural areas. It is currently under pilot stage. The interface is expected to serve as the place for sourcing data to lenders from multiple sources about the potential borrowers. It is a consent based process.

== Service ==
The ULI platform consolidates data from various sources, including Aadhaar e-KYC, state government land records, PAN validation, and account aggregators for facilitating the lending process.

== See also ==
- Unified Payments Interface
- Reserve Bank of India
- Pradhan Mantri Jan Dhan Yojana
