= BHIM =

Indian mobile payments app

Bharat Interface for Money
- Developer: NPCI BHIM Services Limited
- Release: 30 December 2016; 9 years ago

Stable release(s)
- Android: 4.0.3 / 16 May 2025; 15 months ago
- iOS: 4.0.3 / 20 May 2025; 15 months ago
- Operating system: Android 5 & above; iOS 9.0 and above
- Platform: Google Play; App Store
- Size: 46 MB (Android); 79.9 MB (ios)
- Available in: 20 languages
- Type: Mobile app
- License: Open source
- Website: www.bhimupi.org.in

BHIM (Bharat Interface for Money) is an Indian state-owned mobile payment app developed by the National Payments Corporation of India (NPCI), based on the Unified Payments Interface (UPI). Launched on 30 December 2016, it is intended to facilitate e-payments directly through banks and encourage cashless transactions. The application supports all Indian banks which use UPI, which is built over the Immediate Payment Service (IMPS) infrastructure and allows the user to instantly transfer money between 170 member banks of any two parties. It can be used on all mobile devices. The app is named in honour of B. R. Ambedkar.

In 2020, data breach of the application affected more than 7 million users.

== Operation ==
BHIM allows users to send or receive money to or from UPI payment addresses, or to non-UPI based accounts (by scanning a QR code with account number and IFS code or MMID code).

Unlike mobile wallets (Paytm, MobiKwik, M-Pesa, Airtel Money, etc.) which hold money, the BHIM app is only a mechanism which transfers money between different bank accounts. Transactions on BHIM are nearly instantaneous and can be done at any time, including weekends and bank holidays.

BHIM now also allows users to send or receive digital payments through Aadhaar authentication. BHIM will be made available on Open Network for Digital Commerce (ONDC) in an effort to challenge PhonePe and Google Pay's hegemony.

=== On-device wallet ===
On September 20, RBI governor Shaktikanta Das officially launched an on-device wallet called UPI Lite at Global Fintech Fest 2022. As per NPCI, some of the early use cases involve FASTag recharges, insurance payments, and EMI collections offline. Canara Bank, HDFC Bank, Indian Bank, Kotak Mahindra Bank, Punjab National Bank, State Bank of India, Union Bank of India and Utkarsh Small Finance Bank enabled UPI Lite feature on BHIM.

== Transaction fees and limits ==
Currently, there is no charge for transactions from ₹1 to ₹100,000. Some banks might, however, levy a fee for UPI or IMPS transfers.

In 2017, Indian banks proposed transaction charges on UPI transactions, but there is no information on whether transactions through BHIM will also be charged.

== Language support ==
As of January 2023 the app supports 20 languages (including English), and is expected to support all 22 recognised languages of India.

== License ==
NPCI announced on 9 November 2022 that the BHIM app will adopt an open-source license model. All regulated financial entities can now utilize the source code and, in the future, release the same functionalities that the BHIM app offers.

== Reception ==
During the 2017 Union budget of India, Finance Minister Arun Jaitley said that the app is currently being used by over 12.5 million Indian citizens, and that the government will launch two new schemes to promote its use. One will be referral payments for individuals, and the other will be cashback for merchants who accept payments. In October 2021, the BHIM UPI platform surpassed a record of $100 billion in value (₹7.71 lakh crore) with over 4.2 billion digital transactions. Earlier in 2021, Bhutan became the first country to adopt the BHIM UPI for their digital transactions after the approval of the Royal Monetary Authority of Bhutan.

== Security ==
In May 2020, VPNMentor, a cyber security firm, disclosed that the BHIM app suffered a huge data breach leaking approximately 7.26 million Indian users' personal and financial data, such as name, contact details, Aadhaar card, PAN card, caste certificate, fingerprint scans, educational certificates and more. The 4.09 GB files were leaked from a CSC operated website because of a misconfigured AWS S3 bucket, and not the official BHIM website. CSC explicitly mentioned, however, that it is working with BHIM and NPCI in partnership. VPNMentor and other cybersecurity experts confirm the data to be authentic. Indian officials denied data leak.

== See also ==
- National Unified USSD Platform
- Unified Payments Interface
