= Givebutter =

American software company

Givebutter is an American software company founded in 2016 by Max Friedman, Liran Cohen, and Ari Krasner while they were students at George Washington University.

The company provides a customer relationship management platform for nonprofit organizations, offering tools for fundraising, payment processing, and donor tracking. The platform operates on a voluntary contribution model, allowing organizations to use the service without a mandatory fee, or to pay a flat platform fee of 3%.

== Background ==
Givebutter was founded at George Washington University by its three founders, who were initially "operating out of their dorm room".

The company was originally established under the name We Give Two, an online sweepstakes project that attracted approximately 98,000 entrants and directed a portion of its proceeds to a charitable organization.

Givebutter later transitioned into a fundraising software platform and has raised more than $50 million in venture funding. According to TechCrunch journalist Rebecca Szkutak, the company holds approximately 1% market share within the nonprofit software sector.

As of 2024, 7,085 organizations used Givebutter to receive recurring donations. The data has been cited in case studies examining increased adoption of recurring donation models among nonprofit organizations.

In 2025, Givebutter acquired We Are For Good, a professional community for social impact practitioners, which reported 700,000 podcast downloads, 25,000 newsletter subscribers, and approximately 150 meetups across the United States.

== Reception ==
In 2026, Fast Company noted Givebutter as one of "the most innovative companies working on social good".

Givebutter was cited in the book Monthly Giving Mastermind as a case study examining the growth of recurring donations in the nonprofit sector.

Built In included Givebutter in its Future 5 series, which profiles organizations identified as having growth potential.

Philanthropy Women published a review of the platform, discussing its features and its potential applications within feminist philanthropy. The review stated, “To be clear, Givebutter isn’t paying me to give them a great review…but when I investigated further, I got excited about the opportunities a platform like this presents for the world of feminist giving.”

In September 2025, American Banker reported on the integration between Cash App and Givebutter, noting that it represented Cash App’s first integration supporting philanthropic payments.

In October 2025, them magazine reported that musician Chappell Roan used Givebutter to raise funds for her Fund for Trans Youth.
