= Amazon Pay =

Online purchase processing system

- Company type: Private
- Website type: Digital payments & Financial services
- Available in: English
- Founded: 2007; 19 years ago
- Headquarters: Seattle, Washington, U.S.
- Parent: Amazon
- Website: pay.amazon.com
- Commercial: Yes
- Registration: Free
- Current status: Active

Amazon Pay is an online Payment service provider owned by Amazon. Launched in 2007, Amazon Pay uses the consumer base of Amazon.com and focuses on giving users the option to pay with their Amazon accounts on external merchant websites. Before Amazon Pay was functional in China, in 2008, Alipay entered into a cooperation with Amazon.cn to enable payments through Alipay's platform in order to support cash flow, which was a problem for Amazon since the beginning. Around 70% of Amazon.cn's businesses were paid on delivery, and a large amount of cash is usually collected by those delivery companies. The integration supported Amazon's early B2C efforts in China, and Alipay was already being used for payments on Alibaba's e-commerce sites like Taobao, making it a logical choice. Alibaba's Alipay also offered Amazon.cn customers the ability to pay for purchases online through their platform. The partnership was needed at a time when Amazon.cn had a cash flow problems and was relying mostly on cash-on-delivery shipments in China. The facilitation with Amazon provided the company to compete in a market where Alipay was dominating and being used by millions of users not only in China but also in India and Thailand, and it also showed that Amazon was willing to adopt a local payment solution that customers were comfortable with.Currently Amazon Pay is not integrated with Alipay for domestic transactions and Chinese consumers rely on Alipay and WeChat Pay rather than other foreign payment methods.Alibaba's affiliate Alipay ended their partnership with Amazon after 2008 which up until that point enabled payments on the site and helped to ease cash-flow problems for cash-on-delivery orders. As Alibaba expanded their payment ecosystem around Taobao, Tmall, and Alipay's and other domestic e-commerce, Amazon Pay focused on western markets. For example, Amazon Pay focused on enabling checkout for customers already using Amazon in Western markets. Currently there are no Amazon Pay - Alipay linkages for shoppers inside mainland China. Amazon Register and Amazon Pay were less popular among customers even in the US. As of October 2024, the service was available to businesses based in 18 countries: Austria, Belgium, Cyprus, Denmark, France, Germany, Hungary, India, Ireland, Italy, Japan, Luxembourg, Netherlands, Portugal, Spain, Sweden, Switzerland, United Kingdom, and the United States.

Amazon Pay announced a partnership with Worldpay in 2019, allowing Worldpay clients to enable Amazon Pay as a part of the same integration.

== Products ==
Amazon Pay incorporates a variety of products for buyers and merchants to process online payments.

=== Amazon Pay ===
Amazon Pay provides the option to purchase goods and services from websites and mobile apps using the addresses and payment methods stored in the Amazon account, such as credit cards or a direct debit bank account or the Unified Payments Interface (UPI) in India.

=== Amazon Pay Express ===
Amazon Pay Express is a payments processing service for simple e-commerce use cases on websites. It is built on Amazon Pay but without requiring a full e-commerce integration, it can be used to create a button that can be copied and pasted onto a website or added via a WordPress plug-in. It is best suited for merchants selling a small number of products with a single item in each order, such as a digital download.

=== Amazon Pay UPI ===
On 14 February 2019, Amazon launched Amazon Pay Unified Payments Interface (UPI) for Android users in partnership with Axis Bank. This service issues UPI IDs to its Indian customers to allow for secure payments. The mechanism of Amazon Pay UPI is the same as other UPI apps like BHIM, Paytm and PhonePe. Anyone with Amazon India app can access this service.

By mid-2024, Amazon Pay was one of the top 10 apps on UPI, accounting for 0.5% of all transactions in July 2024.

== Evolution ==
=== Checkout by Amazon (CBA) ===
Checkout by Amazon (CBA) was an e-commerce solution that allowed web merchants to accept Amazon account information and use Amazon for payment processing. CBA could manage several aspects of the transaction, including order processing, promotional discounts, shipping rates, sales tax calculation, and up-selling. Depending on the merchant's needs, CBA could be integrated into the merchant's systems with manual processing (through Seller Central) or through SOAP APIs or downloadable CSV files. CBA also claimed to reduce the bad debt because of Amazon's fraud detection capabilities. CBA was discontinued in the UK and Germany in 2016 and in the US in April 2017.

=== Amazon Flexible Payments Service (FPS) ===
Flexible Payments Service (FPS) was an Amazon Web Service that allowed money transfer between two entities using a technology built on single, multiple, and unlimited use payment tokens. Merchants managed their service use via API or solution providers. They accessed the account through a merchant account on the Amazon Payments website. The service was launched as a limited beta in August 2007 and, later in February 2009, was promoted to General Availability. FPS differed from CBA because FPS did not handle additional capabilities associated with order processing, such as promotions, tax, and shipping. FPS also provided the payments processing for the Amazon Web Services DevPay service but it was discontinued in June 2015.

=== GoPago technology acquisition ===
In 2013 Amazon acquired GoPago's technology (mPayment) and hired their engineering and product teams. Amazon was interested in the mobile payment business. GoPago's app allows shoppers to order and pay for goods and services before arriving at a company.

=== Pay with Alexa ===
In 2020, Amazon enabled Alexa users to pay for gas by talking to Alexa.

Biometric Authentication for UPI

From Dec, 2025 Android users can now approve transactions up to INR 5,000 using fingerprint or facial recognition thanks to Amazon Pay's introduction of biometric identification for UPI payments in India. The goal of the change is to improve the security, speed, and ease of UPI payments.

== Security ==
On September 22, 2010, Amazon published a security advisory regarding a security flaw in its Amazon Payments SDKs. This flaw allows a shopper to shop for free in web stores using those SDKs. Amazon mandated all web stores to upgrade to its new SDKs before November 1, 2010. Amazon acknowledged security researcher Rui Wang for finding this bug. The detail of the flaw is documented in the paper "How to Shop for Free Online - Security Analysis of Cashier-as-a-Service Based Web Stores" by Rui Wang, Shuo Chen, XiaoFeng Wang, and Shaz Qadeer.

== See also ==
- Digital wallet
- PayPal
- List of online payment service providers
