= National Unified USSD Platform =

Payment service platform in India

The National Unified USSD Platform (NUUP), also known as the *99# service, is a platform that provides access to the Unified Payment Interface (UPI) service over the USSD protocol. Initiated by the Government of India and developed by the National Payments Corporation of India (NPCI), it facilitates access to banking services from mobile phones.

The USSD code to access the NUUP is *99#. The Telecom Regulatory Authority of India (TRAI) has set a maximum ceiling of ₹1.5 per transaction for accessing the NUUP, although rates can differ among service providers.
