= Immediate Payment Service =

Electronic funds transfer system in India

- Operating area: India
- Founded: 22 November 2010; 14 years ago
- Owner: National Payments Corporation of India
- Website: www.npci.org.in/what-we-do/imps/product-overview

Immediate Payment Service (IMPS) is an instant payment inter-bank electronic funds transfer system in India. National Electronic Funds Transfer (NEFT) was also made available 24/7 from December 2019. Real-time gross settlement (RTGS) was also made available 24/7 from 14 December 2020.

Unified Payments Interface is built on top of IMPS, with the key architectural work done by the Mobile Payments Forum of India, IIT Madras and Institute for Development and Research in Banking Technology (IDRBT).

== History ==
Immediate Payment Service is managed by the National Payments Corporation of India (NPCI) and is built upon the existing National Financial Switch network. In 2010, the NPCI initially carried out a pilot for the mobile payment system with 4 member banks (State Bank of India, Bank of India, Union Bank of India and ICICI Bank), and expanded it to include Yes Bank, Axis Bank and HDFC Bank later that year. IMPS was publicly launched on 22 November 2010. As of April 2023, there are 722 member banks which signed up for the IMPS service.

Around 200 million IMPS transactions amounting to roughly US$20 billion of transaction amount happen every month in India.

IPMS Statistics
| Year | Member banks | INR value (in mn) | USD value (in bn) |
|---|---|---|---|
| 2024* | 919 | 7070902.52 | 818.87 |
| 2023 | 827 | 61908887.5 | 744.01 |
| 2022 | 684 | 49346951.5 | 608.02 |
| 2021 | 663 | 29324894.9 | 384.28 |
| 2020 | 620 | 26838329.3 | 363.76 |
| 2019 | 559 | 21819802.3 | 307.98 |
| 2018 | 394 | 13926164.8 | 188.21 |
| 2017 | 303 | 7660254.3 | 117.96 |
| 2016 | 190 | 3114447.1 | 46.11 |
| 2015 | 124 | 1328077.9 | 19.89 |
| 2014 | 73 | 390365.9 | 6.41 |
| 2013 | 59 | 33363.4 | 0.54 |

== Interoperability ==
On March 4, 2024, the Reserve Bank of India (RBI) declared its intention to introduce an interoperable payment system for online banking transactions. The implementation of such an interoperable system has been approved for NPCI Bharat BillPay Limited (NBBL), and it would be introduced in 2024, according to RBI Governor Shaktikanta Das. It was included in the Payments Vision 2025 document, which was published in June 2022 by the Reserve Bank of India's Department of Payment and Settlement Systems.

After RBI approved the project in March 2024, NBBL, banks, and fintech companies are negotiating to adopt internet banking or net-banking interoperability. The three biggest players in the net-banking industry, HDFC Bank, State Bank of India, and ICICI Bank, are now negotiating to join the initiative. It will allow for data visibility, appropriate consumer grievance procedures, standardization of merchant settlement cycles, and will expand the payment market potential due to increased merchant integration and competition from payment aggregators. The primary use cases of net-banking include payments to vendors, insurance premiums, mutual funds, and income taxes. Currently, each bank must collaborate with a different payment aggregator in order to allow consumers to conduct net-banking transactions. Interoperability makes it possible for any aggregator to let a bank's customers pay online via net-banking.

In order for net-banking and mobile banking payments to be interoperable, NPCI has started the integration process for five to six banks. In the last quarter of 2024 or the first quarter of 2025, the system will be put online. The integration between HDFC Bank and ICICI Bank is already well progressed. Customers can opt to use net-banking to pay online when they check out of e-commerce sites because banks won't need to partner with payment aggregators to onboard merchants for net-banking payments because all banks would be accepted by merchant sites. The interoperability process is being spearheaded by Bharat Connect.

== See also ==
- Payment and settlement systems in India
- National Electronic Fund Transfer
- Real Time Gross Settlement
- Unified Payments Interface
