= Unified Payments Interface =

Indian instant payment system

- Product type: instant payment system
- Current owner: National Payments Corporation of India
- Country: India
- Introduced: 11 April 2016; 10 years ago by Raghuram Rajan
- Markets: See Acceptance
- Website: upichalega.com

Unified Payments Interface (UPI) is an Indian instant payment system and protocol developed by the National Payments Corporation of India (NPCI) in April 11th 2016. The interface facilitates inter-bank peer-to-peer (P2P) and person-to-merchant (P2M) transactions. It is used on mobile devices to instantly transfer funds between two bank accounts using only a unique UPI ID. It runs as an open source application programming interface (API) on top of the Immediate Payment Service (IMPS), and is regulated by the Reserve Bank of India (RBI). Major Indian banks started making their UPI-enabled apps available to customers in August 2016, and the system is today supported by almost all Indian banks.

As of 2025, 50% of the world's digital transactions are conducted by India's UPI platform with over 250 billion annual transactions worth US$3.4 trillion. In 2021, UPI in India had over 100 million active users. In the month of August 2025, 20 billion UPI transactions worth ₹ 25 trillion (about US$293 billion) were processed by the UPI system, processing an average of nearly 7,500 transactions every second. UPI is the largest real-time payment system in the world. it handles more than 640 million transactions every day, compared to Visa's 639 million. Furthermore, the successful execution of an instant payment system at such an enormous scale has made it a soft power tool for India and is often cited as the most transformative and successful financial technology innovation India has developed. As of 2025, UPI accounts for 84% of digital payments in India.

On 25th August 2026, UPI completed 10 years of functioning and was responsible for transactions worth ₹ 314 Trillion in FY 2025-26 representing an increase of more than 4000-fold since the year of its inception. In terms of number of transactions, there has been almost a 13000 fold increase in transactions with 241.62 billion transactions concluded in FY 2025–26.

== History ==
In April 2009, the National Payment Corporation of India (NPCI) was formed to integrate all the payment mechanisms in India and make them uniform for all retail payments. In March 2009, the Reserve Bank of India (RBI) reported an annual average of just six non-cash transactions per capita, despite over 10 million retailers accepting card-based payments. A parallel challenge was combating black money and corruption, which were primarily facilitated by cash transactions.

RBI released a vision statement in 2012 for a period of four years that indicated commitment towards building a safe, efficient, accessible, inclusive, interoperable, and authorized payment and settlement system in India. It was also part of the Green Initiative to decrease the usage of paper in the domestic payments market. UPI was officially launched in 2016 for public use. The pilot launch took place on 11 April 2016, inaugurated by Dr. Raghuram G. Rajan, Governor of the Reserve Bank of India, in Mumbai, with 21 member banks participating.

Under RBI guidance, NPCI became the primary body tasked with developing a new payment system which was simple, secure, and interoperable. UPI works on a four-pillar push-pull interoperable model where there will be a remitter/beneficiary front-end PSP (payment service provider) and a remitter/beneficiary back-end bank that settles the monetary transaction for the users. According to the CEO of Netmagic Solutions, UPI became one of the most successful deep-tech financial innovations India has produced.

In December 2019, noting the success of UPI, Google suggested that the US Federal Reserve Board should follow UPI as an example in developing FedNow, a real-time payment system for the United States.

With the exponential growth of UPI, India became the world's largest real-time payment market with 25.5 billion annual transactions in 2020 as per data from ACI Worldwide and GlobalData. This put the country ahead of China, South Korea, Thailand and the United Kingdom.

As per the Economist Intelligence Unit Report 2021, UPI has made India a leader in the global real-time payment market followed by China and South Korea. After the decision of the Ministry of Finance to nullify the merchant discount rate (MDR) in 2019 from UPI, the number of low value transactions skyrocketed, making huge gains on real-time transaction volume data. Countries such as Brazil, Bahrain, Saudi Arabia, Singapore, the United States, and the European Union are exploring options to implement a UPI-like system in their own domestic markets.

From 1 January 2019, UPI became a popular payment option for initial public offerings (IPOs). The transaction limit was enhanced from ₹100,000 to ₹200,000 in March 2020. From December 2021, RBI again increased the limit to ₹500,000 for Retail Direct Scheme and IPO applications. To make UPI economically feasible for payment companies, RBI is considering a merchant discount rate (MDR) on future UPI transactions. In its first monetary policy for the 2022–23 financial year, RBI proposed a cardless cash withdrawal facility from ATMs using UPI-based QR codes. In partnership with the NSDL Payments Bank and NPCI, ToneTag launched VoiceSE, which will enable 40 crores (400 million) feature phone users to make UPI payments using voice in Hindi, Telugu, Tamil, Malayalam, Kannada, and Bengali languages.

According to Redseer Strategy Consultants, in 2023, UPI usage has expanded outside of metro areas. Currently, around 70% of UPI users are from places other than Tier-1 cities with over 80% of newly registered users originating from Tier-2 cities. On 8 August 2024, RBI suggested raising the UPI tax payment ceiling from ₹1 lakh to ₹5 lakh.

Professor Carlos Montes, Lead of the Innovation Hub for Prosperity at the Cambridge Judge Business School, argues that UPI gives other nations a chance to absorb knowledge from India's experience and get inspiration for implementing it in their own nations. The expansion of UPI demonstrates that the government is ensuring that the technology it creates for citizens is easy to use, easily accessible, and constantly improved, which accounts for the high rate of UPI acceptance in India. In 2025, UPI surpassed Visa in digital payments, according to the International Monetary Fund. Over 640 million transactions are handled via UPI per day, compared to 639 million by Visa.

=== UPI 2.0 ===
On 16 August 2018, UPI 2.0 was launched, which enabled users to link their overdraft accounts to a UPI handle. Users were also able to pre-authorise transactions by issuing a mandate for a specific merchant. This version also included a feature to view and store an invoice for each transaction. An AutoPay facility for recurring payments was also added. As of August 2021, State Bank of India, Bank of Baroda and Paytm Payments Bank have been live on UPI AutoPay, each registering 660,000, 204,000, and 186,000 mandates, respectively. From 15 March 2022, the government removed the need for debit cards for UPI registration. NPCI is planning to expand AutoPay to international markets and operationalize real-time payment dispute resolution mechanisms covering 90% of the complaints by September 2022.

From 8 June 2022, RBI allowed linking RuPay credit cards with UPI. Customers can now make credit card payments using UPI, in the absence of a physical card. NPCI developed a real-time feature that will reduce the 24-hour time period taken by banks to unblock funds over time-out or transaction declines to 30 seconds. The service was officially launched on 20 September 2022. On 7 December 2022, RBI announced that UPI will upgrade from single-block-single to single-block-multiple debit for recurring transactions and investments in securities. This feature is expected to help users block funds for specific purposes and release them when needed.

RBI on 6 April 2023 proposed allowing credit on UPI through pre-approved bank lines which would help customers reduce their dependence on credit cards. On its point-of-sale devices, Razorpay introduced a quick refund feature for UPI in 2024. Compared to the industry average of five to six business days, the reimbursement will be initiated within 2 minutes.

After introducing the first card-less UPI automated teller machine (ATM), Hitachi Payment Services is now working on creating a UPI-based cash recycler machine (CRM). It will operate on the opposite principle to UPI ATMs'. The RBI and the NPCI are collaborating with the company to explore the feasibility of permitting deposits based on UPI. On August 29, 2024, during the Global Fintech Fest, RBI Deputy Governor T Rabi Sankar introduced the UPI Interoperable Cash Deposit (UPI-ICD) feature for cash recycler machine.

In October 2024, the transactions using RuPay credit cards via UPI apps have doubled in the first seven months of FY25. It reached ₹63,825.80 crore—up from ₹33,439.24 crore in during the same period last fiscal.

International mobile numbers of ICICI Bank's non-resident Indian clients can be used to make UPI payments in India. In ten nations—the United States, United Kingdom, United Arab Emirates, Canada, Singapore, Australia, Hong Kong, Oman, Qatar, and Saudi Arabia—the bank provides this service.

==== UPI 123PAY ====
As part of a financial inclusion initiative, NPCI, with fintech start-up Naffa Innovations and their product ToneTag, started working on developing a voice-based payment service for feature phone users in low connectivity zones over UPI payment ecosystem under Interactive Voice Response (IVR) project in 2021. The system utilised Dual Tone Multi-Frequency (DTMF) signalling technology with two-factor authentication (2FA) flow for peer-to-peer (P2P) transaction. From September 2020 to June 2021, it was under beta testing while awaiting RBI approval for large-scale deployment. The beta testing and pilot experiment were completed by October 2021 and RBI started formulating guidelines for nationwide use.

RBI governor Shaktikanta Das launched the service UPI 123PAY on 8 March 2022, with an aim to help almost 40 crores (400 million) feature phone users in the country. Until then, UPI payments were only possible through payment applications on smartphones and USSD-based service for feature phones. However, as per Deputy Governor T Rabi Shankar, the latter has been found to be cumbersome due to the unavailability of the services on several mobile networks.

UPI 123PAY has four options for payment.

1. App-based functionality where a mobile phone manufacturer can install a UPI app through over-the-air programming, that can be used for payment.
2. Missed calls based: where a customer can use a dedicated merchant payment number by giving a missed call. The incoming authentication call will ask for PIN verification to complete the transaction.
3. Interactive Voice Response (IVR) based where the payment transaction will be completed using pre-defined phone numbers.
4. Payment in offline mode through sound-based proximity data communication.

As per NPCI, some of the early use cases involve FASTag recharges, insurance payments, and EMI collections. As of 20 September 2022, Ultracash Technologies, in collaboration with Bharat Petroleum, helped 200,000 active users make LPG booking and payment through UPI 123PAY. As of October 9, 2024, the RBI increased the transaction limit from ₹5,000 to ₹10,000. Banks and service providers have until January 1, 2025, to make the required adjustments.

=== UPI 3.0 ===
NPCI started introducing new features under UPI 3.0 from 2024.

==== Conversational Voice Payments ====
At the Global Fintech Fest 2024, the National Payments Corporation of India (NPCI), Indian Railway Catering and Tourism Corporation (IRCTC), and CoRover introduced a feature described as "Conversational Voice Payments" for Unified Payments Interface (UPI).

The feature enables users to initiate transactions using voice commands or by entering a UPI ID or mobile number. When a mobile number is provided, the system retrieves the associated UPI ID and generates a payment request through the user's default UPI application. The service is integrated with CoRover's BharatGPT and supports multiple Indian languages.

The feature has also been incorporated into AskDISHA, a virtual assistant used by Indian Railways and IRCTC, allowing users to book tickets and complete payments through voice interaction.

==== Credit lines ====
The RuPay credit card on UPI facility is responsible for credit transactions of ₹10,000 crore per month. Approximately 100 to 200 crores of the ₹10,000 crore in credit card spending through UPI have been made through credit lines, according to NPCI MD and CEO Dilip Asbe. The pre-approved, small-ticket, short-term loans on UPI are called credit lines. On July 19, 2024, The New Indian Express published an article stating that Punjab National Bank, Axis Bank, State Bank of India, and ICICI Bank had already started using the UPI credit line product on a trial basis. When it comes to granting pre-approved loans through credit lines on UPI, ICICI Bank is the industry leader.

On August 23, 2024, PhonePe introduced the "Credit Line on UPI" service. It makes low-cost, high-volume retail loans available.

==== UPI Vouchers ====
Google Pay revealed at the Global Fintech Fest 2024 that it will be launching UPI Vouchers, a capability that was first made available for COVID-19 vaccine payments. This feature will be released in the second half of 2024. With UPI Vouchers, users can transfer prepaid vouchers that are connected to the smartphone number of the recipient. The recipient of these vouchers does not need to connect their bank account to UPI in order to use them for payments. It is now possible for businesses and individuals to issue and use UPI vouchers more easily thanks to the adaptation of this feature for a wider range of industries. In addition to making financial transactions for users easier, UPI Vouchers offer a smooth digital payment option for a variety of scenarios, including corporate gifts, government programs, and others.

==== UPI Circle ====
In its monetary policy announcement in August 2024, the RBI implemented the delegated payments feature through UPI. By doing this, a person (the primary user) could grant permission to another person (the secondary user) to utilize their bank account to perform UPI transactions. The primary user would choose the transaction limit.

The UPI Circle feature was launched on 19 August 2024. Two kinds of delegation are possible with UPI Circle. Full delegation, in which the primary user gives the secondary user the authority to start and finish transactions up to specified expenditure limitations without needing additional permission. Additionally, there is partial delegation, in which the primary user must authenticate and complete the payment using their UPI PIN before the secondary user may start a transaction. With UPI Circle, one can use platforms for collaboration or gig economies to create micro-communities where people can pool resources or settle payments in real time. On August 22, 2024, PhonePe released the feature on its platform. At the Global Fintech Fest 2024, Google Pay announced that it will be introducing the UPI Circle feature. The second half of 2024 will see the release of this feature.

NPCI guidelines for UPI ecosystem members,

- For Primary and Secondary users, separate user journeys are provided by payment service providers and UPI apps. Users are allowed to select the UPI app of their choosing. App passcodes and biometrics (facial or fingerprint) must be required for all secondary users.
- The primary user must first select a contact number from the contact list and then scan the QR code or input their UPI ID in order to link. Eventually, primary users will be able to connect with secondary users by choosing a contact number from the contact list alone, rather than scanning a QR code.
- Up to five secondary users may be delegated by a primary user, and only one primary user may accept delegation from a secondary user. Members must make sure that, in cases of full or partial delegation, the primary user grants permission to the secondary user.
- Members are responsible for making sure the principal user has restricted access to set use limits for their secondary users. Members must guarantee a maximum monthly limit of approximately 15,000 per delegate and a maximum per transaction limit of approximately 5,000 for full delegation.
- The current UPI restrictions will apply in the event of partial delegation. Members are responsible for making sure that, following the successful connection of primary and secondary users for both full and partial delegation, a daily transaction limit of about 5,000 is set for the first 24 hours of the cooling period.
- Members are required to make certain that transactions made by secondary users are visible to the primary user on their bank account statement and UPI app.
- Members must abide by RBI regulations regarding "Harmonization of Turn Around Time" and compensating customers for unsuccessful transactions through authorized payment methods. UPI transactions must provide online dispute resolution capabilities.

===== Agentic Payment =====
In order to provide Agentic Payments on ChatGPT and investigate AI-driven commerce on a national level, Razorpay, NPCI, and OpenAI are conducting a pilot project as of October 2025. It will make digital payments intelligent, conversational, and easy. Before completing a transaction, customers will set aside money for particular merchants in order to secure their payment passwords. It guarantees that payments only proceed after a user confirms. With options for instantaneous payment cancelation and real-time tracking, users maintain control.

The effort, which is based on UPI Circle and UPI Reserve Pay, aims to provide smooth UPI transactions for AI-native shopping. Razorpay, NPCI, and OpenAI will investigate AI-based payment use cases as part of this project, including safe and customized AI commerce through conversational checkout and shopping experiences. Axis Bank and Airtel Payments Bank are banking partners. Bigbasket is the first retailer to be able to test this service.

=== Technical controls and operational limits (2025) ===
On 1 August 2025, the NPCI implemented new technical and operational restrictions across UPI applications to enhance system stability and reduce the risk of fraud. The changes include daily limits on balance enquiry and “list accounts” API calls, a regulated processing window for autopay mandate scheduling, and caps.

== Transaction Fees ==
From 2019 onwards UPI Transactions were exempt from charges. However, the Lok Sabha passed a bill in August 2026 that amends the Payment and Settlements Systems Act, 2007 to authorise the government to permit the levy of charges on UPI. The charges may be levied by banks and service providers. The charge known as Merchant discount rate is expected to be in the range of 0.3%-0.5% of the transaction & is also expected to be levied on transactions above a threshold. It is also expected that the levy will only be on payments made to businesses

The levy of the fee is expected to help the banks and other institutions recover their costs in maintaining the infrastructure needed to enable the entire payment ecosystem.

On 14 September 2026, the Indian government notified provisions prohibiting banks and payment-system providers from imposing direct or indirect charges on UPI transactions of up to ₹2,000 and payments using RuPay debit cards. Whether charges would apply to higher-value UPI transactions, and how they would be levied, remained undecided. From 15 October 2026, a standard merchant discount rate (MDR) of 0.4% will apply to person-to-merchant UPI transactions above ₹2,000, capped at ₹300 per transaction. Railway, fuel, insurance, telecom and government utility payments above ₹2,000 will instead attract a flat ₹5 MDR. Capital-market payments will attract a separate rate of 0.02%, capped at ₹300. Eligible small merchants under the person-to-person-merchant (P2PM) framework will remain exempt, including when an individual payment exceeds ₹2,000. Consumers and peer-to-peer transfers will remain free of charges, and merchants will not be permitted to pass MDR charges on to customers.

== Service ==
For real-time payments from one bank account to another, any UPI client app can be used and multiple bank accounts can be linked to a single app. Money can be sent or requested using a user-created Virtual Payment Address (VPA) or UPI ID for each bank account using the KYC-linked mobile number. UPI also generates a specific QR code for each user account for contactless payments. The RBI increased the UPI payment limit for payments in hospitals and educational institutions from ₹100,000 to ₹500,000 on 8 December 2023. Multi-factor authentication for UPI e-mandates will now be activated over ₹100,000, as opposed to ₹15,000, for credit card repayments, mutual fund subscriptions, and insurance premium payments.

=== Mobile apps ===
Any UPI app can be used to transfer funds from and to UPI enabled banks. Apart from various third-party apps such as Google Pay (previously Tez), PhonePe, Paytm, Samsung wallet (Samsung pay), Amazon Pay, Airtel Payments Bank, MobiKwik, WhatsApp Pay, Hero Digital Lending & UPI App, NPCI manages its own app, BHIM.

The total number of banks linked to UPI platform grew from 21 in April 2016 to 304 in February 2022.

In June 2021, NPCI removed the restriction placed on WhatsApp for UPI customer onboarding which until then was limited to 2 crore (20 million) users. With 53 crores (530 million) registered users in the Indian market, WhatsApp could then roll out UPI to all its customers. In place of the present four- or six-digit UPI PIN, NPCI proposed forming collaborations with startups to implement biometric identification for UPI transactions utilizing fingerprints on Android smartphones and face ID on iPhones.

==== Foreign tourists ====
There are multiple apps that allow foreign tourists to make UPI payment such as UPI One World, Mony among others.

==== On-Device wallet ====
NPCI called this feature UPI Lite. It can scan a QR code without the need of an internet connection. In phase 1, UPI Lite will process the debit transaction offline while the credit will happen when the device goes online. But the final goal is to achieve both credit and debit transaction through offline mode. The upper limit of UPI Lite On-Device wallet is ₹2,000. Additional factor authentication or UPI AutoPay feature will be used to securely load the desirable amount. Since 50% of UPI transactions are below ₹200 with a higher frequency rate, the per transaction limit will be maximum ₹200, as it creates a large backlog of volume which increases the failure rate and affects the stability of the entire payment network. To save electricity consumption and computing power of banks, UPI mobile apps will have to support on-device wallet features as per the RBI directive from December 2021. The in-built wallet will help in low-value instant payment by using the infrastructure of the mobile app developer, thus decreasing the load on banks through decentralization of back-end infrastructure and resources.

On 20 September, RBI governor Shaktikanta Das officially launched UPI Lite at Global Fintech Fest 2022. Canara Bank, HDFC Bank, Indian Bank, Kotak Mahindra Bank, Punjab National Bank, State Bank of India, Union Bank of India and Utkarsh Small Finance Bank enabled UPI Lite feature on BHIM. Paytm Payments Bank on 15 February 2023 went live with UPI Lite feature.

Beginning November 1, 2024, the UPI Lite auto top-up feature will allow the balance to be automatically replenished when it drops below a certain threshold. The user is responsible for setting the minimum balance and reload amount, which cannot be greater than the ₹2,000 wallet limit. The UPI Lite account can be topped-up up to five times in a single day. Users using UPI Lite are currently able to transact up to ₹500 each. Furthermore, ₹2,000 is the maximum amount that can be stored in a UPI Lite wallet. For users of UPI Lite wallets, the cumulative maximum daily expenditure limit has been set at ₹4,000. It has been suggested by the RBI that the UPI Lite maximum transaction limit be raised from ₹500 to ₹1,000. The UPI Lite wallet limit has also been raised from ₹2,000 to ₹5,000.

=== Supported banks ===
The NPCI website lists the banks that facilitate UPI, termed as Payment Service Providers (PSP) – listed with their UPI application and handle – and issuers. PSP includes banks which have their own mobile application to facilitate transaction and issuers include banks which do not have their own payments interface and rely on third-party software for transactions. On 1 August 2024, RBL Bank announced integration of UPI and National Common Mobility Card capabilities with RuPay credit cards.

=== e-RUPI ===
e-RUPI

e-RUPI or e₹UPI (portmanteau of electronic Rupee and UPI) developed in collaboration with Department of Financial Services, Ministry of Health and Family Welfare and National Health Authority. It was introduced from 2 August 2021. e-RUPI is to ensure leak proof delivery of welfare services and bypassing middle man to decrease corruption. Private sector can use the service for their own corporate social responsibility initiative (CSR). e-RUPI is basically e-voucher based on QR code or SMS string that can be delivered through mobile phone. e-RUPI will act as a precursor for future Central bank digital currency (CBDC) that will be launched by RBI as it will help in highlighting the gaps within the national digital payment infrastructure.

Financial Software and Systems (FSS) integrated e-RUPI on 1 December 2021 for financially underserved segments of the society. Government of Karnataka partnered with NPCI to provide student scholarship through e-RUPI which can even be received on feature phones.

=== Digital Rupee ===
As part of the Central Bank Digital Currency pilot project, Canara Bank has released the Unified Payments Interface compatible digital rupee mobile app. Without the need for a separate on-boarding procedure for CBDC for retailers, it will enable users to scan the existing UPI QR code and make payments using digital rupee. Customers in 26 Indian cities who have been whitelisted can access the service as part of a pilot program.

== Market share ==
From 93,000 transactions in August 2016 valued at ₹ 3 crore (30 million), UPI generated 80 crore (800 million) transactions in March 2019 with a total value of ₹ 1.3 lakh crore (1330 billion). In June 2021, UPI recorded 9.4 crore (94 million) IPO mandates that increased to 76.6 lakhs (7.66 million) in July. This was the highest ever since UPI was made mandatory by Securities and Exchange Board of India for domestic retail investors for IPO process. By late August 2020, with 18 billion annual transactions, UPI surpassed American Express in India. NITI Aayog predicted that UPI will also surpass Visa and Mastercard by 2023. UPI took three years to reach 1.14 billion in October 2019 while by the end of October 2020, the payment system registered 2.07 billion transactions. In 2020, $457 billion worth of value was moved on UPI platform which was 15% of India's GDP.

As of July 2021, UPI registered 432.5 million transactions that accounted for ₹567,345 million with highest average daily transaction of approximately 100 million that is double the amount from July 2020. As of August 2021, UPI forms 10% of all retail payment in India. PhonePe and Google Pay both recorded 1 billion transactions in August with a market share of 45.94% and 34.45% respectively in the UPI payment ecosystem while Paytm took 11.94% share with ₹387.85 million transaction.

From the financial year 2015–21, the domestic retail payment by value on UPI grew at 18% at a compound annual growth rate (CAGR) while between 2017 and 2021, the collective payment on all forms of UPI grew at 400% CAGR. In the financial year 2021, ₹41 trillion (short scale) worth of money was exchanged on the UPI platform that is 2.8 times the value of debit and credit card payment at point of sale (POS) terminals and 20 times the value of digital wallet and prepaid instruments in India.

UPI registered 3.55 billion transactions in August 2021, a growth of 9.56% from the previous month. In terms of value, ₹6.39 trillion worth of money was transacted in August alone. From ₹3.2 trillion to ₹6 trillion, the growth in value terms doubled between September 2020 to July 2021. It had reached an all-time high of 3.65 billion transactions worth ₹6.54 trillion in value since inception in the month of September. By now the total transaction for the year 2021, reached ₹50 trillion.

UPI touched value of ₹7.71 trillion in October 2021 which is a 56% jump from September. As per NPCI, daily UPI payment for the month of October is between ₹250 billion to ₹300 billion. Out of all UPI transactions done in the month of October, 54% are Person-to-Person (P2P) while 46% were Person-to-Merchant (P2M). UPI reached $844 billion in value until November 2021. In December, the total transaction value on UPI reached ₹8.27 trillion with 99% annual growth rate. The largest share in $2 trillion of annual digital payment in India comes from UPI. The Q2 of 2022 saw 20.57 billion transactions worth ₹36.08 trillion as per Worldline SA.P2P accounted for 49% in volume and 67% in value while P2M accounted for 34% in volume and 17% in value. As per CEO Dilip Asbe of NPCI, P2M as of November 2022 accounts for more than 50% of UPI transaction volumes. In 2019, UPI accounted for 17% of the ₹31 billion of digital transactions, and in 2022, accounted for 52% of the ₹88.4 billion of digital transactions.

As per Minister of State for Finance Bhagwat Karad, in terms of volume, UPI increased at a CAGR of 147% from 92 crore in FY 2017–18 to 8,375 crore in FY 2022–2023. At a CAGR of 168%, the value of UPI transactions increased from ₹1 lakh crore in FY 2017–18 to ₹139 lakh crore in FY 2022–23. With UPI representing 62% of digital payment transactions in FY 2022–2023, it has been the primary driver of the overall development of digital payment transactions in India.

In January 2024, the value of UPI transactions reached ₹18.41 trillion, a slight increase of 1% from ₹18.23 trillion in December 2023. From 12.02 billion in October 2023 to 12.20 billion in January 2024, there was a 1.5% increase in transactions. With 11.4 billion transactions, the value was recorded at ₹17.4 trillion in November 2023. In comparison to the same month in the previous fiscal year, January 2024 numbers were 52% higher in volume and 42% higher in value, according to NPCI data. According to RBI governor Shaktikanta Das, in 2023 UPI would account for close to 80% of digital payments. Nearly 8 out of 10 digital payments are now done through UPI.

Year	No. of Payment Partners on UPI	Transaction volume (in mn)	INR value (in mn)	USD value (in bn)
2026	684			
2025	684	208,813.90	298,624,713.0	3,436,96
2024	641	139,995.98	246,825,208.1	2,850.93
2023	522	117,675.97	182,844,068.2	2,195.03
2022	382	74,044.48	125,948,187.3	1,303.99
2021	282	38,744.55	71,592,858.0	741.23
2020	207	18,880.89	33,877,447.2	350.75
2019	144	10,787.54	18,366,381.8	190.15
2018	129	3,746.32	5,857,104.5	60.64
2017	67	418.8	570,208.7	5.9
2016	35	2.65	8,930.7	0.09

source – NPCI portal

~this data excludes the transactions having debit/credit to the same account for the month of August 2018 onwards

=== Market cap ===
On 26 March 2021, NPCI defined standard operating procedure for third-party payment providers on 30% market cap. The limit will be calculated on the basis of total volume of transactions processed over UPI during the preceding three months on a rolling basis starting from 1 January 2021. Compliance deadline is until December 2023. NPCI will push first alert through an email or a letter to third-party payment providers and their partner banks when UPI transactions hits 25–27% threshold which payment providers must acknowledge. In return, payment providers will send second alert to NPCI with evidence on the steps taken for compliance. In case 30% mark is breached, payment providers and banks must stop new user on-boarding. In special cases, payment providers and banks may get an exemption of 6 months for compliance. The report of breaching 30% market cap must reach NPCI within first five working days with plan for corrective measures. During the same period, payment providers and banks must inform new customers about the issue. Non compliance of market cap bring penalties under UPI procedural guidelines. NPCI will check operating procedures of UPI every 6 months to meet objectives without creating inconvenience for end users.

PhonePe made a formal request to NPCI to defer the 30% market cap deadline from January 2023 to January 2026. NPCI is currently discussing this issue with RBI and Government. Industry stakeholders want to do away with 30% market cap proposed by NPCI, instead want organic growth based on customer demand. Implementation is a contentious issue as it results in blocking existing users from performing payment to maintain the 30% market cap. RBI has also started looking for solutions to fix the duopoly situation created by Google Pay and PhonePe. Both players will get two additional years till 31 December 2024 to fix their market cap.

== Internationalization ==
Around 777 million Indian consumers shopped across the border in 2021. To make ease of payment, NPCI International Payments Limited (NIPL) signed memorandum of understanding (MoU) with UK-based PPRO Financial on 17 November 2021 to expand the acceptance of UPI into foreign markets, especially those in China and the United States which account for half of all international transaction coming from India. On 26 January 2022, UK based fintech startup Transact365 enabled UPI for global merchants with real time currency conversion facility that will help them do business in India independent of local presence. As per NPCI and RBI mandate, banks, payment service providers (PSPs) and third-party application providers (TPAPs) in India must enable international acceptance through UPI from 30 September 2022.

With the release of the Payments Vision 2025 document on 17 June 2022, RBI will push for internationalization of UPI with nations using United States dollar, Pound sterling and Euro under bilateral treaties. Ministry of External Affairs (MEA) also actively pushing for internationalization of UPI due to geopolitical concerns. But several countries including Canada are reluctant to accept UPI due to pushback from American firms. MEA is looking for Central Bank to Central Bank transfer using UPI as the pipeline and a collaborative effort if the countries have a similar system like UPI. On 12 October 2022, India offered UPI and related technologies to Commonwealth of Nations.

On 7 February 2023, PhonePe announced extending support of UPI for international payments in UAE, Singapore, Mauritius, Nepal, and Bhutan. Users will be able to pay in international currency directly from Indian bank accounts. NIPL signed a definitive agreement with PPRO Financial on 27 April 2023 that will enable acceptance of UPI among international payment service providers (PSPs) and global merchant acquirers.

On 18 July 2023, Universal Postal Union Director General Masahiko Metoki met with Union Minister Ashwini Vaishnaw from the Ministry of Communications. He consented to assess the integration of UPI for international money transfers via postal routes. NPCI and RBI started active discussions with SWIFT for allowing international dollar transactions on UPI. Google and NPCI signed MoU for UPI expansion abroad with the aim to make sure that Indian tourists visiting other countries have a smooth international transaction experience. It also seeks to use the UPI infrastructure to streamline international remittances. The MoU also stated the intention of Google to develop UPI like system for foreign countries.

Indian customers will be able to send money abroad using UPI thanks to WhatsApp's upcoming introduction of international payment capabilities. It is anticipated that the functionality will go live for beta testers prior to an official release. With an initial schedule of 2024–25 and a completion timeline of 2028–29, RBI and NIPL will endeavor to expand UPI to 20 nations in accordance with the objectives of Viksit Bharat 2047.

PayPal announced PayPal World on 23 July 2025 to facilitate interoperability between different payment platforms for international trade. UPI, Weixin Pay, Venmo, Mercado Pago are among the launch partners.

=== UPI One World ===
RBI announced extending UPI payment facility for inbound travelers from G20 countries. Transcorp International Limited will enable UPI One World for nationals coming from G20 countries.

The launch of the UPI One World wallet for all international visitors to India was announced by NPCI on 22 July 2024. After a thorough KYC check based on a passport and valid visa, the service is available through approved PPI issuers at airports, hotels, specified money exchange sites, and other touchpoints. As per foreign exchange restrictions, any unused balance can be returned to the original payment source. NPCI, IDFC First Bank, and Transcorp International Limited have collaborated to make it possible, under the direction of the Reserve Bank of India.

=== UPI Wallet ===
UPI Wallet facility has been introduced for foreign tourists in India, Once set up, users can add funds using their preferred debit or credit card and start scanning to pay at over 20 million stores in India with no commission fee. The wallet's wide acceptance means it is convenient for tourists to transact in any location, from roadside tea stalls to five-star resorts. There are apps for UPI wallet such as Cheq UPI.

=== Remittance ===
In 2020, Xoom and UPI were integrated to enable Indian diaspora in the US, Canada, and Europe to send money to their relatives and friends in India. Users of Xoom have access to 66 Indian banks for money transfers.

Due to increasing remittances to India, NIPL with Western Union is going to integrate UPI to help the Indian diaspora receive and send money abroad with ease. The service will become operational from second quarter of 2022. IndusInd Bank and Thailand based financial service provider DeeMoney will use UPI ID to verify customers in India for cross border transaction. This is part of the Money Transfer Operator (MTO) partners programme of NPCI. IndusInd Bank is planning to collaborate with more foreign entities to increase acceptability of UPI abroad. NIPL on 27 January 2022 signed MoU with Netherlands-based Terra Payment Services that will help UPI users receive international payments from around the globe in real time.

To save the cost borne by Indians living abroad when sending money back home, NPCI is planning to move 32 million expatriate population from SWIFT to UPI. The 2022 Russian invasion of Ukraine and removal of Russian banks from SWIFT made development of an alternative all the more important for Indian policy makers.

From 30 April 2023, international mobile numbers from Malaysia, Singapore, Australia, Canada, Hong Kong, Oman, Qatar, USA, Saudi Arabia, UAE, and the UK will be able to access the UPI transaction facility. It will be available through non-resident external (NRE) and non-resident ordinary (NRO) accounts. Customers of Axis Bank, DBS Bank, ICICI Bank, Indian Bank, Indian Overseas Bank, and State Bank of India can now utilize the remittance facility between Singapore and India via the BHIM, Paytm, and PhonePe applications, according to an 11 January 2024 announcement from NPCI. Soon, more banks are anticipated to be connected, including HDFC Bank, Bank of Baroda, Bank of India, Canara Bank, Central Bank of India, Federal Bank, IDFC First Bank, IndusInd Bank, Karur Vysya Bank, Kotak Mahindra Bank, Punjab National Bank, South Indian Bank, and UCO Bank.

NPCI International and Eurobank Ergasias signed MoU on 29 February 2024 to enhance cross border payments using UPI. On 10 June 2024, STICPAY announced the integration of UPI into its platform. This eliminated the requirement for traditional banking infrastructure for Indian customers to make both domestic and international money transfers. Additionally, the integration is intended to help Indian businesses.

== Acceptance ==
=== India (Domestic) ===
United Arab Emirates and Singapore, both of which have sizeable Indian expatriate populations, have begun regarding the operation of UPI in those countries; this would also facilitate ease of payment for Indian tourists traveling there. A committee on digital payments led by Nandan Nilekani had suggested that NPCI should internationalise payment services like UPI, RuPay and BHIM. NPCI is planning to link UPI with standalone mobile wallets so that users can transfer money from one provider to another one which until now is restricted due to use of closed source technology. There is also provision for off-line UPI payment through the use of near field communication (NFC).

From 5 September 2019, Play Store enabled UPI for purchasing apps, games and in-app content. On 20 April 2020, Google added support for UPI payment in India to buy membership of YouTube Premium and YouTube Music either directly through a website or on the mobile application. Now Indian users can also buy or rent movies from Google TV. UPI is also enabled for the YouTube SuperChat feature.

From July 2021, Apple iPhone, iPad, and IPod Touch users in India can use UPI on App Store and iTunes Store. As of 2021 NPCI International Payments Limited (NIPL) was planning to extend UPI to markets in the United States, West Asia and Europe. On 4 August 2021, ICICI Prudential Life Insurance started supporting UPI AutoPay feature for insurance payment.

In August 2021, Dish TV introduced UPI scan and pay feature for the first time in a nationwide rollout due to COVID-19 restriction and heavy demand for no contact digital payment solutions. From 31 August 2021, Netflix integrated UPI AutoPay feature for Indian subscribers which was until now limited to credit and debit cards from Visa, Mastercard, American Express, and Diners Club International. As per April 2021 RBI Monetary Policy Committee directive, after 31 March 2022, all the "know your customer" (KYC)-compliant digital wallets will become interoperable by using UPI system. In August 2021, Hotstar started supporting UPI AutoPay feature. The Hindu, Times Prime, PayU, Financial Software and Systems, Testbook Edu Solutions, Open Financial Technologies, Angel Broking and 5Paisa Capital moved to UPI AutoPay in September 2021.

Due to high usage, Samsung Electronics integrated UPI barcode scanner directly into mobile camera application for faster payment. On 3 January 2022, SonyLIV launched UPI AutoPay for all its subscribers. NPCI with Jio introduced UPI AutoPay for prepaid and postpaid mobile subscribers from 6 January 2022. Tata Mutual Fund with CAMSPay enabled UPI AutoPay feature for Systematic Investment Plan (SIP) from July 2022. Google Play started supporting UPI AutoPay for subscription services from 15 November 2022. Bangalore Metropolitan Transport Corporation (BMTC) & Tamil Nadu State Transport Corporation (TNSTC) will start UPI based ticketing system from 2023. Lucknow Municipal Corporation (LMC) in collaboration with Paytm setting up QR code for housing tax.

Kotak Mahindra Bank has rolled out the UPI payment facility for the Goods and Services Tax Network (GSTN) in the following states: Assam, Delhi, Goa, Gujarat, Haryana, Himachal Pradesh, Kerala, Madhya Pradesh, Maharashtra, and Odisha. On 25 January 2024, North Western Karnataka Road Transport Corporation (NWKRTC) achieved a significant milestone by processing over one lakh UPI transactions, valued at over ₹2 crore. Additionally, the Karnataka State Road Transport Corporation (KSRTC), is also planning to accept UPI payments. The Metropolitan Transport Corporation (MTC) has provided new handheld devices with UPI capability to its bus conductors in Pallavaram. Other bus depots in Chennai will also be included in the pilot experiment in future. For all MTC buses, the Tamil Nadu Infrastructure Development Board (TNIDB) intends to implement a QR-based ticketing system for UPI payment. NPCI has integrated Kendriya Vidyalaya Sangathan with the Bharat Bill Payment System, allowing pupils to pay their school fees with UPI.

UPI-based ticketing system made accessible from June 2024 at Kolkata Metro Blue Line. Automatic Smart Card Recharge Machine has already incorporated it. Additionally, Kolkata Metro Green Line stations also have UPI facility. Kolkata Metro Orange Line were made UPI enabled from July 2024.

With the goal of reducing reliance on third-party apps, minimizing unsuccessful payments, and streamlining the checkout process, Zomato and Swiggy launched their own UPI services. Zomato partnered with ICICI Bank, whereas Swiggy is utilizing the UPI Plugin to enable payment, doing away with the need for a TPAP license. The implementation of UPI for transactions in government offices has been approved by the Kerala Finance Department on 25 July 2024. UPI payment methods for temple offerings have also been implemented by the Travancore Devaswom Board.

Under schemes like Rebate of State and Central Taxes and Levies (RoSCTL) and Remission of Duties and Taxes on Exported Products (RoDTEP), Indian government will permit the payment of customs duties via UPI and expand its use beyond duty payments to include expedited processing of refunds and incentives.

=== International ===
Cross border digital payment service provider Liquid Group signed memorandum of understanding (MoU) with NIPL in September 2021 to introduce UPI based QR code payment system in Singapore, Malaysia, Thailand, Philippines, Vietnam, Cambodia, Hong Kong, Taiwan, South Korea, and Japan from 2022. NIPL signed MoU with Arab Monetary Fund (AMF) on 8 March 2022 to link UPI with Buna Payment Platform that is connected with the central banks and financial institutions from Arab region. This will help in cross border multi currency transaction. Till 4 July 2022, India already initiated talks with 30 countries for UPI integration.

==== Singapore ====
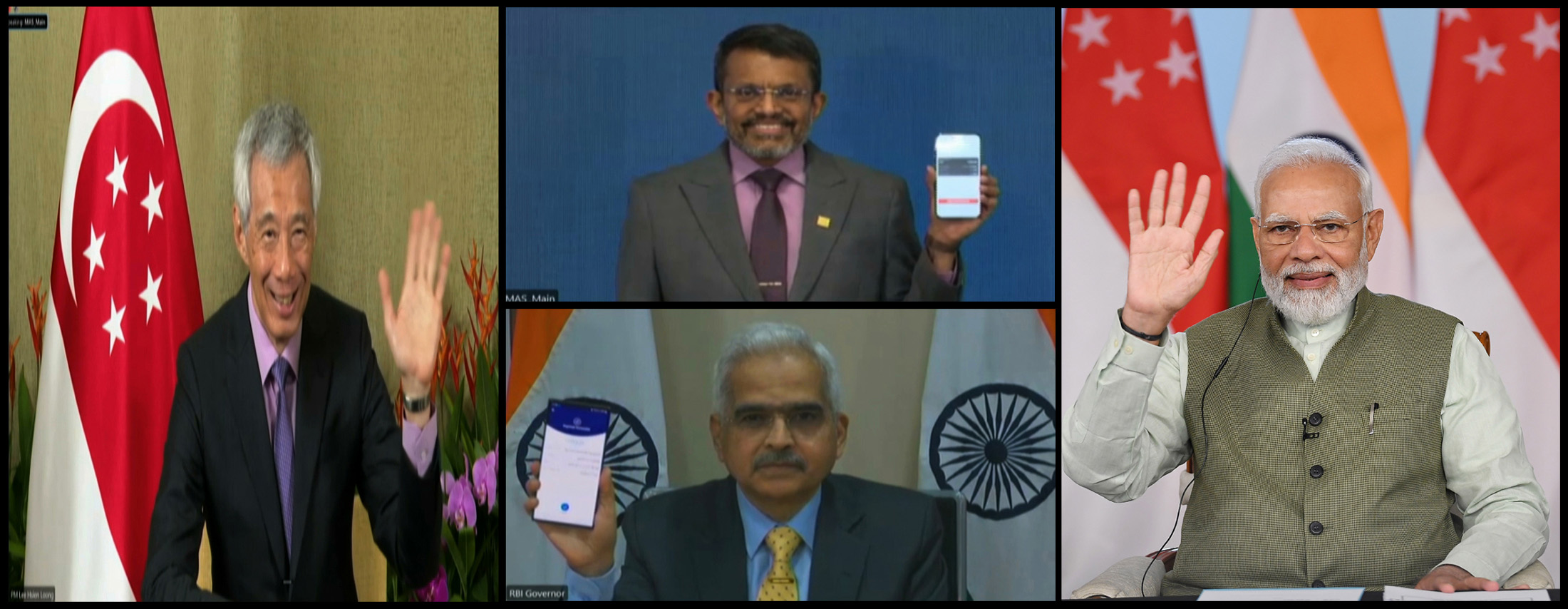
Singapore's Prime Minister Lee Hsien Loong with the Indian Prime Minister Narendra Modi during the Virtual Launch of UPI-PayNow Linkage.

UPI has been integrated with Singapore's similar payment system called PayNow. The PayNow is Singapore's equivalent of India's UPI, just like UPI the PayNow is also a near-instant payment system developed by Association of Banks in Singapore. PayNow interface facilitates inter-bank peer-to-peer and person-to-merchant transactions. The system is supported by all major Singaporean banks and is regulated by the Monetary Authority of Singapore (MAS) and works by transferring funds between two bank accounts. Same as UPI, the PayNow, can send payments to vendors or others just by sending payments to their phone number or via Virtual Payment Address (VPA). Payments can be made to any registered Singaporean mobile number, NRIC, corporate Unique Entity Number (UEN) or Virtual Payment Address (VPA), or by scanning QR codes. After the UPI and pay now integration, the people with Indian UPI can make online or real life payments in Singapore to anyone who has PayNow facilities sending money to the mobile number, QR Code, or VAN, etc. Similarly anyone who has Singapore's pay now can send money to people or businesses who have UPI.

UPI is accepted at merchant locations to ease transaction experience of Indian tourists. The Reserve Bank of India (RBI) and Monetary Authority of Singapore (MAS) initiated a project to operationalise interoperability between UPI and PayNow in September 2021.

The same channel in future will help connect Indian and ASEAN economies. Close to 3,000 transactions per month are happening through a sharp reduction in remittance costs. From 22 March 2025, HitPay will allow Indian travelers pay at restaurants, shops, and tourist destinations using UPI. It will remove inconvenience of currency exchange and international fees. In order to increase UPI's accessibility for both online and in-store purchases, more than 12,000 retailers in Singapore are expected to accept it as a form of payment.

==== Bhutan ====
On 13 July 2021, UPI was made available to Bhutan through Royal Monetary Authority of Bhutan. Bhutan became the first country to accept UPI transactions through the BHIM app.

==== Malaysia ====
In 2021, Malaysian company Merchantrade Asia partnered with NIPL to send remittance in India through UPI infrastructure. Following talks with Malaysian Prime Minister Anwar Ibrahim, Indian Prime Minister Narendra Modi declared on August 20, 2024, that his country intends to link its UPI with PayNet.

==== United Arab Emirates ====
LuLu Financial Holding, a subsidiary of LuLu Group International signed MoU with NIPL in August 2021, to offer real time remittance to India from United Arab Emirates (UAE) and the Middle Eastern region. The MoU will help LuLu Financial Holding and its affiliates to connect with the UPI infrastructure and help in validation, compliance checks and facilitate all the requisite protocols for a safer cross border monetary transaction. NIPL tied up with Mashreq bank in 2021 to increase UPI person-to-person (P2P) and person to merchant (P2M) transactions in UAE.

Network International on 18 November 2021 signed MoU with NIPL for acceptance of UPI in UAE through its network. Merchants under Network International will be able to accept UPI payment from Q1 2022. On 21 April 2022, UPI went live and started accepting payment through NeoPay, a payment subsidiary of Mashreq bank. India also signed an agreement with UAE to link UPI with Integrated Payment Platform (IPP).

On 29 March 2024, PhonePe announced that its users can pay with UPI at NeoPay terminals. The currency exchange rate will be shown and customers' accounts will be debited in Indian rupees. To make payments easier, Indians living abroad who have mobile numbers in the UAE can download the PhonePe app and link their current NRE and NRO accounts. PhonePe will also launch inbound remittance services as soon as the corridor for inward remittances is activated, eliminating the need for information like bank account numbers and IFSC codes.

Leading grocery chain in the United Arab Emirates, Al Maya Supermarkets, announced on 22 July 2024, that UPI payments would be accepted at all of its locations. UPI Payments are now available at all of LuLu's UAE locations. All Indian visitors have to do is scan their UPI QR code using the POS terminals at LuLu stores. For this, they can pay for items in the UAE with the RuPay card or their UPI-enabled apps using their Indian phone number. The money connected to their Indian bank accounts is used to make the payment.

==== France ====
NIPL signed MoU with French payment company Lyra Network, that will allow Indian tourists and students make payment using UPI in France. France wants to offer Indian tourists visiting the famous Eiffel Tower in Paris the option to pay using UPI. On 2 February 2024, NPCI and Lyra officially debuted UPI at Eiffel Tower. The ability to scan QR codes with UPI has been made available for payment. Although there is limited physical implementation, UPI is accepted as payment on the Eiffel Tower official website for ticket bookings. Other well-known portals, however, yet to implement it.

As of 3 July 2024, Galeries Lafayette on Haussmann Boulevard has been taking payments through UPI. On 3 July 2024, UPI was introduced in Paris. Charles de Gaulle Airport, and Nice Côte d'Azur Airport will have UPI enabled by July 2026.

==== Oman ====
NPCI signed MoU with Central Bank of Oman on 4 October 2022 to connect UPI with similar system in Oman on a reciprocal basis. It will make UPI QR code based payment available in the country and make it easier for Indian diaspora to send their remittance money in a cost effective way. on 16 December 2023, Indian foreign secretary informed that both sides discussed utilizing the UPI stack with the potential corresponding digital stack in the Omani ecosystem.

==== Qatar ====
Commercial Bank of Qatar announced launch of UPI service for remittance on 15 March 2023. The transactions can be completed within 60 seconds and will be available 24 hours, 7 days a week. On 11 July 2024, NIPL and QNB Group signed a deal for the introduction of QR-code-based UPI payments via the QNB merchant network throughout Qatar. This strategic initiative, according to Adel Ali Al-Malki, senior executive vice president of QNB Group Retail Banking, would boost the travel and hospitality industries and enable local businesses to prosper in a fast-paced digital economy. In February 2025, Indian Ambassador Vipul declared the full implementation of UPI at the Web Summit Qatar.

The first retailer to accept UPI transactions using QR codes is Qatar Duty Free. UPI acceptance at specific point-of-sale terminals was made possible by a collaboration between NIPL, QNB Group, and the Japanese payment gateway NETSTARS.

==== Mauritius ====
The Ministry of External Affairs of India declared that on 12 February 2024, UPI will be introduced in Mauritius. Prime Minister Narendra Modi and Prime Minister Pravind Jugnauth of Mauritius will formally inaugurate the service via video conference, according to the Reserve Bank of India. With this launch, Indian nationals visiting Mauritius and Mauritius nationals traveling to India will both be able to access UPI settlement services.

==== Israel ====
In February 2026, India and Israel agreed to extend India's UPI to operate in Israel as part of bilateral agreements announced during Prime Minister Narendra Modi's visit. According to Moneycontrol, the deal enables UPI-based payments to be used in Israel.

==== Cambodia ====
In order to facilitate UPI acceptance throughout Cambodia and Bakong (KHQR) acceptance throughout India, NIPL announced cooperation on 4 December 2025, with ACLEDA Bank. UPI launched in Cambodia on 2 June 2026. Governor Chea Serey of the National Bank of Cambodia and officials from the Reserve Bank of India attended a ceremony in Phnom Penh when the launch was publicly announced. The occasion signaled the start of the cross-border QR payment between Cambodia and India. Travelers from Cambodia will be able to utilize UPI QR codes at Indian retailers after Phase-2 deployment.

==== Uzbekistan ====
On 30 August 2026, NIPL and the National Interbank Processing Center JSC (NIPC), which runs Uzbekistan's national payment system, HUMO, signed a commercial agreement. Through the cooperation, Indian tourists can use UPI-enabled apps to instantly pay merchants throughout Uzbekistan by scanning the country's interoperable QR code, UZQR. The Central Bank of Uzbekistan and the Reserve Bank of India formally approved the arrangement, designating HUMO as NIPL's authorized partner for cross-border merchant acceptance.

== Technology export to foreign nations ==
As of 2025, India has exported UPI technology to 25 countries which are using this modular open source digital identity and payment platform.

=== Africa ===
- Namibia:
  - To create an immediate payment system for Namibia that is similar to UPI, NIPL and the Bank of Namibia (BoN) signed a deal on 2 May 2024. Enhancing interoperability, cost, and connectivity with local and worldwide payment networks are all part of this. Strengthening digital financial services and supporting real-time merchant (P2M) and person-to-person (P2P) payments are the goals. Kenya, Rwanda and Mozambique are also in negotiations with India. In order to share UPI as part of digital public infrastructure solutions, India signed memorandums of understanding with Antigua & Barbuda, Armenia, Sierra Leone, and Suriname in June 2023.

=== Americas ===
- Peru
  - On 5 June 2024, NIPL and the Central Reserve Bank of Peru signed an agreement for the deployment of Unified Payments Interface stack, which will aid in the development of the Peru's quick payment system. It will enable instantaneous payments between people and companies and increase the utilization of digital payments among unbanked people. With two launches anticipated by early 2027, NPCI is in discussions with nations in Africa and South America to assist them in developing digital payment systems that use UPI as a model.
- Trinidad and Tobago.
  - A collaboration between NIPL and the Ministry of Digital Transformation (MDT) was announced on September 27, 2024, with the aim of creating a UPI-like real-time payments infrastructure that can facilitate P2P and P2M transactions for Trinidad and Tobago.
- United States
  - A pilot effort to connect Zelle to UPI is being worked on by the Bank of America. The initiative is being developed in collaboration with Zelle's network operator, Early Warning Services. The Zelle-UPI bridge's primary aim will be remittances. By the end of 2026, Zelle intends to grow its peer-to-peer payment business in India.

=== Asia ===
- Asean "Project Nexus":
  - The Bank for International Settlements signed an agreement with Central Bank of Malaysia, Bank of Thailand, Bangko Sentral ng Pilipinas, Monetary Authority of Singapore, and the Reserve Bank of India on 30 June 2024 as founding member of Project Nexus, a multilateral international initiative to enable retail cross-border payments. Bank Indonesia involved as a special observer. The platform, which is expected to go live by 2026, will interlink domestic fast payment systems of the member countries.

== Studies on UPI ==
This digital revolution brought about by UPI has also led to a significant influx of scams and fraudulent activities. As more users adopt this convenient payment system, scammers have increasingly exploited vulnerabilities in digital transactions. One reason why scammers adopt this method is, it is almost impossible to reverse the transaction. As per RBI's annual report in 2023–24, 29,082 digital frauds (card/internet) were reported amounting to ₹1,457 crore (US$160 million).

The Indian Institute of Management Bangalore, Indian School of Business, Fuqua School of Business (Duke University), and the Centre for Advanced Financial Research and Learning (CAFRAL) conducted a joint study titled Open Banking and Digital Payments: Implications for Credit Access. They found that UPI has made it possible for underserved borrowers to obtain formal credit for the first time. In areas where UPI adoption is high, loans to new credit borrowers have increased by 4%, while loans to subprime borrowers have increased by 8%. As an example of how digital financial records helped lenders better evaluate applicants, the authors pointed out that a 10% increase in UPI transactions resulted in a 7% increase in credit availability. UPI-enabled digital transaction data helped lenders grow responsibly, as evidenced by the fact that default rates did not increase despite the lending boom.

== Outage and downtime ==
- On 12 April 2025, UPI had its largest outage in more than three years, which lasted over five hours. The NPCI stated that the lack of a transaction status check limitation in the system architecture was the cause of the outage. The 'Check transaction' API flooding was found to be the root of the problem. Additionally, it was noted that several banks that provided payment services were repeatedly requesting "Check transactions," even for previous transactions. According to the NPCI's operating guidelines, banks are specifically only permitted to check the progress of a transaction three times, with a 90-second gap between requests. At its firewall, NPCI did not implement a rate restriction to prevent API calls that exceeded three requests. However, rather than using NPCI's infrastructure, the banks themselves were supposed to enforce this restriction. On 12 April 2025, NPCI noticed a decline in UPI success rates. Between 11.40 a.m. and 4.40 p.m., the success rate dropped to approximately 50% for the next two hours and then to about 80% for the next three. The success rate stabilized at 4:40 p.m. on 12 April 2025.
- A nationwide UPI outage that disrupted transactions occurred on August 7, 2025. Users of Google Pay, PhonePe, Paytm were unable to make purchases, at approximately 7:45 p.m. Transactions at HDFC Bank, State Bank of India, Bank of Baroda, and Kotak Mahindra Bank, were interrupted by the malfunction. According to Downdetector, 8% of customers reported app-related issues, 29% encountered issues with money transfers, and 62% had trouble processing payments. A small number of banks were experiencing internal technical issues, according to NPCI. The UPI service was operational again.

== Misuse ==
The Bangalore Mirror reported on 7 August 2025, that inmates at Bangalore Central Prison are allegedly utilizing UPI apps like PhonePe and Google Pay to extort money from people outside the jail. According to reports, the prisoners are threatening ex-offenders who are free on bail via WhatsApp calls, threatening to harm them if they do not pay funds to designated UPI IDs. After associates outside take these transactions out, the money is returned to the prison. To determine the total amount extorted, investigators have tracked down 14 UPI IDs that were reportedly used by prisoners and have asked banks for transaction records.

== See also ==
- Unified Lending Interface
- Aadhaar
- BHIM
- Pix
- India Stack
- Payment gateway
- Merchant account
- Immediate Payment Service
- National Payments Corporation of India
- Open Network for Digital Commerce
- Buy Now Pay Later
- Zelle
- QRIS
