= Zelle =

Digital payments network

- Formerly: clearXchange
- Type: Private
- Industry: Payment service; Payment network; Mobile app
- Founded: 2016; 10 years ago
- Headquarters: Scottsdale, Arizona, United States
- Services: Electronic funds transfer
- Parent: Early Warning Services, LLC
- Website: zelle.com

Zelle (/zɛl/) is an American digital payments network run by a private financial services company owned by Bank of America, Truist, Capital One, JPMorgan Chase, PNC Bank, U.S. Bank, and Wells Fargo. The Zelle service enables individuals to electronically transfer money from their bank account to another registered user's bank account (within the United States) using a mobile device or the website of a participating banking institution. Transfers between bank accounts of registered users are typically completed within minutes. There is currently no fee or charge on the transaction to users. Instead, participating banking institutions are charged a fee per transaction.

The Zelle service was launched in June 2017, as the successor to the clearXchange payment service. Zelle has expanded, and as of 2022, 80% of the US population could connect to Zelle through their banking app, with over 1,600 financial institutions participating. Zelle has been criticized for being a platform that has facilitated online financial fraud in the United States.

In April 2025, Zelle shut down its standalone app, requiring all users to interact with Zelle through their bank's app.

== History ==
Zelle originated as clearXchange, a payments service launched in April 2011 by Bank of America, JPMorgan Chase, and Wells Fargo. The platform enabled person-to-person, business-to-consumer, and government-to-consumer payments.

By 2015, clearXchange had expanded to include US Bank and Capital One as owner-members. That same year, it announced the availability of a real-time payments system. In 2016, clearXchange was acquired by Early Warning Services, a financial technology company. At the time of the acquisition, Early Warning was owned by Bank of America, US Bank, Chase, Capital One, Wells Fargo, PNC Bank, and BB&T, which would later become Truist. The following year, Early Warning introduced Zelle and announced the phaseout of clearXchange's person-to-person service.

In March 2019, Early Warning Services CEO Paul Finch stepped down to work for his family's charitable foundation. In May 2019, Early Warning Services appointed a new CEO, Albert Ko, who was formerly the chief transformation officer for Intuit.

By the end of 2022, Zelle was offered by approximately 1,800 financial institutions and reached about 80% of Americans with bank accounts, processing $1.6 billion in daily transactions. In August 2023, Early Warning appointed Cameron Fowler as chief executive officer, succeeding Albert Ko. In September 2024, Denise Leonhard, formerly of Venmo, PayPay, and American Express, became general manager of Zelle.

During 2024, Zelle processed over $1 trillion in transactions, with approximately $283 billion being sent or received by small businesses. By the end of that year, Zelle was connecting 151 million consumer and small business bank accounts. In December 2024, the Consumer Financial Protection Bureau (CFPB) filed a lawsuit against Early Warning Services (EWS), the operator of Zelle, along with three major banks: Bank of America, JPMorgan Chase, and Wells Fargo. The lawsuit alleged that these entities "failed to properly investigate fraud complaints or give victims reimbursement." The CFPB dismissed the lawsuit with prejudice in March of 2025. New York Attorney General Letitia James filed a similar lawsuit against Zelle in 2025.

In April 2025, Zelle discontinued its standalone mobile app, requiring customers to access the service through participating banks' applications. As of July 2025, Zelle was offered by 2,300 financial institutions, with 95 percent of those institutions being either community banks or credit unions.

== Service ==
Zelle is a digital payments network in the United States that enables person-to-person money transfers. It is available to individuals or small businesses that have a U.S.-based checking or savings account with a participating bank or credit union. Transactions are typically settled within minutes, moving directly from the sender’s bank account to the recipient’s bank account without Zelle holding the funds.

Zelle does not charge users any fees for sending, receiving, or requesting money. The same is true of the majority of the financial institutions within the payments network. Its principal competitor is PayPal and its Venmo payment service.

== Criticism ==
The Zelle service has received negative publicity due to fraud incidents where bank customers’ accounts were compromised through social engineering tactics. In these cases, fraudsters set up Zelle accounts in the victims’ names and used them to transfer funds out of the victims’ accounts, often leaving the victims with limited practical or legal options for recovery. In one case, a Florida man pled guilty to defrauding victims of $250,000 by convincing them to make payments using Zelle to reverse purported fraudulent transactions. In some cases, bank customers have been compensated by the banks involved, depending upon the bank and its policies and the specifics of the incident. Banks may use secondary confirmation methods such as SMS or otherwise place limits on newly created accounts and transfers to recently added recipients as a preventive measure. Shortly before releasing a critical report, Senator Elizabeth Warren criticized Zelle executives at a September 2022, Senate Banking Committee hearing, both for lack of refunds in cases of fraud, and lack of response to requests for statistics.

== See also ==
- TARGET Instant Payment Settlement, in the Eurozone
- Wero (payment), in France, Belgium, Germany and The Netherlands
- Unified Payments Interface, in India
- New Payments Platform, in Australia
- Interac e-Transfer, in Canada
- Pix, in Brazil
- QRIS, in Indonesia
