= InstaPay =

InstaPay may refer to:

- InstaPay (Egypt), an instant payment system by the Central Bank of Egypt
- InstaPay (Philippines), an electronic fund transfer services by BancNet
