= National Payments Corporation of India =

Umbrella organisation for operating retail payments and settlement systems in India

- Type: Section 8
- Industry: Payments
- Founded: 19 December 2008; 17 years ago
- Headquarters: Mumbai, Maharashtra, India
- Key people: Ajay Kumar Choudhary (Non-Exe Chairman); Dilip Asbe (MD & CEO)
- Products: Aadhaar Enabled Payment System; Bharat Connect; BHIM; Cheque Truncation System; Digital Rupee; Immediate Payment Service; National Automated Clearing House; National Common Mobility Card; National Financial Switch; NUUP Services; Query Service on Aadhaar Mapper (*99*99#); RuPay; Unified Payments Interface; BharatQR; UPI Lite; UPI 123
- Revenue: ₹39.69 billion (FY2025–26)
- Net income: ₹13.62 billion (FY2025-26)
- Owner: Joint-venture of PSBs
- Website: npci.org.in

National Payments Corporation of India (NPCI) is an Indian public sector company that operates retail payments and settlement systems in India. The organization is an initiative of the Reserve Bank of India (RBI) and the Indian Banks' Association (IBA) under the provisions of the Payment and Settlement Systems Act, 2007, for creating a robust payment and settlement infrastructure in India.

== Organisation ==
Founded in December 2008, the NPCI is a government organisation registered under Section 8 of the Companies Act 2013, established by the Reserve Bank of India and the Indian Banks' Association. The organisation is owned by a Government of India, and has been promoted by the country's central bank, the Reserve Bank of India. The NPCI was incorporated in December 2008 and the Certificate of Commencement of Business was issued in April 2009. The authorised capital has been pegged at ₹3 billion (US$31 million) and paid-up capital is ₹1 billion (US$10 million).

Initially, there were ten promoter banks viz. State Bank of India, Punjab National Bank, Canara Bank, Bank of Baroda, Union Bank of India, Bank of India, ICICI Bank, HDFC Bank, Citibank and HSBC. In 2016, the shareholding was diluted to include 13 additional public sector banks, 15 additional private sector banks, 1 additional foreign bank, 10 multi-state co-operative banks and 7 regional rural banks. The Board consists of Biswamohan Mahapatra as the Non Executive Chairman, Nominees from the Reserve Bank of India and Nominees from ten core promoter banks. Dilip Asbe is the current managing director and chief executive officer of the NPCI after A. P. Hota, who retired from the post on 10 August 2017.

=== NPCI International Payments Limited (NIPL) ===
NPCI has created a separate subsidiary to take its product to the global market. The organization is getting offers from nations around Asia, Africa and the Middle East to improve their payment infrastructure. Internationalization of RuPay and Unified Payment Interface (UPI) are the primary focus of the NPCI International Payments Limited (NIPL).

In 2021, Malaysian company Merchantrade Asia partnered with NIPL to send remittances to India through UPI infrastructure.

To make it easier for UPI payments to be accepted in France, NPCI International Payments (NIPL) has teamed up with Lyra, a proximity payments and e-commerce firm based in France. Starting with the Eiffel Tower, the strategic partnership guarantees a smooth integration of the UPI payment method.

NIPL and the Central Reserve Bank of Peru will collaborate to establish a quick payments infrastructure in the South American nation that is akin to UPI. A key component of this collaboration has been the Reserve Bank of India's backing. Through the agreement, the Central Reserve Bank of Peru is able to set up a fast and effective real-time payments infrastructure for the nation and individuals as well as businesses.

=== NPCI Bharat BillPay Limited (NBBL) ===
As from April 2024, NPCI created a new subsidiary for Bharat Bill Payment System (BBPS) to increase growth especially in business to consumer segment for small businesses. This is done in view of growing traffic and workload from UPI, IMPS, Aadhaar Enabled Payment System and National Electronic Toll Collections. NBBL is a public company registered in December 2020.

== Services ==
The corporation's current and future service portfolio includes:

=== Aadhaar Enabled Payment System (AePS) ===
A network of Micro ATMs using Aadhaar authentication. National Payments Corporation of India (NPCI) announced the transactions of Aadhaar Enabled Payment System (AePS) for the month of July 2019 have crossed the milestone number of 200 million. AePS is a bank-led model which allows basic interoperable banking transactions at PoS (MicroATM) through the Business correspondent of any bank by using Aadhaar authentication. AePS had a transaction value of ₹22,350.88 crore and a volume of 8.396 crore in January 2024.

=== Bharat Bill Payment System (BBPS) ===
The Bharat Bill Payment System is a Reserve Bank of India (RBI) conceptualised system driven by the NPCI. It is a one-stop ecosystem for payment of all bills, providing an interoperable and accessible "Anytime Anywhere" bill payment service to all customers across India with certainty, reliability and safety. Bharat BillPay has multiple modes of payment and provides instant confirmation of payment via an SMS or receipt. It offers myriad bill collection categories like electricity, telecom, DTH, gas, water bills etc. through a single window. More categories may be added in the future, to include insurance premium, mutual funds, school fees, institution fees, credit cards, local taxes, invoice payments, etc. An effective mechanism for handling consumer complaints has also been put in place. Bharat BillPay transactions can be initiated through multiple payment channels like Internet, Internet Banking, Mobile, Mobile-Banking, POS (Point of Sale terminal), Mobile Wallets, MPOS (Mobile Point of Sale terminal), Kiosk, ATM, Bank Branch, Agents and Business Correspondents. Bharat BillPay supports multiple payment modes. This includes Cards (Credit, Debit and Prepaid), NEFT Internet Banking, UPI, Wallets, Aadhaar based Payments and Cash.

=== BharatQR ===
A common QR code developed by NPCI in collaboration with American Express, Mastercard and Visa for ease of payments and interoperability.

=== BHIM ===
BHIM is a mobile app to act as Client software for the Unified Payments Interface.

==== BHIM Aadhaar Pay ====
BHIM Aadhaar pay is an Aadhaar based payments interface which allows real time payments to Merchants using Aadhaar number of Customer & authenticating them through their biometrics.

=== Cheque Truncation System (CTS) ===
CTS is based on a cheque truncation or online image-based cheque clearing system where cheque images and magnetic ink character recognition (MICR) data are captured at the collecting bank branch and transmitted electronically.

=== Digital Rupee ===
The Digital Rupee (e₹) or eINR or E-Rupee is a tokenised digital version of the Indian Rupee, to be issued by the Reserve Bank of India (RBI) as a central bank digital currency (CBDC). The Digital Rupee was proposed in January 2017 and will be launched in the 2022-23 financial year. The plan is to incorporate distributed ledger into Digital Rupee.

Like banknotes it will be uniquely identifiable and regulated by Central Bank. Liability lies with RBI. Plans include online and offline accessibility. RBI will launch Digital Rupee for Wholesale (e₹-W) catering to financial institutions for interbank settlements and Digital Rupee for Retail (e₹-R) for consumer and business transactions. CBDC will remove ₹4,984.80 crore security printing cost borne by the general public, businesses, banks, and RBI on physical currency.

=== Immediate Payment Service (IMPS) ===
Immediate Payment Service is a real time inter bank payment system.

- Mobile number & MMID: Send money to bank accounts mapped using mobile number.
- Account number & IFSC: Send money to bank accounts.

=== National Automated Clearing House ===
A centralised clearing service that aims at providing interbank high volume, low value transactions that are repetitive and periodic in nature.

=== National Common Mobility Card - Rupay Contactless ===
Rupay Contactless is a contactless payment technology that allows cardholders to wave their card in front of contactless payment terminals without the need to physically swipe or insert the card into a point-of-sale device.

=== National Electronic Toll Collection ===
FASTag is a device that employs Radio Frequency Identification (RFID) technology for making toll payments directly while the vehicle is in motion. FASTag (RFID Tag) is affixed on the windscreen of the vehicle and enables a customer to make the toll payments directly from the account which is linked to FASTag. The latest version 2.0 can also be used to buy fuel. IDFC First Bank has become the first one to get an approval from the RBI. The Ministry of Road Transport and Highways (MoRTH) has declared that all lanes at all toll plazas on national highways across the country will be dedicated Fastag lanes from 1 December 2019.

=== National Financial Switch ===
Network of shared automated teller machines in India.

=== RuPay ===
RuPay is a domestic card scheme of India. The card has Magnetic stripe (for Backward compatibility) and an EMV chip. RuPay cards are now accepted at all ATMs, Point-of-Sale terminals and most online merchants in the country. More than 300 cooperative banks and Regional Rural Banks (RRBs) in the country have also issued RuPay ATM cards.

=== Unified Payments Interface (UPI) ===
Unified Payments Interface is a real-time interbank payment system for sending or receiving money. It is integrated with more than 358 banks in India. Consumers can participate in P2P transfer as long as they both have an account in one of the registered banks. To initiate fund transfer, users have to use any UPI supporting Android or iOS app, link their bank accounts and generate BHIM UPI PIN. Funds can be transferred via the following methods:

- Virtual Payment Address (VPA): Send or request money from/to bank account mapped using VPA.
- Account number & IFSC: Send money to bank account.
- QR code: Send money by scanning QR code with enclosed VPA or Account number & IFSC.
- Mobile number: Send or request money from/to the bank account mapped using mobile number.
- Aadhaar: Send money to the bank account mapped using Aadhaar number.

Once the fund transfer is initiated, money is debited from payer's bank account and deposited in the recipient's bank account in real-time. This system works 24x7, including weekends and bank holidays.

Project Nexus

The Bank for International Settlements signed an agreement with Central Bank of Malaysia, Bank of Thailand, Bangko Sentral ng Pilipinas, Monetary Authority of Singapore, and the Reserve Bank of India on 30 June 2024 as founding member of Project Nexus, a multilateral international initiative to enable retail cross-border payments. Bank Indonesia involved as a special observer. The platform, which is expected to go live by 2026, will interlink domestic fast payment systems of the member countries.

=== *99# USSD ===
An USSD channel service for UPI mobile banking launched in November 2012. Only public sector telecom service provider Bharat Sanchar Nigam Limited BSNL and Mahanagar Telephone Nigam Limited MTNL are offering this service. It uses quick codes for transactions and doesn't require smartphone and access to internet. The interface is developed by National Unified USSD Platform (NUUP) to overcome the problem of poor internet connectivity in rural areas with 12 regional languages. This service is being currently offered by 51 banks. BHIM app also supports USSD features. Understanding the importance of mobile banking in financial inclusion in general and of *99# in particular, various regulatory/trade bodies came together to ensure on boarding of all TSPs on *99# (USSD 1.0). With the wider ecosystem (11 TSPs), *99# was launched by Prime minister Narendra Modi on 28 August 2014, as part of Pradhan Mantri Jan Dhan Yojna.

=== UPI 123PAY ===
It a 3-step method to initiate and execute UPI services for feature phone users without the use of internet connection or USSD channel. It is based on Interactive voice response (IVR) technology which is good specially for rural and urban areas. It is launched by RBI on 10 March 2022.

=== Digital Payments Score ===
A Digital Payments Score (DPS) will be developed by NPCI with the intention of bolstering the nation's credit scoring system and fostering increased productivity and expansion. When determining criteria, DPS may consider things like a person's financial stability, which includes timely payments, regular bill payments, and whether or not the person regularly transacts for high-value commodities and has the income to support them.

== Recent awards and recognition ==
- The NPCI was awarded Golden Peacock Innovative Product/Service Award for the year 2018 for BHIM UPI.
- The NPCI won Policy Change Agent of the Year 2018 by Economics Times.

== See also ==
- Aadhaar – Indian national identification number
- Bharat Bill Payment System – Integrated bill payment system in India
- Bharat Interface for Money – Indian mobile payments app
- Digital India – Online infrastructure in India
- Immediate Payment Service – Electronic funds transfer system in India
- India Stack – Indian digital public infrastructure branding
- Indian passport – Passport of the Republic of India issued to Indian citizens
- Indian ration card
- Merchant account – Type of business bank account for accepting payments
- Permanent account number – Code that acts as an identification for individuals, families and corporates
- RuPay – Indian multinational card payment service
- Unified Payments Interface – Indian instant payment system
- List of financial supervisory authorities by country
