= PayNow =

Digital payment system for inter-bank transfers in Singapore

- Product type: Instant real-time inter-bank payment system
- Current owner: Association of Banks in Singapore
- Produced by: Association of Banks in Singapore
- Country: Singapore
- Introduced: 10 July 2017; 9 years ago
- Markets: Singapore; International by cross border payment agreements
- Website: www.abs.org.sg/consumer-banking/pay-now

PayNow is a near-instant real-time payment system developed by Association of Banks in Singapore. The interface facilitates inter-bank peer-to-peer and person-to-merchant transactions. The system is supported by all major Singaporean banks and is regulated by the Monetary Authority of Singapore (MAS) and works by transferring funds between two bank accounts.

Payments can be made to any registered Singaporean mobile number, NRIC, corporate Unique Entity Number (UEN) or Virtual Payment Address (VPA). Scanning QR codes is also an option. PayNow is linked with other payment providers including Stripe, DuitNow (Malaysia), PromptPay (Thailand) and UPI (India).

In 2020, 125 million transactions worth S$22 billion were processed through PayNow.

== Discontinuation of nickname feature ==
The nickname feature, introduced in 2017, allowed users to hide their account names with nicknames for privacy reasons. However, from 6 June 2026, the nickname feature was discontinued, due to concerns of impersonation by scammers. Businesses who use Unique Entity Numbers (UENs) are unaffected as they do not have access to the nickname feature.

Instead, users' real names are displayed and partially censored by replacing some letters with X. Other symbols, such as the asterisk or dash, were not used since not all systems were able to handle special characters. This led to some backlash, since inappropriate words such as sex can derive from the surname See after partial censorship.

== International collaboration ==
=== Project Nexus ===
The Bank for International Settlements signed an agreement with Central Bank of Malaysia, Bank of Thailand, Bangko Sentral ng Pilipinas, Monetary Authority of Singapore, and the Reserve Bank of India on 30 June 2024 as founding member of Project Nexus, a multilateral international initiative to enable retail cross-border payments. Bank Indonesia participated as a special observer until February 2026 when it became a full member. The platform, which is expected to go live by 2026, will interlink domestic fast payment systems of the member countries.
