= PhonePe =

Indian financial technology company

- Company type: Private
- Website type: Digital payments & Financial services
- Available in: Multilingual (11)
- Founded: 2015; 11 years ago
- Headquarters: Salarpuria Softzone, Bengaluru, Karnataka, India
- Area served: India
- Founders: Sameer Nigam (Co-Founder & CEO); Rahul Chari (Co-Founder & CTO); Burzin Engineer (Co-Founder & CRO)
- Industry: Fintech, Financial services, Payment gateway
- Services: Payment systems; Financial services
- Revenue: ▲₹7,920 crore (US$820 million) (2026)
- Parent: Walmart
- Website: phonepe.com
- Commercial: Yes
- Registration: Required
- Users: 700 million
- Current status: Active
- Native clients on: Android iOS; Series 30+

PhonePe is an Indian digital payments and financial services company, headquartered in Bengaluru. It was founded in December 2015, by Sameer Nigam, Rahul Chari and Burzin Engineer. The PhonePe app, based on the Unified Payments Interface, went live in August 2016.

The PhonePe app is accessible in 11 Indian languages. It enables users to perform various financial transactions such as sending and receiving money, recharging mobile and DTH, making utility payments, conducting in-store payments.

== History ==
PhonePe was incorporated in December 2015. In April 2016, the company was acquired by Flipkart and as part of the acquisition, the FxMart license was transferred to PhonePe and rebranded as the PhonePe wallet. PhonePe's co-founder Sameer Nigam was appointed as the CEO of the company.

In August 2016, the company partnered with Yes Bank to launch a UPI-based mobile payment app, based on the government-backed UPI platform.

In December 2020, Flipkart and PhonePe declared a partial split, with Walmart maintaining its majority ownership in PhonePe and the two entities functioning independently. In 2022, PhonePe shifted its domicile to India from Singapore and completed separation from Flipkart.

In 2022, it launched international UPI payments, allowing Indian users traveling abroad to pay foreign merchants with Unified Payments Interface (UPI).

In 2022, PhonePe obtained licensing from the Reserve Bank of India for operating a Semi-Closed Prepaid Payment system.

In January 2023, PhonePe raised $350 million from General Atlantic, a US growth equity firm, at a pre-money valuation of $12 billion. It raised another $100 million in primary capital in February 2023 from Ribbit Capital, Tiger Global, and TVS Capital Funds, followed by $200 million in primary capital from Walmart, and another $100 million from General Atlantic at the same valuation.

In April 2023, PhonePe launched a new shopping app called 'Pincode', focused on hyperlocal e-commerce and built on top of the ONDC platform. In August 2023, PhonePe launched Share.Market, a stock broking and mutual fund investment platform, via its subsidiary PhonePe Wealth Broking. In February 2024, PhonePe introduced Indus Appstore, a mobile app store.

In April 2025, PhonePe converted into a public company and changed its name from PhonePe Private Limited to PhonePe Limited as part of its preparations for an initial public offering. According to media reports, in September 2025, PhonePe filed draft papers with SEBI for IPO via the confidential pre filing route.

In August 2026, PhonePe launched PhonePe UPI 123Pay for feature phones users to make UPI payments without an internet connection.

== Legal challenges ==
On 14 January 2017, ICICI Bank blocked PhonePe transactions, citing the reasons that it did not meet the NPCI guidelines. Initially, on 19 January 2017, NPCI instructed ICICI to allow UPI transactions via PhonePe. During this period, Airtel too blocked PhonePe transactions on its platforms. A day later, on 20 January 2017, NPCI renounced the previous instructions citing the reason that PhonePe indeed violated the UPI norms.

After this, PhonePe closed its operations on Flipkart's website, to align itself with the terms stated in the updated verdict from NPCI. By February 2017, PhonePe resolved the issues with ICICI and Airtel.

== ESOP ==
PhonePe allots employee stock options (ESOPs) to its full-time employees. In November 2021, PhonePe was reported to have conducted a buyback of ESOPs worth ₹1.35 billion (equivalent to ₹1.5 billion or US$15 million in 2026), covering 75% of its current workforce who have completed at least a year of service.

== See also ==
- E-commerce payment system
- Mobile payment
- Digital wallet
- List of online payment service providers
- Payment gateway
