= Peer-to-peer transaction =

Electronic money transfer

Peer-to-peer transactions (also referred to as person-to-person transactions, P2P transactions, or P2P payments) are electronic money transfers made from one person to another through an intermediary, typically referred to as a P2P payment application. P2P payments can be sent and received via mobile device or any home computer with access to the Internet, offering a convenient alternative to traditional payment methods.

Through the P2P payment application, each individual's account is linked to one or more of the user's bank accounts. When a transaction occurs, the account balance in the application records the transaction and either sends or pulls money directly to the user's bank account or stores it in the user's account within the application.

Since this concept's inception, many business entities have developed P2P transaction capabilities, increasing the competition in the space and the convenience brought to the consumer. The prevalence of mobile devices has also forced the adaptation of P2P payment applications to become more convenient for users.

== Historical background ==
=== Birth of eCommerce ===
P2P payment originated in Palo Alto, CA with a company called PayPal, which specialized in electronic money transfers. The payment system initially served to assist both eCommerce businesses and individuals, reaching massive scale following PayPal's acquisition by online retailer eBay in 2002. This event marked the beginning of the rapid growth of P2P transactions.

eBay's business model required a transaction intermediary to facilitate payments between customers and sellers, whether they be businesses or individuals. Buyers needed the service because they did not want to divulge credit card information to random sellers. Sellers needed the service because many consumers did not have the means to open up a credit card Merchant account to accept online payments. Peer-to-peer payments were now in full effect in the online marketplace.

=== Rise of smart mobile devices ===
Smartphone technology affected many aspects of modern-day life, one of those being the ability to transfer money to other people anywhere in the world within seconds. Right now, there are many innovators in the P2P transaction mobile space, with industry leaders such as PayPal, Venmo, Square, Inc., among myriad others. All of these apps allow users to easily send and receive payments in a short time frame, with little to no fees involved. The prevalence of smartphones allows most people to use their phones as a type of wallet, particularly when splitting bills or dealing with personal debts. P2P payment volume is expected to reach 86 billion dollars by 2018.

== Operation/functionality ==
P2P payment application functionality varies, but the processes generally follow a similar structure:

- First, the user downloads the application and creates an account and links it to a credit card, debit card, or bank account.
- Then the user can create contacts and send payments using another user's email address, phone number, or account handle.
- During a transaction, money is taken out of the user's account within the application and transferred to the receiving user's account. If there is not enough money in the account to complete the transaction, money is taken directly from the user's bank account to finish the transaction.

== Information and money security ==
In a survey conducted by the Federal Reserve, 42% of respondents said the reason they would not send money through a P2P payment application is because they are concerned about the security of their payments. Because of the ease of use and accessibility of large sums of money straight from individual's bank accounts, security measures have been put in place to minimize theft. Most applications require password-protected sign in or a pin number to access a user's account. Bank account and credit card information is encrypted. However, if there is a requirement for bank or credit card, its not a real peer-to-peer anymore.

There are some loopholes that some thieves have exploited. For example, Venmo's platform makes it look as though a payment is registered and complete immediately when the button is clicked, but the actual transaction does not process for a couple of days. Thieves can exploit this by pretending to send a payment to someone in exchange for something (i.e. Craigslist), which Venmo registers as a transaction. In reality, the transaction is not yet complete, meaning the payment can bounce back and be declined by the bank.

Although typical fail-safes come into play for worst-case scenarios, such as the $3,000 limit per week on Venmo transactions, financial institutions themselves may notify their customers of theft and fraud. P2P payment applications, as third party intermediaries, typically deflect responsibility to the banks and financial institutions who actually hold and process the user's transactions and funds.
