= Sarvatra Technologies =

Indian fintech company

- Type: Privately held company; Company limited by shares
- ISIN: INE190N01014
- Industry: Fintech; Banking software
- Founded: 22 June 2000; 26 years ago
- Founder: Mandar Agashe
- Headquarters: Pune, Maharashtra, India
- Area served: India
- Key people: Vallabh Bhanshali (Chairman); Mandar Agashe (Founder, managing director, vice chairman); Sumeet Phadnis (Chief executive officer); Deepak Ghaisas (Director)
- Products: Mobile banking app; Micro ATM; Merchant POS terminal; Aadhaar payment app; Cloud computing
- Services: EFT; IMPS; UPI; switching; Payment processing; Payment gateway; PaaS; SaaS
- Revenue: IN₹700,000,000 (2018)
- Total equity: IN₹144,462,416 (2022)
- Number of employees: ▲976 (2025); 597 (2023)
- Website: sarvatra.tech

Sarvatra Technologies Private Limited is an Indian fintech company, headquartered in Pune, Maharashtra, that provides banking software and cloud-based services to cooperative banks and smaller financial institutions. As of 2024, the company had a 55% market share in providing banking software to banks in India, with its PaaS model operating in 600 banks across India.

== History ==
=== 2000s ===
The company was founded on 22 June 2000 by Mandar Agashe and is headquartered in Pune, Maharashtra. The company initially worked in conjunction with Agashe's other financial technology companies, EBZ Online and Codito, developing banking software solutions. After securing a loan worth ₹35 million from his father's Suvarna Sahakari Bank in May 2002, the companies launched a point of sale (PoS) terminal called "Sarvatra" through the bank's 12 branches across Maharashtra in July 2003. The name Sarvatra Technologies began being used officially by 2004.

In May 2006, the company installed its inaugural "Anywhere Money" point of sale terminal in a bank in Ahmednagar as a proof of concept for the Government of Maharashtra. Then Union Minister of Agriculture Sharad Pawar inaugurated the project. The company's terminals received praise from politicians Shankarrao Gadakh and Hasan Mushrif, with them encouraging local schools, farmers, artisans, and traders to make use of the system. The Bharat Sanchar Nigam Limited, as well as sugarcane factories in the Parner taluka and those of the Brihan Maharashtra Sugar Syndicate implemented use of the terminals for their clients.

In 2007, Agashe, then serving as Sarvatra Technologies's managing director, had merged the company's operations with EBZ Online and Codito, while partnering with Larry Ellison and the Oracle Corporation to introduce banking software technology to rural India, having previously gained I-flex Solutions founder Deepak Ghaisas as a director on Sarvatra Technologies's board of directors in 2002.

By January 2008, in a report filed by C. Rangarajan, the Reserve Bank of India's governor at the time, Y. V. Reddy and economist Raghuram Rajan, approved plans for the company to install their terminals in banks nationwide, becoming the sponsor model used by the National Payments Corporation of India for the National Financial Switch. The terminal was acclaimed by the National Bank for Agriculture and Rural Development and the Deutsche Gesellschaft für Internationale Zusammenarbeit for being a low cost solution for core banking services.

=== 2010s ===
In 2010, the company became the first application service provider to connect directly to the National Financial Switch. In July 2011, MLA Sudhakar Paricharak inaugurated the company's first instalment of its point of sale ATMs at a local bank in Pandharpur. By 2014, the company provided core banking services to 104 rural banks in India, and further launched credit and debit cards in partnership with RuPay that same year. Between 2016 and 2018, the company had aided 450 rural cooperative banks across 26 Indian states and union territories to connect to the National Financial Switch.

By 2018, the company had a gross transaction value of ₹400 billion, and had the Enam Group, ICICI Bank, Indian Overseas Bank, and the Oracle Corporation as key shareholders. It also provided banking software to HDFC Bank, ICICI Bank, Axis Bank, and Yes Bank, and through ICICI Bank, to Google and WhatsApp. The company further managed 50% and 30% of the total transaction volume generated on the Unified Payments Interface (UPI) and the Immediate Payment Service (IMPS) platforms respectively. That same year, the company's electronic funds transfer (EFT) switch was the recipient of a BFSI Innovation Tribe Award from The Economic Times.

In 2019, the switch further received a Best Banking Technology Award from the Internet and Mobile Association of India, while the company was reported to have a 55% market share in providing banking software to banks in India. The company also issued cards under the Kisan Credit Card scheme. Around this time, it was reported that the company sought funding in private equity for its micro ATMs.

=== 2020s ===
In March 2020, the company employed a work from home model in response to the COVID-19 pandemic, with Agashe announcing his plans to continue with the model after the pandemic. In April that same year, the company reported a three-fold rise in Aadhaar-enabled cash withdrawal in rural areas amid the COVID-19 lockdown in India across its UPI, IMPS, ATM, and PoS modes. Around this time, the company also established a network of micro ATMs and ATM vans to populations affected by the pandemic in rural India. The company also provided banking support to IDBI Bank, Punjab National Bank, Bank of Maharashtra, Paytm Payments Bank, Equitas Small Finance Bank, and Jana Small Finance Bank, and further had Google Pay as a client.

In November 2020, it was reported that the company had established a sponsorship model with the Central Bank of India that would aid the company to build a digital payment infrastructure for small rural banks and credit unions towards India's under-banked rural population as per World Bank estimates. By December of that year, the company had connected 50 urban cooperative banks to its UPI platform. Between 2021 and 2024, the company's reports on the adoption of digital payment solutions in India since the COVID-19 pandemic were cited by various academic sources.

In 2023, the company announced its collaboration with ICICI Bank, IDFC First Bank and Pine Labs to provide payments support to foreign travellers to the 2023 G20 New Delhi summit by issuing UPI enabled mobile payment wallets at Indira Gandhi International Airport in New Delhi, Chhatrapati Shivaji Maharaj International Airport in Mumbai, and Kempegowda International Airport in Bangalore. In March 2023, an Institute of Electrical and Electronics Engineers conference paper presented in Erode used the company's requests for proposals in its study of natural language processing. By 2024, the company's PaaS product was installed in 600 banks across India. In February 2024, the company announced a rewards program app with British company Enigmatic Smile, with MS Dhoni as their brand ambassador.

By 2025, the company's revenue was reported to be US$19.6 million, and was credited for contributing to Pune's reputation as an information technology hub in India. In November that same year, the company co-hosted an event with the FLO, the women's division of the Federation of Indian Chambers of Commerce & Industry, in digital and financial literacy for women in technology. By 2026, various local Indian banks were using the company's platform to provide mobile banking services such as UPI, avoiding the need for expensive government regulatory approvals to implement the technology. In April 2026, the company was the recipient of a Gold Stevie Award for innovation in fintech at the 13th Annual Asia-Pacific Stevie Awards held in Macau.

== Products and services ==
=== Sarvatra EFT Switch ===
In 2010, the company's ISO 8583 standard electronic funds transfer (EFT) switch, Sarvatra EFT Switch, became the first EFT switch from an application service provider to be granted permission from the National Payments Corporation of India to join the National Financial Switch. Prior to this, most cooperative banks in India did not have the infrastructure or financing to provide real-time gross settlement within the payment and settlement systems in India. This allowed the company to integrate rural and urban co-operative banks across India to secure Payment Card Industry Data Security Standard ISO/IEC 27001 standard infrastructure. The Sarvatra EFT Switch was thus offered to banks as a Platform as a Service (PaaS) product on the RuPay, Bharat Bill Pay, and Kisan Credit Card network.

By 2020, the switch had become a plug and play service offered to banks. During the COVID-19 pandemic, the switch's use in Sarvatra Technologies' micro ATMs and ATM vans aided the company's client banks to provide doorstep cash delivery services to under-banked rural areas of India that were cash-dominant economies.

=== Sarvatra Rewards App ===
In February 2024, the company launched the Sarvatra Rewards App, a payment system linked loyalty rewards program app, for the customers of its banks across 27 Indian states and 3 union territories through the company's Unified Payments Interface and RuPay credit and debit card network. The app was developed in partnership with Enigmatic Smile, a United Kingdom based Payment Card Industry Data Security Standard certified financial services organization, through their end user consolidating product Single.id. At an event in Mumbai, former captain of the Indian national cricket team, M. S. Dhoni, was announced as the app's brand ambassador.

== Funding ==
The company had reportedly raised US$19 million in total funding over six funding rounds, as of September 2021. Razorpay, Pine Labs, Stripe, and BillDesk were listed as its competitors. The company had reportedly raised US$25.4 million by 2025.

Funding history
Date	Funding type	Money raised	Lead investor	Valuation
7 September 2011	Series A	—	ICICI Bank	—
28 June 2014	Series A	US$3.18M	Vallabh Bhanshali	—
2 September 2016	Series A	US$1.54M	Brihans Natural Products	—
22 September 2021	Angel investment	US$2.71M	Vallabh Bhanshali	US$22.6M

== See also ==
- Banking in India
- Banking software
- Financial technology in India
- Payment gateway
- Payment service provider

== Bibliography ==
- Changder, Narayan (10 January 2023). Current Affairs 2018: The Amazing Quiz Book. Current Affairs. Vol. 1. Changder Outline – via Google Books.
- Company News and Notes. Vol. 37. Ministry of Commerce & Industry. July 2000. ISSN 0010-4027. LCCN sa64002695. OCLC 1564543 – via University of California, Berkeley.
- P., Sagarika (20 May 2026). All Articles/Topics of Economy Current Affairs 2023-25: Banking. 2Year. Vol. 1. Gurgaon: Victory IAS Academy. ASIN B0H2TT2QG2 – via Google Books.
- Shete, Madhuri; Oberoi, Supreet; Jain, Shravasti; Sayyed, Akhtar Ali, eds. (May 2025). Shaping the Future: Emerging Trends in Global Business Management (First ed.). New Delhi: Journal Press India. doi:10.17492/JPI/RIIM/103. ISBN 978-81-981704-6-0. Archived from the original on 20 January 2026 – via Google Scholar.

=== Academic articles ===
- Chawla, Preeti; Dalal, Supriya; Saxena, Ashima (31 December 2022). Kesharwani, Subodh (ed.). "Mobile Wallet Integration: A Wellspring of Prospects and Hardships" (PDF). Global Journal of Enterprise Information System. 14 (4). New Delhi: Scholastic Seed Inc.: 26–36. ISSN 0975-1432. OCLC 988732114. Archived from the original (PDF) on 12 July 2026 – via ResearchGate.
- Jain, Anil; Sarupria, Apurva; Kothari, Ankita (June 2020). "The Impact of COVID-19 on E-wallet's Payments in Indian Economy" (PDF). International Journal of Creative Research Thoughts (in English and Hindi). 8 (6). Udaipur: Pacific University; Indian Institute of Management Udaipur: 2447–2454. ISSN 2320-2882. Archived from the original (PDF) on 10 July 2026 – via ResearchGate.
- Jaswani, Dugesh; Kalla, Nitin (2024). "The Impact of COVID-19 on the Adoption of Digital Payments: A Study on Awareness, Perception, and Behaviour of the General Public" (PDF). International Journal of Food Sciences and Nutrition. 13 (2). Raipur: MATS University: 138–159. ISSN 2319-1775. Archived from the original (PDF) on 12 July 2026 – via ResearchGate.
- Mate, Rashmi; Kapdi, Atul (2021). "Impact of COVID-19 on Digital Payments Usage in India" (PDF). Anvesak. 51 (2). Ahmedabad: Sardar Patel Institute of Economic and Social Research: 78–87. ISSN 0378-4568. Archived from the original (PDF) on 12 July 2026 – via ResearchGate.
- Patil, Krutika; Badamikar, Medha; Sonawane, Sheetal (25 April 2023). NLP based Text Summarization of Fintech RFPs. 2023 International Conference on Sustainable Computing and Data Communication Systems (ICSCDS). Erode: Institute of Electrical and Electronics Engineers. doi:10.1109/ICSCDS56580.2023.10104748. ISBN 978-1-6654-9200-3. Archived from the original on 25 April 2024 – via IEEE Xplore.
- Shanbag, Rishabh Ganesh (9 May 2025). Navigating Fintech Innovations: Strategic Insights from the United States and India (Master of Science in Management thesis). Cambridge, Massachusetts: MIT Sloan School of Management. hdl:1721.1/163292. Archived from the original on 10 July 2026 – via DSpace.

=== Business reports ===
- Barman, R. B.; Das, Ashish; Tacke, Markus; Srinivasan, N. (February 2011). "Assessment of the Payment System With respect to Inclusiveness towards Small Remittances" (PDF). NABARD GIZ Rural Financial Institutions Programmer. Mumbai, New Delhi: National Bank for Agriculture and Rural Development, Deutsche Gesellschaft für Internationale Zusammenarbeit. Archived from the original (Report) on 4 November 2022 – via Google Books.
