= Vallabh =

Vallabh may refer to:

== People ==
- Vallabh Bhanshali (born 1952), Indian investment
- Vallabh Bhatt, Gujarati poet
- Vallabh Dharaviya, Indian politician
- Vallabh Sambamurthy, American academic
- Janki Vallabh, Indian banker
- Hira Vallabh Tripathi (1902–1982), Indian politician

== Other uses ==
- Vallabh Vidyanagar, town
- Radha Vallabh Temple, Vrindavan, Hindu temple
- Shri Atma Vallabh Jain Smarak, Jain temple
- Prithvi Vallabh (disambiguation)
