= BANCS =

- Banks ATM Network and Customer Services (India)
- BANCS (Japan)
- TCS BaNCS
