= National Financial Switch =

Bank network in India

- Operating area: India
- Members: 101 Direct Members 776 Sub-Members; 56 RRBs 8 WLAOs
- ATMs: 237000
- Founded: 27 August 2004
- Owner: NPCI

National Financial Switch (NFS) is the largest network of shared automated teller machines (ATMs) in India. It was designed, developed and deployed by the Institute for Development and Research in Banking Technology (IDRBT) in 2004, with the goal of inter-connecting the ATMs in the country and facilitating convenience banking. It is run by the National Payments Corporation of India (NPCI). As on 31 January 2022, there were 1,203 members that includes 111 Direct, 1,045 Sub members, 43 RRBs and 4 WLAOs using NFS network connected to more than 2.55 Lac ATM (including cash deposit machines/recyclers).

== Background ==
The first ATM in India was set up in 1987 by HSBC in Mumbai. In the following ten years, about 1500 ATMs were set up in India. In 1997, the Indian Banks' Association (IBA) set up Swadhan, the first network of shared ATMs in India. It was managed by India Switch Company (ISC) for five years, and allowed cardholders to withdraw cash from any ATM in the network, for a fee if they did not have an account with the bank that owned the ATM. In 2002, the network connected over 1000 ATMs of the 53 member banks of the association. The network was capable of handling 250,000 transactions per day, but only 5000 transactions, worth about ₹100,000, took place each day. In contrast, ICICI Bank's network of about 640 ATMs handled transactions worth about ₹20,000,000 each day. After the contract with ISC expired, IBA failed to find a bidder to manage the operationally uneconomical network, and shut it down on 31 December 2003.

After the collapse of Swadhan, Bank of India, Union Bank of India, Indian Bank, United Bank of India and Syndicate Bank formed an ATM-sharing network called CashTree. Citibank, the Industrial Development Bank of India, Standard Chartered Bank and Axis Bank formed a similar network called Cashnet. Punjab National Bank and Canara Bank also created such networks.

In August 2003, the IDRBT announced that it would be creating the National Financial Switch (NFS) to link together the country's ATMs in a single network.

The IDRBT collaborated with Euronet Worldwide and Opus Software to build a platform to allow banks to connect their own switches to the NFS. The NFS consisted of an inter-ATM switch and a e-commerce payment gateway.

== History ==
The National Financial Switch was launched by the IDRBT on 27 August 2004, connecting the ATMs of three banks, Corporation Bank, Bank of Baroda and ICICI Bank. The IDRBT then worked towards bringing all major banks in India on board and by December 2009, the network had grown to connect 49,880 ATMs of 37 banks, thereby emerging as the largest network of shared ATMs in the country.

IDRBT decided to hive off its operational role on ATM switching to refocus on research and development, and was sought to shift the business to a national-level payment system organization. The National Payments Corporation of India (NPCI) started discussions with IDRBT on the feasibility of taking over. The Board for Regulation and Supervision of Payment and Settlement Systems (BPSS) at its meeting held on 24 September 2009 approved in-principle to issue authorisation to NPCI for operating various retail payment systems in the country. The Reserve Bank of India granted authorisation to NPCI to take over the operations of National Financial Switch (NFS) from the Institute of Development and Research in Banking Technology (IDRBT) on a ‘as is where is basis’ on 15 October 2009. NPCI deputed its officials to IDRBT Hyderabad, and the Institute handed over the National Financial Switch to the NPCI on 14 December 2009.

Any bank that provides core banking services with 24x7 transaction banking capabilities with or without ATMs may join the National Financial Switch through a sponsor bank. This allows non-scheduled Urban Co-operative Banks (UCBs) and Regional Rural Banks (RRBs) to gain access to the national network of over 103,000 ATMs in the country. Before 14 August 2011, access was limited to scheduled banks with RTGS membership. The sponsorship scheme was started to increase the connectivity of ATMs across the country, and to enable customers to use ATMs across India.

The primary headquarters is located at Mumbai.

== Member banks ==
As of April 2017, the NFS Network connects total of 2,36,199 ATMs in India. Among them 2,16,952 ATMs of 99 Direct Member banks, 4,058 ATMs of 692 Sub Member banks, 1,034 ATMs of 56 RRB Member banks and 14,146 ATMs of 8 White Label ATM providers, which is the largest number of ATMs under a single network in India.

== Services offered in NFS ==
NFS which is the largest domestic ATM network in the country member banks has been in the fore front in providing inter bank ATM services to maximum customers. Initially, the following basic transactions were available in the NFS network

- Cash Withdrawal
- Balance Enquiry
- PIN Change
- Mini Statement

To enable the member banks of NFS to offer greater utility to their customers, NPCI has introduced the below mentioned functionalities as value added services to enable customers to use these services at any participating bank ATMs.

Card to Card Fund transfer (ATM/Debit Card to ATM/Debit Card) : Using this service, a Card holder of a participating NFS Member Bank will be able to remit funds to another Card holder of a participating NFS Member Bank. The funds will be transferred basis the Beneficiary's ‘Card Number’ which the remitter will be required to input at the time of the transaction. The main features of the service are mentioned below:

- Inter Operable
- Instant Fund Transfer
- 24/7 Availability
- Paper Less
- Secure
- Better Fund Management
- Transaction Limits - The transaction limits are in accordance with the RBI's circular on ‘Domestic Money Transfer’. Accordingly, for cases where the Issuing and Beneficiary Cards are ‘Debit/ATM Cards’, the per transaction limit will be Rs.5000 and the monthly limit will be Rs.25,000 per remitter.

Cheque Book Request/Statement Request: At present, although statement & cheque book request options are available at ATMs, these are available only for customers of that particular bank. NFS aims to make this option inter operable wherein customers will be able to avail the aforementioned services at NFS member bank ATMs who avail this particular service from NPCI.
