= Credit Union South =

New Zealand-based credit union

- Company type: Nonprofit organization
- Industry: Financial services
- Founded: October 10, 1962; 63 years ago
- Defunct: 2019
- Fate: Merged
- Successor: Unity (credit union)
- Headquarters: Dunedin, New Zealand
- Key people: Tania Dickie (CEO); Janice Fredric (Chairman)
- Members: 19,000+ (2017)
- Number of employees: 90+ (2018)
- Website: www.nzcusouth.co.nz

Credit Union South, (trading as NZCU South), was a New Zealand not-for-profit credit union that operated nationwide offering banking and financial services to its members until it was merged in 2019 to form Unity Credit Union (New Zealand).

NZCU South was one of New Zealand's longest running credit unions with its origins dating back to 1962 from St Mary's Catholic Parish in Nelson. The legal entity of NZCU South was created in 2008 through the merger of numerous smaller credit unions in the Otago, Southland, Nelson, West Coast and Canterbury regions. NZCU South was a New Zealand owned cooperative and operated independently under the NZCU brand and by 2019 had over 19,000 members Before the merger it had 91 employees with four branches, as well as in their support office in Dunedin.

In March 2019, the members of Credit Union South approved a transfer of engagements of Credit Union South to Credit Union Baywide. Credit Union Baywide accepted this transfer of engagements on 15 March 2019 from Credit union South and other participating New Zealand credit unions. This including NZCU South as well as Auckland Credit Union and NZCU Central. The new credit unions was renamed in 2021 as Unity Credit Union (New Zealand) trading as Unity.

== History ==
=== Establishment ===
Established by the parishioners of St Mary's Catholic Parish in Nelson, 10 October 1962, the New Zealand credit union movement swept the nation causing credit unions to pop up all around the country.

Colin Smith, a Hamilton chartered accountant, set about organising the New Zealand credit union league and in 1964. The league was established with nine member credit unions.

The credit union league traveled all over the country and spoke of the importance of the credit union movement. By the early 1980s New Zealand had several hundred credit unions. This led to government intervention as regulations were then set in place to enforce increase capital reserves and liquidity levels. Meaning smaller credit unions were unable to compete, causing them to merge with larger credit unions.

=== NZCU South formation ===
Credit Union Otago was formed in 1987 by the merger of five Otago based credit unions (CU); Fire services CU, Hospitals CU, Railways CU, Fletchers Hospital CU and Waterfront CU.

CU Otago sustained continued growth over its 20 years and in 2007, CU Otago merged with five more Dunedin based credit unions to become Credit Union Mainland.

CU Mainland grew quick and in 2008, further merged with credit unions operating in Southland, Westcoast, Canterbury and Nelson to form one major credit union for the South Island. It was during this merger that CU Mainland changed its legal name to Credit Union South and rebranded to NZCU South.

=== Banking system update ===
On 2 April 2018, NZCU South went live with their new banking system, Oracle Flexcube. The banking system they were using before this was FACTS, which they adopted back in 1987 while under the name of CU Otago.

=== Transfer of engagements ===
On 13 March 2019, the members of Credit Union South voted in favour and passed a special resolution, approving a transfer of engagements of Credit Union South to Credit Union Baywide. This transfer of engagements was part of a proposed multi-party credit union merger between Credit Union South and four other participating New Zealand credit unions; Aotearoa Credit Union, Credit Union Central, Credit Union Baywide and Credit Union Steelsands.

On 14 March 2019, Credit Union Steelsands members voted not in favour of the proposed transfer of engagements and have therefore, not gone ahead with the proposed merger with the participating credit unions.

On 15 March 2019, the members and the board of directors of Credit Union Baywide, accepted the transfer of engagements from three out of the four participating credit unions, meaning that they will merge to become New Zealand's largest credit union. The intended transfer of engagements will take effect from 1 May 2019, once certain regulatory approvals and conditions are met.

== Core business activities ==
The credit union offered transactional banking services such as transaction accounts, savings accounts, debit and credit cards, insurance, personal loans, mortgages and investment services such as term deposit. As well as the Fisher Funds KiwiSaver scheme.

== Corporate social responsibility ==
NZCU South was a premier sponsor of Sydenham Rugby club located in Christchurch. NZCU South offered a scholarship programme for young members.
