= RuPay =

Indian multinational card payment service

- Product type: Credit card; Debit card; Contactless smart card; Stored-value card; Digital card; BharatQR
- Current owner: National Payments Corporation of India
- Country: India
- Introduced: 26 March 2012; 14 years ago
- Tagline: ONE LIFE. ONE RuPay.
- Website: rupay.co.in

RuPay (portmanteau of Rupee and Payment) is an Indian multinational financial services and payment service system, conceived and owned by the National Payments Corporation of India (NPCI). It was launched in 2012, to fulfil the Reserve Bank of India's (RBI) vision of establishing a domestic, open and multilateral system of payments. RuPay facilitates electronic payments at almost all Indian banks and financial institutions. NPCI has partnered with Discover Financial and JCB to help the RuPay network gain international acceptance.

As of November 2020, around 753 million RuPay cards have been issued by nearly 1,158 banks. All merchant discount rate (MDR) charges were eliminated for transactions done using Rupay debit cards from 1 January 2020. All Indian companies with an annual turnover exceeding ₹50 crore (US$5.3 million) are required to offer RuPay debit card and Unified Payments Interface as a payment option to their customers.

== Background ==
In 2009, RBI asked the Indian Banks' Association to create a non-profit payment company which would design an indigenous payment card. The card was tentatively called "India Pay". After years of planning, NPCI was entrusted with its implementation and finalised the name of the proposed card as RuPay, a portmanteau of the words rupee and payment to avoid naming conflicts with other financial institutions using the same name. The colours used in the logo allude to the tricolour flag of India. NPCI conceived RuPay as an alternative to Mastercard and Visa, while consolidating and integrating various payment systems in India.

RBI, in a Vision Document titled "Payment Systems in India - Vision 2009-12", had previously expressed the need for an Indian payments system. It arose from the absence of a domestic price setter, which caused Indian banks to bear high costs for affiliation and connection with international payment systems like Visa and Mastercard. Partnerships with these foreign companies meant that all transactions, of which domestic payments accounted for more than 90%, needed to be routed through a switch located outside the country.

RuPay was launched in and dedicated to India on 8 May 2014, by the then President of India, Pranab Mukherjee, at Rashtrapati Bhavan. NPCI launched a subsidiary called NPCI International Payments Limited (NIPL) on 19 August 2020 to increase the globalisation and availability of RuPay in foreign markets. As of March 2021, the market share of RuPay in India was at 34% by volume of transactions and at 30% by value.

On 14 December 2021, the Government of India approved a ₹1,300 crore ($170 million) package to promote RuPay among marginalised sections of the population.

Mastercard and Visa have raised concerns with the Office of the United States Trade Representative (USTR) over India promoting the use of RuPay.

=== Internationalisation ===
Around 77.7 crore (777 million) Indian consumers shopped cross-border in 2021. To make payments easier, NPCI International Payments Limited (NIPL) signed a memorandum of understanding (MoU) with UK-based PPRO Financial on 17 November 2021 to expand the acceptance of RuPay in foreign markets, especially in China and United States, which account for half of all international transactions coming from India.

Under its Payments Vision 2025, RBI aimed to further push for the internationalization of RuPay, with countries using the United States dollar, Pound sterling and Euro under bilateral treaties.

NIPL signed a definitive agreement with PPRO Financial on 27 April 2023 that will enable acceptance of UPI among international payment service providers (PSPs) and global merchant acquirers.

== Products ==
RuPay offers debit cards, credit cards, prepaid cards and government scheme cards. Government scheme cards include debit and credit cards, such as the RuPay PMJDY, RuPay Mudra and RuPay PunGrain debit cards, and the RuPay Kisan credit card. It also offers combo cards that offer debit and credit, debit and prepaid, or credit and prepaid features through a single card.

=== Debit cards ===
RuPay issues debit cards in three variants – Classic, Platinum and Select. Classic is the standard variant, and a basic RuPay-branded card which offers minimum features such as acceptance at almost all merchants in India, and some offers in categories like dining, travel, pharmacy, lifestyle, cosmetics, retails, shopping, and jewelry. It does not offer benefits such as airport lounge access. Platinum is RuPay's middle tier offering, providing all the features of Classic, plus more offers and benefits such as airport lounge access, comprehensive insurance coverage of up to ₹2,00,000 and various other merchant offers.

In 2020, NPCI launched the RuPay Select card, in a bid to target more affluent customers. It is the most premium variant of a card issued by RuPay. The card is independent of its issuing bank, forming partnerships with various businesses to provide card-specific benefits. Under Rupay Select, all benefits are curated under one package, independent of bank partnerships, saving customers the hassle of applying for multiple card schemes. RuPay Select allows NPCI to capture a share of the high-spending customer market and provide an Indian alternative against premium offerings from Mastercard, Visa etc.

As of July 2018, RuPay cards have been issued by most banks across India. Apart from the main private-sector and public-sector banks, RuPay cards are also issued by cooperative banks (scheduled cooperative banks, district cooperative banks, state cooperative banks, urban cooperative banks) and regional rural banks (RRBs) in the country.

=== Credit cards ===
Similar to RuPay debit cards, RuPay credit cards are available in three variants – RuPay Classic, RuPay Platinum and RuPay Select. RuPay credit cards have been in operation since June 2017, with eight public sector banks, one private sector bank and one cooperative bank issuing the card without any formal launch. A pilot project was implemented to technically enable more banks in RuPay credit cards with an additional five public sector banks. By March 2018, NPCI plans to have 25 banks altogether on board.

More than 18 banks have launched RuPay credit cards:

- Axis Bank
- AU Small Finance Bank
- HDFC Bank
- IDBI Bank
- United Bank of India
- Union Bank of India
- Punjab National Bank
- Punjab and Maharashtra Co-operative Bank
- Saraswat Bank
- Canara Bank
- Central Bank of India
- Vijaya Bank
- Bank of India
- Federal Bank
- Kotak Mahindra Bank
- Bank of Baroda
- Yes Bank
- State Bank of India

After a moratorium imposed by RBI on Mastercard due to data localization issues, Federal Bank and Yes Bank started on-boarding new credit card customers on RuPay platform. In 2021, Fiserve with NPCI launched a stack of services called nFiNi, that will help Indian banks improve the quality of services for RuPay credit cards. In September 2021, Union Bank of India (UBI) launched a RuPay and JCB co-branded international credit card.

NPCI, in collaboration with Kotak Mahindra Bank, launched specially designed RuPay credit cards for the Indian Armed Forces on 28 October 2021. BOB Financial and NPCI partnered to launch Bank of Baroda RuPay and JCB co-branded international credit card on 16 November 2021. Launched on the RuPay-JCB international network, it supports better global acceptance. During the 2021 Digital Payment Utsav, India Post Payments Bank, Punjab National Bank, Kotak Mahindra Bank, YES Bank, Indian Overseas Bank, ICICI Bank, Indian Bank, Bank of Maharashtra, and City Union Bank launched contactless credit cards on the RuPay network.

From 8 June 2022, RBI allowed the linking of RuPay credit cards with India's Unified Payments Interface (UPI). In the absence of a physical card, customers can use their credit limit through for transactions. The service was officially launched on 20 September 2022, and was a game changer, helping Rupay increase their market share. For the first time, RuPay credit card usage topped ₹10,000 crore in a single month in December 2023, accounting for roughly 6% of the domestic credit card market. The number of RuPay credit cards in use surpassed 10 million in December 2023.

On 1 August 2024, RBL Bank announced integration of National Common Mobility Card and UPI capabilities with RuPay credit cards.

==== Combo cards ====
The Union Bank of India launched the RuPay Combo Debit Cum Credit Card in November 2018, the first RuPay card that facilitates both debit and credit transactions through a single card. The card has 2 EMVs and 2 magnetic stripes.

=== Prepaid cards ===
RuPay issues prepaid cards in three variants – RuPay Classic, RuPay Corporate and RuPay Platinum.

Sodexo launched the Sodexo Multi-Benefit Pass in partnership with RuPay in May 2019. The card contains a magnetic stripe that allows users to pay for meal benefits, as well as a chip that allows them make purchases through the RuPay network. It can also be used to make online purchases on web portals that accept RuPay payments.

Indian Railway Catering and Tourism Corporation (IRCTC) in collaboration with the Union Bank of India and the National Payment Corporation of India launched the IRCTC-UBI RuPay pre-paid card in 2015 to book tickets, do shopping and pay service bills. The card is the first of its kind in the market, as both virtual and physical cards are issued to customers in two variants.

Kochi1, a RuPay prepaid smart card rolled out by Kochi Metro Rail Ltd (KMRL) with the help of the Axis Bank on 2 March 2019, became the first inter-modal transit card when its usage was extended to private buses with additional services including parking solutions in near future. It was launched under the Kochi Smart City project, with plans to extend the card to auto-rickshaws, ferries including those of the Kerala State Water Transport Department, the proposed Water Metro, and KSRTC buses so as to make it a Common Mobility Card in all respects.

RBL Bank partnered with GI Technology, a Wirecard subsidiary and India's largest wallet-based domestic money remittance company operating under the brand name ICashCard to launch RBL-ICASH co-branded, open loop RuPay Prepaid Card.

ItzCash, India's largest digital payments company, announced that it has partnered with RBL Bank to launch the country's first co-branded Rupay Platinum Prepaid Card. The multi-purpose card will roll out a suite of prepaid services across physical and virtual platforms. The service was launched to ensure seamless interoperability, access to unlocking multiple solutions and driving the prepaid program of the nation.

MobiKwik launched a RuPay Prepaid card in collaboration with NPCI and Axis Bank on 12 November 2021.

=== RuPay Global ===
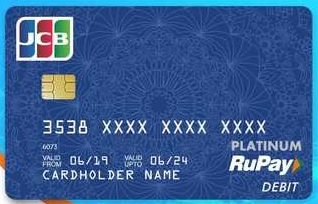
RuPay-JCB Global Card

The NPCI started issuing global cards in 2014. Singapore has since offered assistance to promote India's digital payment network RuPay card overseas by becoming its first international partner. On 7 March 2012, NPCI entered into a strategic partnership with Discover Financial for RuPay, enabling RuPay Global Cards to utilise Discover Card, Diners Club International and PULSE networks for international purchases and cash access outside of India. Both companies also worked to implement D-PAS, Discover's EMV technology to offer chip-based cards to RuPay card members. The cards are now accepted by over 42.4 million POS terminals and 1.90 million ATMs in 185 countries.

NPCI, with JCB launched the RuPay-JCB Global card on 22 July 2019. After extending domestic POS terminal and ATM support for incoming foreign JCB card holders in 2017, NPCI entered into the second phase of its partnership with the launch of the co-branded card to further increase the international acceptance of RuPay. The card will offer special cashback programmes for POS transactions outside India, in addition to selected popular international destinations for travellers. It will support additional services such as in-city JCB Lounges located in airports with round the year merchant promotions all over the world. While debit cards are only being issued initially through the partnership, credit and prepaid cards are also on the anvil.

RuPay issued 64 million Global Cards between 2014 and March 2019. RuPay has tied up with international players like Discover, Japan Credit Bureau and China Union Pay to enhance its international acceptance and recently achieved the milestone of issuing 25 million RuPay – Discover global cards. As per JCB Co., Ltd., 1 million RuPay-JCB co-badged cards are in circulation in India in premium category.

RuPay has several agreements with other international payment networks. Some major examples include:

- Discover Card
- Diners Club International
- Pulse in United States
- JCB in Japan
- NETS in Singapore
- UnionPay in China
- BC Card in South Korea
- Elo in Brazil
- DinaCard in Serbia

=== RuPay for Business ===
==== RuPay E-com ====
RuPay E-com is the payment gateway that facilitates online transactions by RuPay card holders. It supports one click payments, Seamless APIs, and Connected Checkout, and also offers additional payment options such as subscription payments, EMI, online credit card bill payments and balance transfers.

==== Commercial credit card ====
NPCI launched the RuPay Commercial Credit Card for corporate clients on 23 July 2020 at Global Fintech Fest in partnership with State Bank of Mauritius (SBM). Fintech startup Yap helped in developing the application programming interface (API) powering the card while EnKash will provide dedicated customer support and expense management service. SBM is targeting the product towards SMEs and MSMEs. It will be available through State Bank of Mauritius touch-points across India which is undergoing business expansion. RuPay Business credit card is offering instant bulk payout, 30-day credit period on business purchase, automated goods and services tax (GST) and a dashboard to manage business spending that will further help the clients move towards more powerful corporate offerings from NPCI in future.

Central Bank of India with NPCI launched RuPay Business Platinum on 29 December 2021 for corporate customers. The card will help people from small business and micro-enterprise to maintain personal and business account separately.

==== RuPay Pro ====
RuPay Pro credit card is also launched on 23 July 2020 at Global Fintech Fest but is mainly oriented towards young individual entrepreneurs. It is offering variable billing cycle, travel expenses, rental payments with dedicated customer services and expense tracking mechanism. It supports digital and paperless know your customer (KYC) process on-boarding.

==== nth Rewards ====
nth Rewards is a loyalty benefits platform operated by the NPCI that enables corporate clients to sponsor rewards for RuPay card holders.

== Technology ==
=== RuPay Contactless ===
Old Symbol

New Symbol

RuPay Contactless is a contactless payment technology feature that allows cardholders to wave their card in front of contactless payment terminals without the need to physically swipe or insert the card into a point-of-sale device. This is an EMV-compatible, contactless payment feature similar to Mastercard Contactless, Visa Contactless, and ExpressPay which use RFID technology.

The National Payments Corporation of India's (NPCI) card network RuPay has launched a contactless prepaid NFC card. It launched the contactless card for the Ahmedabad Smart city project in association with ICICI Bank and Ahmedabad Municipal Corporation. It also launched similar prepaid contactless cards for the Kochi Metro Rail Ltd (KMRL) and Bangalore Metropolitan Transport Corporation (BMTC) in association with Axis Bank.

Contactless can currently be used on transactions up to and including ₹2000. In March 2019 under ‘One Nation, One Card’ scheme a National Common Mobility Card (NCMC) for transportation was launched by Prime Minister Narendra Modi at a function in Ahmedabad on RuPay platform in order to avoid vendor lock-in and create an interoperable system under Make in India.

This is the latest development in the forward movement of the Interoperable Fare Management System. The main aim behind the card is to redefine payment for public transport systems and retail ease of access, at the cutting edge of digital payments. The project is under the purview of the Ministry of Housing and Urban Affairs, with the vision "One Card for all payments". With this theme, the card needed to be accepted across multiple verticals. It then made sense to take up a card which is gaining a significant amount of adoption in the contactless payment space. The specifications for the NCMC programme are with the government and it is not owned by any specific body, hence all card payment schemes are welcome to join the programme.

Brihanmumbai Electricity Supply and Transport (BEST) buses are set to become the first public transportation in India to roll out the National Common Mobility Card (NCMC). The one nation, one card system will initially be implemented on a pilot basis from November 2019 and will be available widely only from 2020. More than 10,000 BEST conductors will be given the hand-held devices that would be able to scan the NCMC cards with just one tap, alongside generating paper tickets.

Visa is ready with the specifications to start issuing cards on the NCMC network and has started discussions with banks to issue their cards on NCMC. Just weeks after its competitor Visa, Mastercard was set to join One Nation One Card project.

After discussions with Bharat Electronics Limited (BEL) and Centre for Development of Advanced Computing (C-DAC), Bangalore Metro Rail Corporation Limited (BMRCL) confirmed the trial run from 1 January 2020 with four automatic fare collection (AFC) gates at Nadaprabhu, Kempegowda and Baiyyappanahalli stations. Passengers of Bangalore Metropolitan Transport Corporation (BMTC) buses and Metro trains on the Majestic-Whitefield route will be able to use the card. Existing AFC gates at Phase 1 metro stations will have to be upgraded while AFC gates at Phase 2 metro stations operational by 2024 will accept new cards. Around 11,000 old electronic ticketing machines will be replaced with new android-based ones of which around 2,000 have already been changed to accept the card.

The State Bank of India (SBI) in collaboration with Indian Railway Catering and Tourism Corporation (IRCTC) launched SBI-IRCTC RuPay contactless card on 28 July 2020 to reward frequent railway travellers in India with the proposal of maximum savings during the journey period. The card uses Near Field Communication (NFC) technology and can be used by the railway travellers for benefits on retail, dining and entertainment besides transaction fee waivers.

On 25 March 2023, NCMC was officially launched in Bengaluru. From 30 March 2023, RBL Bank and Namma Metro started issuing the cards.

==== RuPay On-the-Go ====
NPCI on the eve of Global Fintech Festival 2021 launched RuPay On-the-Go interoperable, open-loop contactless solution that are made available on smartwatch and other personal electronic accessories eliminating the need to carry physical card.

A partnership between NPCI and the TATA for 2024 Indian Premier League has been launched. A limited number of guests will be able to purchase a special wristband and other items for the playoffs and final. The special wristband will be from "RuPay On-The-Go" series. The gadget will serve as a contactless payment method after the cricketing event in addition to providing seamless access control during the event.

At the Global Fintech Fest 2024, Airtel Payments Bank, in collaboration with Noise and the National Payments Corporation of India (NPCI), launched a smartwatch that incorporates RuPay chip embedded in the dial, enabling direct payments. Tap-and-pay transactions are made easier by the smartwatch's support for National Common Mobility Card (NCMC) technology. Users can pay at a variety of retail sites and public transportation hubs, including as bus stops, metro stations, and parking lots. Users may choose between contactless purchases and monthly passes on the device, as well as handle transportation concessions. A PIN is required to conduct transactions over ₹5,000, whereas transactions under this amount can be performed without one.

=== NPCI Tokenisation System ===
In view of RBI guidelines on card payment, NPCI on 21 October 2021 launched Token Reference On File (TROF) service that will help keep RuPay card details into RuPay Network Secure Vault. This will help share unique token reference ID number instead of actual card details between customers, merchants and banks for transactions and stop identity theft and hacks.

On 6 December 2021, PayPhi became the first digital payment platform in the country to officially certified for RuPay Tokenisation System.

=== BharatQR ===
BharatQR Symbol

This is developed by NPCI in collaboration with Mastercard, and Visa as an integrated interoperable QR code based payment system and was launched in September 2016. It facilitates users to transfer their money from one source to another without the need of physical cards. The money transferred through BharatQR is received directly in the user's linked bank account using IMPS. It provides a common interface between RuPay, Mastercard, Visa, American Express as opposed to other such individual proprietary systems. BharatQR is supported on both Android and iOS devices. Bijlipay, an end to end digital payment solutions company, is the first Indian Point-of-Sale (PoS) devices providing company to enable Bharat QR code on the screens of its POS machines. According to RBI, the Bharat QR Code is the world's first inter-operable payment acceptance solution.

==== Recurring Payment ====
RuPay Card is expected to roll out recurring payments without the two-factor authentication process for transactions of less than ₹2,000 during first quarter of 2020, as per National Payments Corporation of India (NPCI) chief operating officer (COO) Praveena Rai. The technology work is going on and the entire ecosystem is gearing up for the shift.

== Acceptance ==
=== India ===
RuPay cards are accepted at almost all ATMs across India. On 21 June 2013, NPCI launched RuPay PaySecure that enabled card holders make online payment. Till November 2020, over 1,158 banks issued 603.6 million RuPay cards.

PayPal supports the RuPay card system. Amazon accepts all RuPay debit cards, and some RuPay credit cards issued by select banks. Apple began accepting RuPay debit and credit cards on the App Store and iTunes Store in July 2021. RuPay cards are accepted as a valid payment method on Google Play for making one-time purchases in apps and games. Recurring payments, aka E-Mandates via RuPay cards aren't yet supported on Google Play.

=== International ===
==== Singapore ====
The Prime Minister of India, Narendra Modi, launched the RuPay scheme in Singapore on 31 May 2018. The launch took place in parallel with related services offered by the NPCI, such as UPI and BHIM. The State Bank of India, Singapore will be the first bank to issue RuPay cards in the country.

RuPay users will be able to make payments at NETS terminals across Singapore. NETS users will be able to make online purchases on e-commerce merchant websites in India using 2.8 million RuPay PoS terminals. The rollout was expected mid-2018.

==== Bhutan ====
Following Bhutanese Prime Minister Lotay Tshering's visit to India on 28 December 2018, Indian Prime Minister Narendra Modi announced that RuPay cards would be introduced in Bhutan. RuPay cards were officially launched in Bhutan on 17 August 2019 with Prime Minister Modi making the first RuPay transaction in the country with a purchase from Simtokha Dzong.

Reserve Bank of India (RBI) and Royal Monetary Authority of Bhutan (RMA) announced that they would integrate the financial switches of the two countries in order to simplify cross border transactions. India will support an estimated ₹27 million (US$290,000) cost of the integration work. Post-integration, RuPay card holders can use their cards across all ATMs and POS terminals in Bhutan. The RMA maintains an account with the State Bank of India. Any withdrawal by a RuPay card holder in Bhutan would be settled through an instant credit into the RMA's account. The arrangement is expected to benefit both countries by minimising foreign currency outflow. Visa and MasterCard payments are settled in US dollars, while RuPay can be settled in rupees. The Bhutanese Ngultrum is fixed at a one-to-one exchange rate with the Indian rupee making settlement easy for both countries. In addition, Bhutanese banks will issue RuPay cards that will allow Bhutanese card holders to access the RuPay network in India.

On 20 November 2020, Prime Minister Narendra Modi and Prime Minister of Bhutan, Dr. Lotay Tshering jointly launched Phase-2 of RuPay Bhutan in which Bhutan National Bank will now issue RuPay-based cards allowing Bhutanese RuPay card holders to use them within Bhutan and in India.

==== Maldives ====
Prime Minister Narendra Modi announced that RuPay cards would be launched in the Maldives during his address to the People's Majlis (the Maldivan Parliament) on 8 June 2019. Modi added that the introduction of RuPay would increase the number of Indian tourists visiting the Maldives.

On 4 December 2019, Bank of Maldives (BML) partnered with National Payment Corporation of India (NPCI) to introduce RuPay Cards in Maldives. BML and NPCI signed a MoU to introduce the acceptance of RuPay cards in Maldives. BML will accept RuPay cards on the bank's ATMs, POS machine and other digital channels. BML revealed that the issuance of RuPay co-branded prepaid cards by the bank, and the acceptance of the co-branded cards across ATMs, POS machines and digital channels in India will also take place in due time.

==== UAE ====
A Memorandum of Understanding (MoU) to establish a technology interface between the payment platforms in India and UAE was exchanged between the National Payments Corporation of India and UAE's Mercury Payments Services. UAE is the first country in the Gulf where RuPay was launched. In Abu Dhabi on 3 October 2023, NIPL and Al Etihad Payments signed a MoU to facilitate cross-border transactions and establish a domestic card program for the UAE based on the RuPay debit and credit card stack. Union Minister Piyush Goyal from Ministry of Commerce and Industry of India announced at the 2024 Vibrant Gujarat Global Summit, that India and UAE are prepared to promote RuPay and ease direct trade between the Indian rupee and the UAE dirham. UPI Payments are now available at all of LuLu's UAE locations. All Indian visitors have to do is scan their UPI QR code using the point-of-sale terminals at LuLu stores. For this, they can pay for items in the UAE with the RuPay card or their UPI-enabled apps using their Indian phone number. The money connected to their Indian bank accounts is used to make the payment.

==== Bahrain ====
An MoU on 25 August 2019 was signed between The Benefit Company for handling ATM and POS transactions among others, and National Payments Corporation of India (NPCI) for launch of RuPay card in the Gulf Kingdom. As of 2021, BENEFIT is enabling its member acquirers of 515 ATMs and 40,000 PoS terminals in Bahrain to accept and recognize Issuer Identification Numbers (IIN) from NPCI International Payment Limited (NIPL).

==== Saudi Arabia ====
Indian Ministry of External Affairs (MEA) announced on 24 October 2019 that to help domestic pilgrims visiting Mecca and Madina, Prime Minister Narendra Modi will launch RuPay card in Saudi Arabia during a state visit to the gulf country on 29 October 2019. During a meeting with Majid bin Abdullah Al Qasabi on 19 September 2022, Commerce and Industry Minister Piyush Goyal discussed introduction of RuPay in the country. Operationalization of RuPay is one of the priority area in bilateral digital Fintech collaboration.

==== Myanmar (Burma) ====
Myanmar has decided to work together with India on the launch of RuPay enabled cards at the earliest and explore the creation of a digital payment gateway, according to a joint statement issued by the President of Myanmar, Win Myint on 28 February 2020. NPCI needs to adhere to Myanmar financial regulation and laws which would not only stimulate the economy of Myanmar but further facilitate cross border tourism and business from India.

==== South Korea ====
BC Card announced on 23 August 2017 that it has signed a bilateral memorandum of understanding (MoU) for strategic network partnership with National Payments Corporation of India (NPCI). Through the MoU, the two companies have agreed to provide services allowing transactions using domestic-use-only cards issued by BC Card in India and RuPay in South Korea. There are also plans to expand the areas of co-operation through the launch of BC Card-NPCI "co-branded" cards and development of new business models. NPCI released a circular on 8 April 2020 on acceptance of RuPay cards in South Korea.

==== Nepal ====
In April 2022, Nepal SBI Bank and Nepal Rastra Bank have enabled Rupay Payment Network in 14,000 POS in Nepal.

==== France ====
In June 2022, NIPL signed MoU with French payment company Lyra Network, that will allow Indian tourists and students make payment using RuPay on supported terminals and machines in France.

==== United Kingdom ====
In August 2022, NPCI announced that all POS terminals in UK under payment solution provider PayXpert will enable RuPay in partnership with NIPL.

==== Russia ====
India and Russia expressed interest in continuing dialogue on accepting RuPay and Mir within their respective national payment infrastructures. The 2022 Russian invasion of Ukraine, removal of Russian banks from SWIFT and exit of Visa, Mastercard cleared path for mutual acceptance of each other's electronic payment system. National Security Advisor Ajit Doval visited Moscow on 17 and 18 August 2022 to discuss mutual acceptance of Mir and RuPay cards in both nations.

==== Oman ====
India proposed use and acceptance of RuPay in Oman during an India-Oman Joint Commission Meeting hosted at New Delhi on 11 May 2022. The Omani delegation led by trade minister Qais bin Mohammed al Yousef responded positively on the proposal. NPCI signed MoU with Central Bank of Oman on 4 October 2022 to connect RuPay with similar system in Oman on a reciprocal basis.

==== Europe ====
As per MoU signed on 11 October 2022, Worldline SA will enable European merchants POS terminal to accept RuPay. The initial market expansion will happen in Belgium, the Netherlands, Luxembourg and Switzerland.

==== Mauritius ====
On 12 February 2024, India officially launched RuPay card services in Mauritius. Prime Minister Narendra Modi and Prime Minister Pravind Jugnauth of Mauritius formally inaugurated the service via video conference. RuPay card services will be extended to Mauritius, allowing Mauritian banks to issue cards utilizing the RuPay mechanism there and facilitating the use of RuPay cards for settlements in both Mauritius and India.

=== Future markets ===
==== Australia ====
On Indian Prime Minister's virtual meet with Australian Prime Minister on 4 June 2020, both the countries are exploring the possibility to launch Indian RuPay Card in Australia.

==== Philippines ====
Under the aegis of the Government of India, NPCI started discussion on infrastructure development for digital payment, financial inclusion and Direct Benefit Transfer. In 2021, NPCI also proposed RuPay as an alternative to Mastercard and Visa in Philippines to improve cross border bilateral trade and tourism.

==== Maldives ====
In May 2024, according to Mohamed Saeed, Minister of Economic Development and Trade, the Maldivian government is in talks with India about introducing RuPay cards in the country, which might support the Maldivian rufiyaa.

== Market share ==
RuPay's parent organisation, the National Payments Corporation of India (NPCI), has been backed by 10 leading banks. Of these are 6 public-sector banks: State Bank of India, Bank of Baroda, Punjab National Bank, Canara Bank, Union Bank of India, and Bank of India; 2 private-sector banks: ICICI Bank and HDFC Bank; and 2 foreign banks: Citibank and HSBC. Banks in India are authorised to issue RuPay debit cards to their customers for use at ATMs, PoS terminals, and e-commerce websites. RuPay's market share rose from 0.6% in 2013 to 50% by November 2018. A total of 628.41 million RuPay cards had been issued across all categories including prepaid, debit, credit, and commercial cards as of February 2021.

RuPay initially charged transaction processing fees that are approximately 23% lower than those charged by Visa and Mastercard. The NPCI charged a flat-fee per transaction of 60 paise from acquiring bank and 30 paise from the card issuing bank. For example, if a customer made a transaction with their RuPay card at a POS terminal operated by another bank, then the customer's bank (the bank that issued the card) would pay 30 paise to the NPCI while the bank that operates the POS terminal (the acquiring bank) would pay 60 paise to the NPCI. All merchant discount rate (MDR) charges were eliminated for RuPay transactions from 1 January 2020.

RuPay surpassed Visa as the largest payment card network in India by number of transactions in June 2017, recording 375 million (37.5 Crores) transactions. According to NPCI data released in May 2019, 112.7 Crore transactions (1.127 billion) valued at ₹1.174 Lakh Crores (US$17 billion) were made on RuPay cards during the 2018–19 fiscal year. RuPay held 58% of the market share by number of cards issued, 30% by number of point of sale transactions, and 25% by number of online transactions from around 11% two years ago.

RuPay reported 100 Crore (1 billion) transactions through both online and offline merchant payment modes in financial year 2019, a nearly 70% jump compared to the 667 million (66.7 Crore) transactions in financial year 2018, according to data sourced from the NPCI and the Reserve Bank of India. In terms of value, RuPay cards noted a rise of 80% in FY ’19, beating overall debit card payments which grew 30% compared to the previous fiscal year. NPCI issued 59.1 Crore (591 million) RuPay cards till December 2019 of which 22.9 Crore (229 million) cards were used for ATM transactions and 10 Crore (100 million) on PoS terminals. RuPay card usage for both ATM and PoS transaction is topped by Maharashtra for the year 2019. During COVID-19 pandemic, consumer usage of RuPay platform in India was hovering at 87% to 98% by spending volume above its foreign competitors Mastercard and Visa, which were at 70% to 86% due to reduction in discretionary spending as of March 2020. As of November 2020, more than 60 crore (600 million) RuPay cards were issued by the banks in India.

RuPay was appointed as an official partner of the Indian Premier League by the Board of Control for Cricket in India in a multi-year partnership beginning from the 2022 season.

== Jan Dhan Yojana ==
RuPay cards got a major boost through the Pradhan Mantri Jan Dhan Yojana through which they were issued to Jan Dhan account holders. By June 2018, 24.2 crore (242 million) RuPay debit cards were issued under the Jan Dhan Yojana compared with the 925 million debit cards issued by the banking industry during the same period. By January 2020, 76% of all Jan Dhan account holders held RuPay debit cards. As of 10 March 2021, a total of 308.5 million RuPay debit cards had been issued to Jan Dhan account holders.

Due to Digital India initiative and JAM trinity, the number of RuPay card in 2016 was less than half at 23 crore (230 million) which later surged to 56 Crores (560 million) as of November 2018. In 2013 ATM transactions constituted 90% of the total number and 95% of the total value. In 2018, PoS transactions have expanded to cover 30% of the total number and 10% of the total value of Debit Card Transactions.

== Initiative for farmers ==
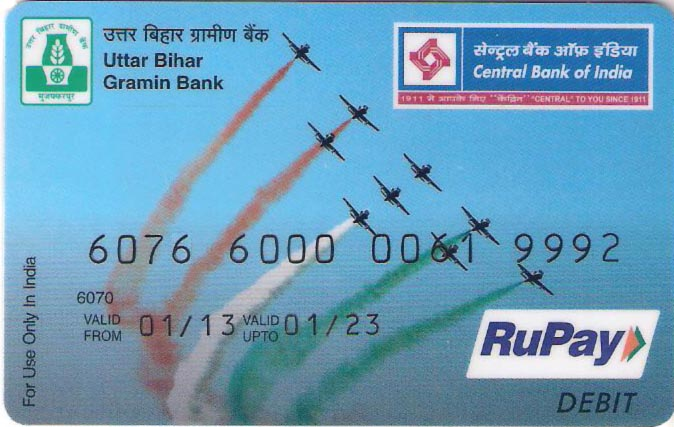
Regional Rural Bank Card

RuPay also provides a unified "Kisan card", issued by banks across the country as the Kisan Credit Card, enabling farmers to transact business on ATMs and PoS terminals.

PUNGRAIN (Punjab Grains Procurement Corporation Ltd) pays commission agents through the RuPay Debit Card and developed a commission agent network called the Kisan Arhtia Information and Remittance Online Network (KAIRON) with the help of the National Payments Corporation of India.

Kotak Mahindra Bank, in partnership with RuPay, rolled out an initiative for financial inclusion, where the dairy farmers across 75 cooperative societies of Amul in regions of Burdwan and Hooghly of West Bengal will be able to get their payments directly into their accounts on the same day as the sale of their milk.

The same model is planned to be adopted in the state of Gujarat where 1,200 cooperative societies comprising over 3 lakh dairy farmers will be the part of the programme.

In 2017 post demonetisation, the government decided that NABARD will co-ordinate the conversion of operative/live Kisaan Credit Cards into RuPay ATM cum Debit Kisaan Credit Cards by Cooperative Banks and Regional Rural Banks on priority.

== See also ==
- NPCI
- RBI
- BharatQR
- Unified Payments Interface
- Mastercard
- Visa
