= MITR ATM Sharing Network =

Interbank networks in India

MITR Network
- Operating area: India
- Members: 6
- Founded: 8 October 2003

MITR was a multilateral interbank network sharing arrangement of six member banks in India for automated teller machines (ATMs) that operated between 2003 and 2016. Punjab National Bank (PNB) acted as the settlement bank for the MITR Network

== History ==
It came into existence on 8 October 2003 with five member banks, Punjab National Bank (PNB), Oriental Bank of Commerce (OBC), Indian Bank, Karur Vysya Bank and IndusInd Bank with UCO Bank joining later. ATM transaction switching technology was provided by Chennai-based Financial Software Solutions Ltd.

The sharing arrangement formally ended in 2016 when each of the member banks joined the Indian National Financial Switch directly.

== Competitors ==
- Cashnet
- CashTree
- BANCS
