= Banks ATM Network and Customer Services =

Indian interbank network

BANCS
- Operating area: India
- Members: 13 Banks
- Founded: 25 February 2004; 22 years ago

Banks ATM Network and Customer Services (BANCS) is an interbank network in India. It was launched on 25 February 2004, with 13 member banks. It is managed by an advisory board consisting of member banks. It is the successor to the now-defunct Swadhan ATM network. After the WannaCry ransomware attack, several ATM were shut down in Kerala in May 2017

== Member banks ==
1. Bank of Maharashtra
2. Bank of Bahrain and Kuwait
3. Greater Bombay Co-op Bank
4. Centurion Bank
5. Central Bank of India
6. UTI Bank
7. Punjab & Sind Bank
8. IDBI Bank Ltd
9. RBL Bank
10. SBI Commercial & International Bank
11. Cosmos Bank
12. Air Corporation Employees Co-op Bank
13. Saraswat Bank

== Technology ==
BANCS is supported by the India Switch Company (ISC), acquired by eFunds in 2005, which in turn, was acquired by Fidelity National Information Services. ISC supports BANCS through a mix of VSATs, ISDN, leased lines, CDMA and GPRS. The financial switches used in the system are provided by Oasis Technology Ltd., Mumbai. The software used is from IBM, Solaris and Oracle.

== Competitors ==
- Cashnet
- MITR
- CashTree
