= BharatQR =

QR code payment system in India

- Product type: QR code payment
- Current owner: National Payments Corporation of India (NPCI)
- Country: India
- Introduced: 20 February 2017; 9 years ago
- Markets: India
- Website: www.rupay.co.in/rupay-advantage/bharat-qr

BharatQR, developed by NPCI, Mastercard, and Visa, is an integrated payment system in India for mobile device. The system was launched in September 2016. It facilitates users to transfer their money from one source to another. The money transferred through BharatQR is received directly in the user's linked bank account. It provides a common interface between RuPay, Mastercard, Visa and American Express, and is interoperable with all the banks.

== Overview ==
BharatQR was launched in September 2016. The system helps in enabling digital payments to reduce the usage of card machines for payment. A number of banks supported BharatQR, before the system was launched, and got ready to deploy it.

Although, BharatQR primarily works by scanning QR codes, it is not the only way to make payments. It allows users to pay through Aadhaar number, UPI payment address or through account number and IFSC code thus, minimizing the need to pay using debit and credit cards which are, supposedly, less secure than BharatQR. The system also supports dynamic QR code generation, which eliminates the need to enter the amount for payment.

This payment system supports RuPay, Mastercard, Visa, American Express and payment systems of 14 other national banks. Multiple cards can be linked to BharatQR supported bank apps and users can select any one of them to handle transactions conveniently for bank customers, partners, and merchants. BharatQR enables faster & secure mode of transactions with Immediate Payment Service (IMPS). There is no need to share mobile number or account details, or your CVV with anyone.

NPCI, Mastercard and Visa developed BharatQR with provisions for three additional fields: bank account and IFS (Indian Financial System) code, Unified Payments Interface (UPI) and Aadhaar. These additional fields provide banks the option to populate them as QR-based payments scale in the country. American Express is also on board to adopt these standards.

== Usage ==
Bijlipay became the first Indian Point-of-Sale (PoS) devices-providing company to use BharatQR on the screen of PoS machines.

ItzCash announced rolling-out Bharat QR code features across its retail network to scan and pay money with ItzCash's Point-of-Sale devices by presenting a cell phone to a reader, across its network of 75,000 outlets in 3,000 cities and towns across the India.

Samsung Pay, which earlier in 2017, integrated Samsung Pay mobile wallet with Unified Payments Interface, integrated BharatQR to pay at merchants supporting UPI payment system.
