= Banking Codes and Standards Board of India =

Banking watchdog in India

Agency overview
- Formed: 18 February 2006
- Dissolved: 28 September 2021
- Headquarters: Mumbai, Maharashtra
- Agency executive: A C Mahajan, Chairman
- Website: www.bcsbi.org.in

The Banking Codes and Standards Board of India (BCSBI) was an independent banking industry watchdog that protects consumers of banking services in India. The board oversaw compliance with the "Code of Bank's Commitment to Customers". It was not a compensation mechanism and looked into an individual complaint only to the extent it points to any systemic compliance failure. It was an independent and autonomous body, registered as a separate society under the Societies Registration Act, 1860 on 18 February 2006. The Reserve Bank of India extended financial support to the Board, meeting its expenses for the first five years.

However, on 28 September 2021, the member banks passed resolutions approving BCBSI dissolution.

== Main aims ==
- To plan, evolve, prepare, develop, promote and publish voluntary, comprehensive Code and Standards for banks, to provide fair treatment to their customers.
- To function as an independent and autonomous watchdog to monitor and ensure that the Codes and Standards are adhered to.
- To conduct and undertake research of Codes and Standards currently in use around the world.
- To enter into covenants with banks on observance of codes and standards and to train employees of such banks about the Codes.
- To help people affected by natural calamities.

== History ==
S S Tarapore (Former deputy general of RBI ) came up with an idea to form a committee for the benefit of customer so that they can get better financial services.

== Governing Council ==
The board was governed by a six-member governing Council including one chairman.

== Members ==
As of February 2013, 69 scheduled commercial banks, 11 Urban Co-operative Banks and 54 regional rural banks are members of the board.

== See also ==
- Indian Banks' Association
