= Tata Consultancy Services =

Indian multinational technology company

Tata Consultancy Services Limited
- Type: Public
- Traded as: BSE: 532540; NSE: TCS; BSE SENSEX constituent; NSE NIFTY 50 constituent
- ISIN: INE467B01029
- Industry: Information technology Consulting; Outsourcing
- Founded: 1968; 58 years ago
- Founder: J. R. D. Tata
- Headquarters: Mumbai, Maharashtra, India
- Area served: Worldwide
- Key people: Natarajan Chandrasekaran (Chairman); K. Krithivasan (MD & CEO)
- Revenue: ▲₹267,021 crore (US$29 billion) (2026)
- Operating income: ▲₹65,611 crore (US$7.0 billion) (2026)
- Net income: ▲₹49,454 crore (US$5.3 billion) (2026)
- Total assets: ▲₹182,372 crore (US$19 billion) (2026)
- Total equity: ▲₹108,478 crore (US$12 billion) (2026)
- Owner: Tata Sons (71.74%)
- Number of employees: ▼584,519 (March 2026)
- Parent: Tata Group
- Subsidiaries: MHP Management- und IT-Beratung; TRDDC
- Website: tcs.com
- Footnotes; Financials as of 31 March 2026.

Tata Consultancy Services Limited (TCS) is an Indian multinational technology company specialising in information technology services and consulting. Headquartered in Mumbai, it is a part of the Tata Group and operates in 150 locations across 46 countries. As of 2024, Tata Sons owned 71.74% of TCS, and close to 80% of Tata Sons' dividend income came from TCS.

TCS ranked seventh on the Fortune India 500 list for 2024. In September 2021, TCS recorded a market capitalisation of US$200 billion, becoming the first Indian IT company to achieve this valuation. However, its market capitalisation declined to under US$100 billion in June 2026. In 2012, it was the world's second-largest user of U.S. H-1B visas.

== History ==
=== 1968–2000 ===
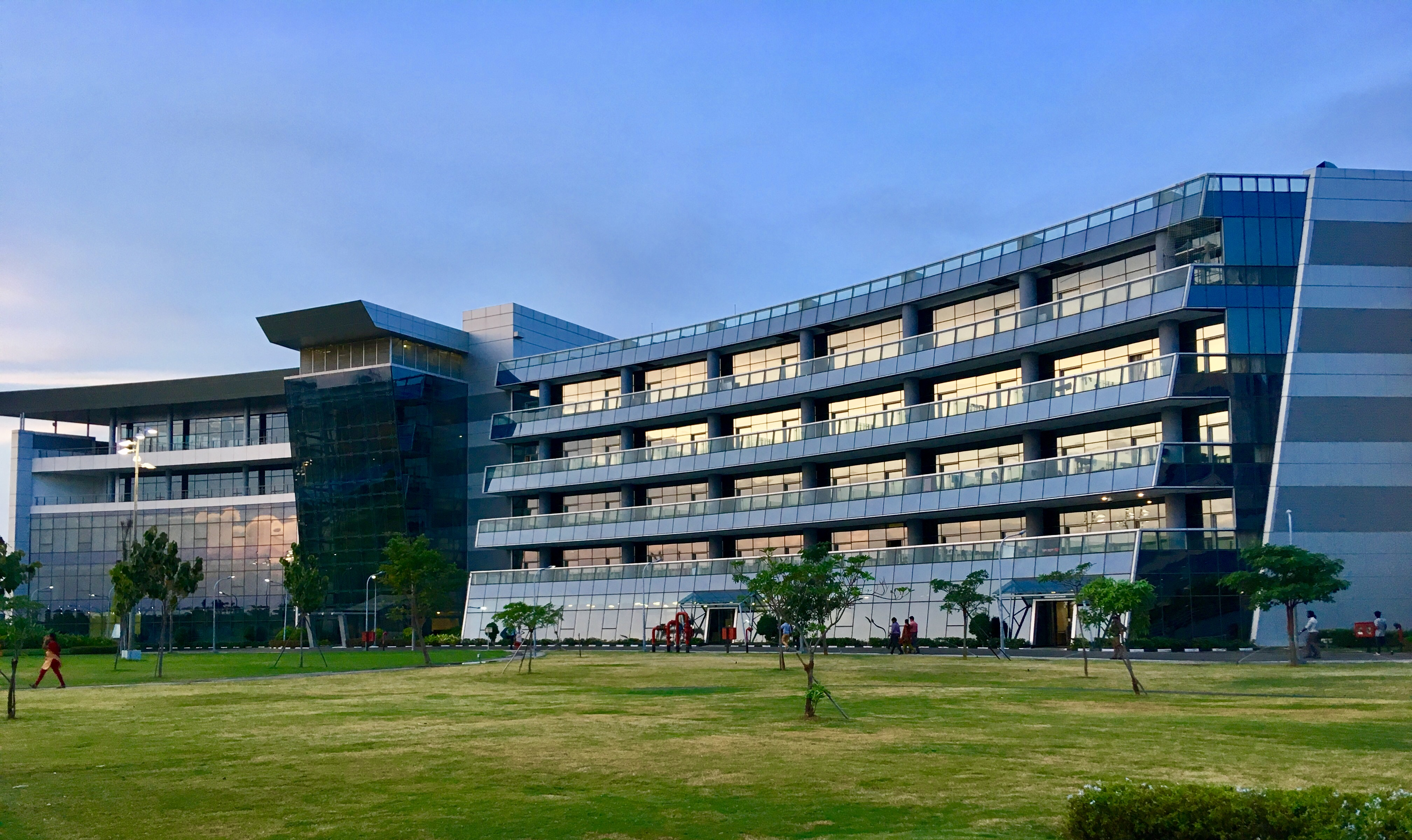
Tata Consultancy Services building in SIPCOT, Chennai

Tata Consultancy Services Limited, originally known as Tata Computer Systems, was established in 1968 by Tata Sons Limited. The company's initial contracts involved providing punched card services to its sister company TISCO (now Tata Steel), developing an Inter-Branch Reconciliation System for the Central Bank of India, and offering bureau services to the Unit Trust of India.

In 1975, TCS implemented an electronic depository and trading system named SECOM for Swiss company SIS SegaInterSettle. It also developed System X for the Canadian Depository System and automated the Johannesburg Stock Exchange. TCS also partnered with the Swiss firm TKS Teknosoft, which it later acquired.

In 1980, TCS established India's first dedicated software research and development centre, the Tata Research Development and Design Centre (TRDDC), located in Pune. The following year, it created India's first client-dedicated offshore development centre, established for Tandem.

Anticipating the Y2K bug and the introduction of the unified European currency (Euro), Tata Consultancy Services developed a factory model for Y2K conversion. The company also created software tools to automate the conversion process and facilitate implementation by third-party developers and clients. In late 1999, TCS introduced Decision Support System (DSS) solutions to the domestic market. In 1999, the company also registered its first tagline, "Beyond the Obvious."

=== 2001–2019 ===
In 2001, TCS entered the bioinformatics segment, and three years later, launched India's first bioinformatics product.

In 2003, TCS became the first Indian IT company to record $1 billion in revenue. On 25 August 2004, TCS became a publicly listed company after its initial public offering.

In July 2005, Tata Infotech, which was until then a different IT subsidiary of Tata Sons, merged with TCS in a stock swap deal. Later that year, TCS changed its tagline from "Beyond the Obvious" to "Experience Certainty".

In 2006, TCS developed an ERP system for the Indian Railway Catering and Tourism Corporation. By 2008, its e-business operations were generating over US$500 million in annual revenue.

In 2011, TCS entered the small and medium enterprises market with cloud-based solutions. On the final trading day of 2011, it surpassed RIL to achieve the highest market capitalisation of any India-based company. In the 2011–12 fiscal year, TCS achieved annual revenues exceeding US$10 billion for the first time.

In May 2013, TCS was awarded a six-year contract valued at over ₹11 billion (US$120 million) to provide services to the Indian Department of Posts. In 2013, the company moved from 13th to 10th place on the list of global IT services companies by revenue. In July 2014, it became the first Indian company to exceed ₹5 trillion (US$81.93 billion) in market capitalisation.

In January 2015, TCS became India's most profitable company, ending Reliance Industries Limited's 23-year streak.

In January 2017, TCS announced a partnership with Aurus, a payments technology company, to deliver payment solutions for retailers through TCS OmniStore, a unified store commerce platform. The same year, TCS China entered into a joint venture with the Chinese government.

In March 2018, Tata Sons sold TCS shares worth $1.25 billion in a bulk transaction.

In 2019, TCS received four Stevies at the American Business Awards.

=== 2020–present ===
On 8 October 2020, TCS surpassed Accenture in market capitalisation, becoming the world's most valuable IT company with a market capitalisation of over $144 billion. On 25 January 2021, TCS briefly reclaimed the title of the world's most valuable IT company from Accenture with a market cap of $170 billion. On the same day, TCS also became India's most valuable company, surpassing Reliance Industries.

In May 2021, TCS, in collaboration with its consortium partner Neurotechnology, was selected by the Unique Identification Authority of India (UIDAI) to provide biometric technology for the Aadhaar digital ID programme. The Aadhaar programme, which has a database of over 1.3 billion citizens, has been described by World Bank Chief Economist Paul Romer as the "most sophisticated ID program in the world."

In 2021, TCS underwent a millennial rebranding, and the company updated its tagline from "Experience Certainty" to "Building on Belief". In 2021, Tata Consultancy Services was also one of the largest job providers in India, hiring 43,000 new employees in the first half of the fiscal year 2021–22.

In July 2025, TCS announced that it would downsize its global workforce by 2%, or about 12,000 employees, primarily from middle- and senior-level positions, citing a "skill mismatch". In October 2025, TCS set up a subsidiary called HyperVault for a 1 GW data centre in India, announcing a capex of up to $7 billion over 5 to 7 years. In November 2025, private equity firm TPG agreed to invest $1 billion in HyperVault for a 49% stake, with TCS continuing to hold the remaining 51%.

In June 2026, TCS partnered with Anthropic to train 50,000 TCS employees on Anthropic's Claude AI models and jointly develop enterprise AI solutions for regulated industries.

== Acquisitions ==
Name	Date	Industry	Country	Cost	Employees	Ref.
CMC Limited	October 2001	Embedded software	India	$33.9m	3,102	
Airline Financial Support Services India (AFSI)	January 2004	Airline and hospitality BPO	India	$5.1m	400	
Aviation Software Development Consultancy India (ASDC)	March 2004	IT services	India	$3.1m	180	
Phoenix Global Solutions	May 2004	Insurance consulting and BPO	India	$130m	400	
Swedish Indian IT Resources AB (SITAR)	May 2005	IT services	Sweden	$4.8m	n/a	
Pearl Group	October 2005	Insurance	United Kingdom	$94.7m	950	
Financial Network Services (FNS)	October 2005	Core banking software	Australia	$26m	190	
Comicrom	November 2005	Banking BPO	Chile	$23m	1,257	
Tata Infotech	February 2006	IT services	India	$259.2m	3,600	
TCS Management	November 2006	IT services	Australia	$13m	35	
TKS-Teknosoft	November 2006	Banking software	Chile	$80.4m	115	
Citigroup Global Services	December 2008	Banking and financial services BPO	India	$512m	12,472	
SuperValu Services India	September 2010	IT services and BPO	India	$100m	600	
Computational Research Laboratories	August 2012	High performance computing	India	$34m	80	
Alti SA	April 2013	IT services	France	$97.5m	1,200	
BridgePoint Group	November 2018	Management consulting	United States			
Postbank Systems	November 2020	IT services	Germany			
Pramerica Systems Ireland	December 2020	IT services	Ireland		1,500	
Darshita Southern India Happy Homes	March 2025	Real estate	India	$260m		

== Corporate affairs ==
=== Geographical presence ===
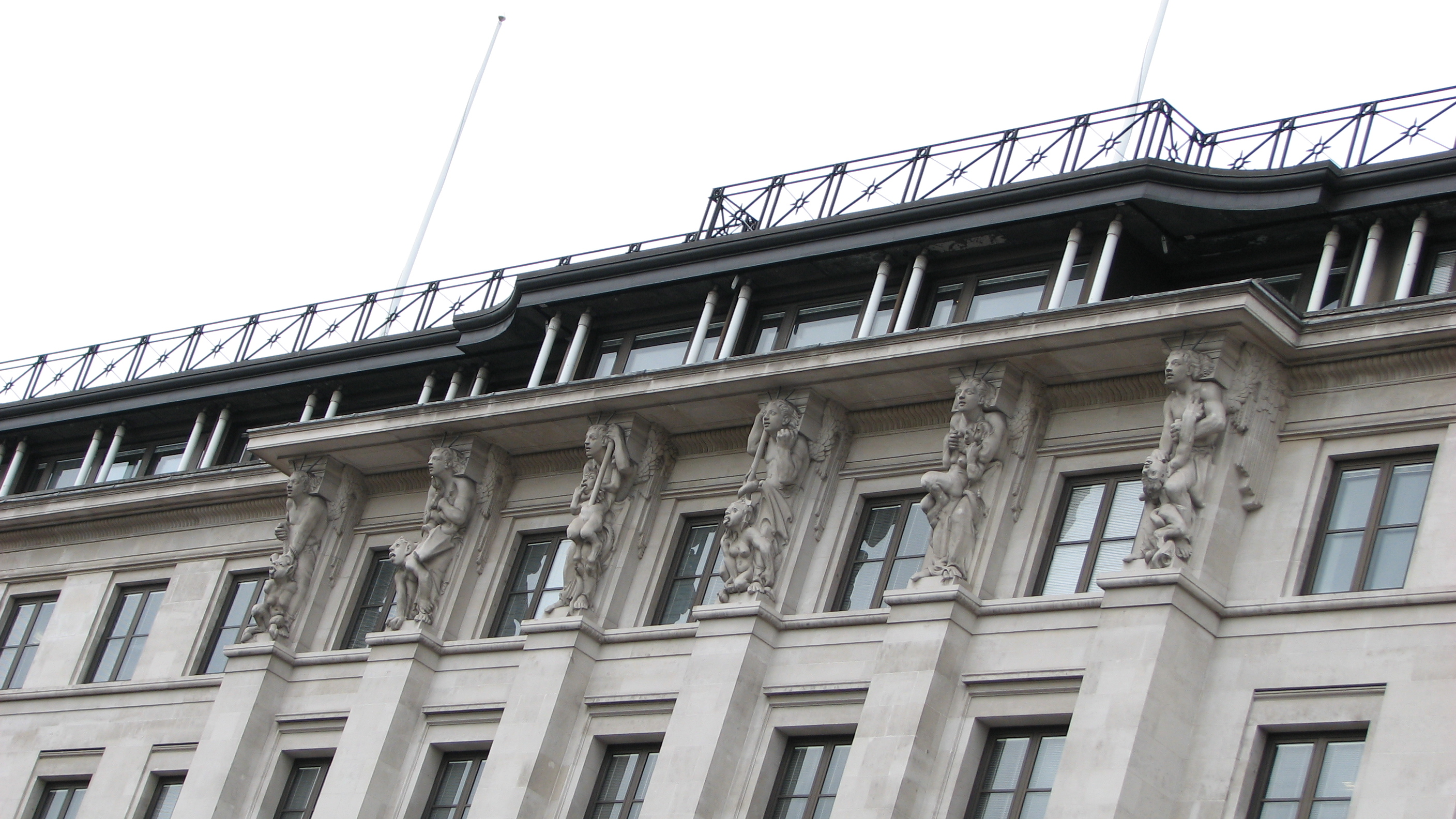
TCS UK headquarters at Grosvenor Place, London

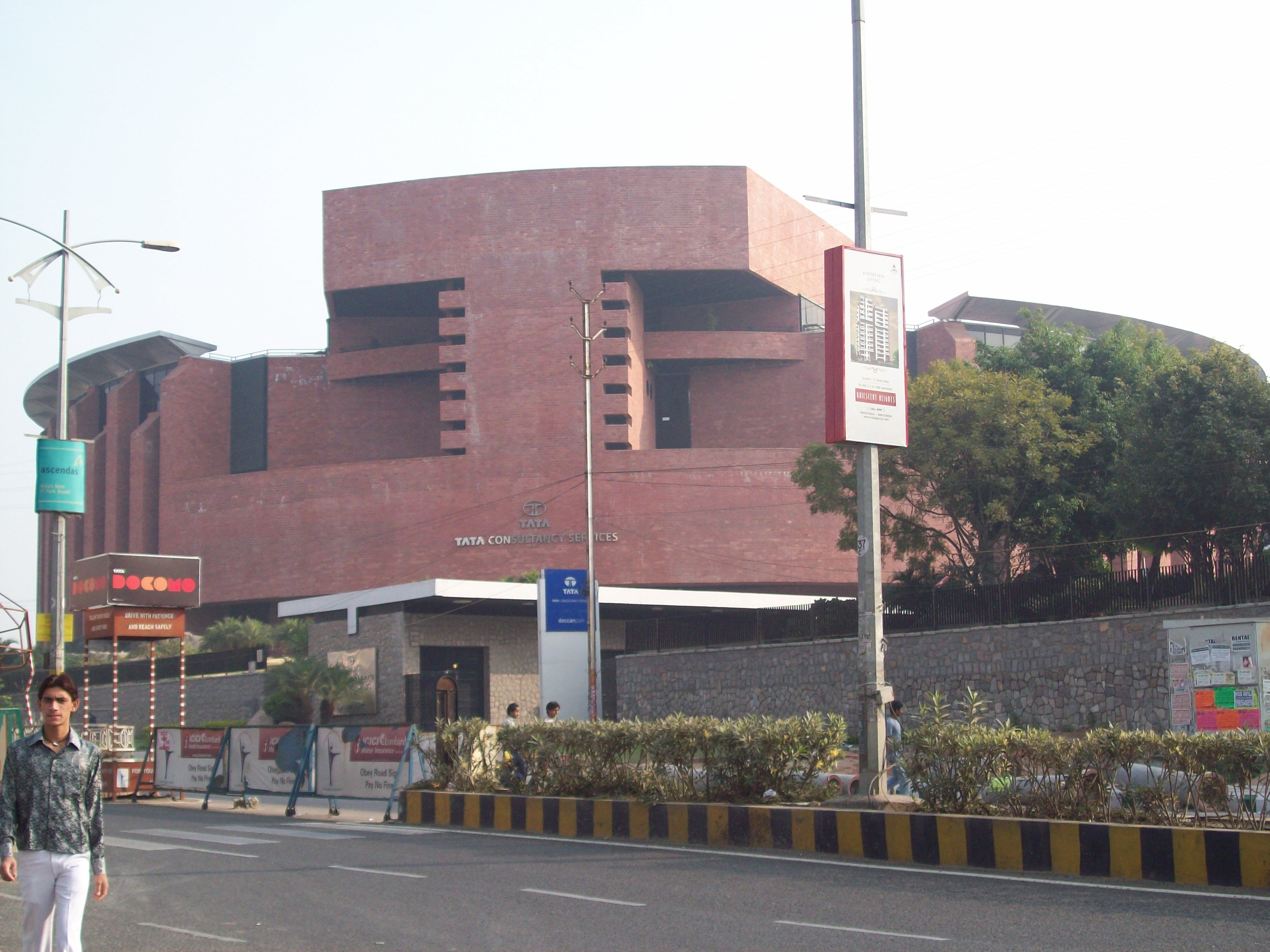
Tata Consultancy Services, Deccan Park campus in Hyderabad

The company reported a global headcount of 584,519 employees across 56 countries, as of March 2026. In India, TCS has multiple delivery centres in major cities, including Mumbai, Bangalore, Chennai, and Hyderabad. The company maintains subsidiaries across the Americas, Europe, Asia Pacific, the Middle East and Africa.

=== Employees ===
Tata Consultancy Services (TCS) is one of the largest private-sector employers in India, and ranked as the fourth-largest employer overall in 2015, following Indian Railways, Indian Army, and India Post. In July 2022, the employee count of TCS crossed 600,000, with a net addition of about 100,000 in one year.

In 2008, TCS was the fifth-largest recipient of H-1B visas in the United States, following Infosys, Cognizant, Wipro, and Satyam. In 2012, TCS and other Tata Group companies were the second-largest recipients of H-1B visas. As of 31 March 2013, the number of non-Indian nationals employed by TCS was 21,282, representing 7.7% of the workforce.

=== Leadership ===
TCS has had five CEOs since its inception in 1968.

CEO	Tenure
F. C. Kohli	1968–1996
Subramaniam Ramadorai	1996–2009
Natarajan Chandrasekaran	2009–2017
Rajesh Gopinathan	2017–2023
K. Krithivasan	2023–present

== Business divisions ==
=== Products and platforms ===
In 2021, the software products and SaaS-based platforms business of TCS generated about $3 billion in revenue, accounting for 12–15% of the company's total revenue, according to COO N. Ganapathy Subramaniam. Its notable products included TCS BaNCS, TCS Cognix, TCS Quartz, TCS HOBS, TCS MasterCraft, and TCS OmniStore. Its business unit TCS iON includes a learning and assessment platform for competitive exams and recruitment tests.

In 2015, TCS started an enterprise software venture called Digitate, based in Pune and Santa Clara, which released its artificial intelligence platform Ignio the same year.

=== TCS BPS ===
The TCS BPS division provides business process management services. It had an estimated revenue of $3.5 billion in financial year 2023–24, as per an Everest Group report.

TCS BPS also provides services for biopharmaceutical majors, including clinical research, data management, biostatistics, medical writing, clinical programming, pharmacovigilance, and RWE support towards global drug development efforts.

=== Tata Research Development and Design Centre ===
TCS established India's first software research centre, the Tata Research Development and Design Centre, in Pune, in 1981. TRDDC undertakes research in software engineering, process engineering, bioinformatics, and systems science. In 2005, researchers at TRDDC developed MasterCraft, a model-driven development software that can automatically create code from a computer language, and rewrite the code based on the users' needs.

TRDDC and Tata Chemicals jointly developed Sujal (later marketed as Tata Swach), a low-cost water purifier manufactured using rice husk ash and silver nanoparticles. TCS deployed thousands of these filters in the relief activities of the Indian Ocean tsunami disaster of 2004.

=== Innovation labs ===
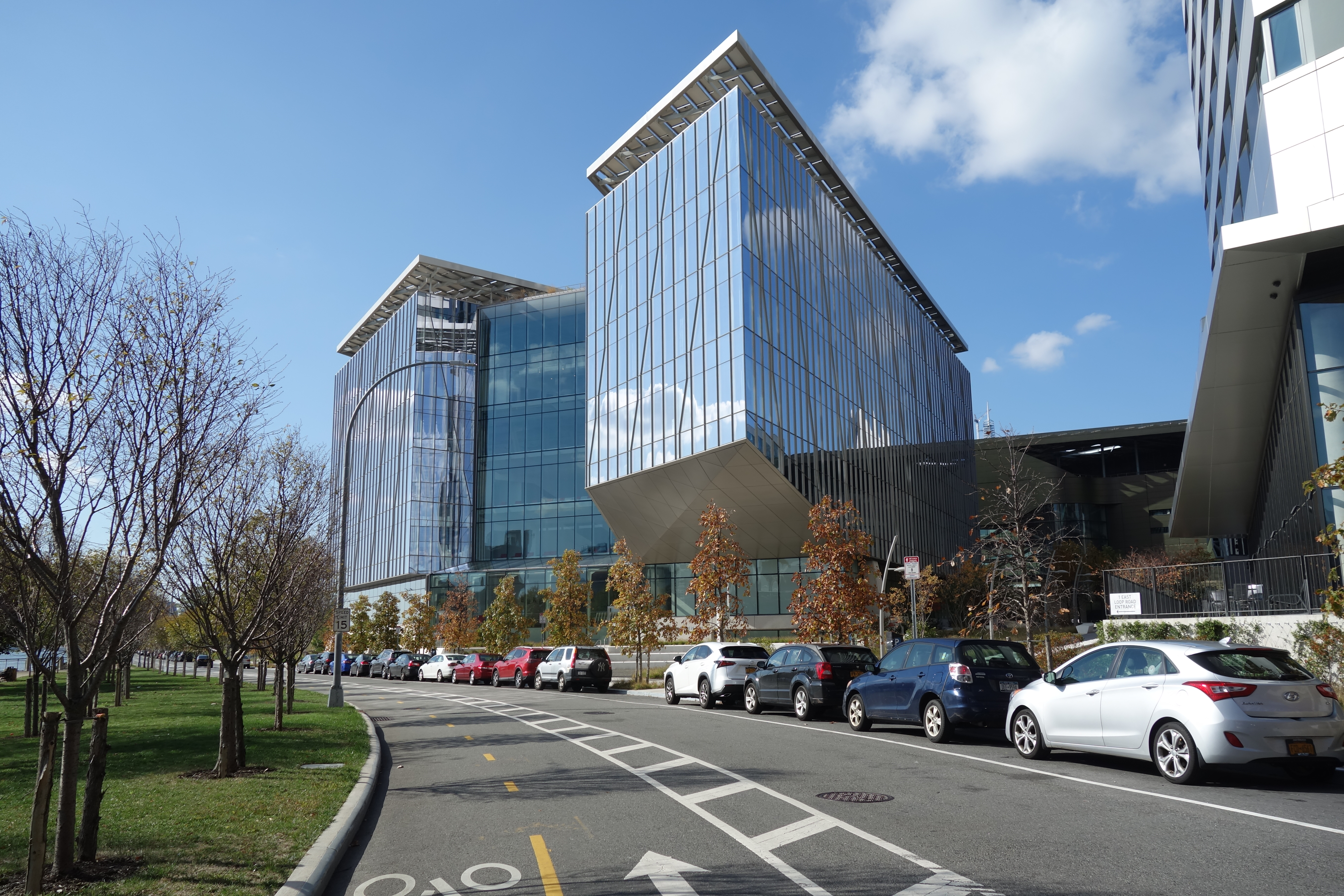
Tata Innovation Center at Cornell Tech campus in New York City

In 2007, TCS launched its co-innovation network, a network of innovation labs, start-up alliances, university research departments, and venture capitalists. In addition, TCS has 19 innovation labs based in three countries. TCS' partners include CollabNet and Cassatt, and academic institutions such as IITs, Stanford, MIT, and Carnegie Mellon, and venture capitalists like Sequoia and Kleiner Perkins.

== Sponsorships ==
TCS is the title sponsor for Toronto Waterfront Marathon, London Marathon, Amsterdam Marathon, Mumbai Marathon, Lidingöloppet, and New York City Marathon and one of the sponsors of City2Surf, Australian Running Festival, Berlin Marathon, Chicago Marathon, and Boston Marathon. In India, it is the title sponsor of World 10K held in Bangalore every year.

TCS has been a sponsor of the Indian Premier League team Rajasthan Royals since 2009. It also provides the team with technology to help in the analysis of player performance, simulation, and use of RFID tags for tracking the players’ fitness levels and for security purposes in the stadiums.

TCS conducts an annual IT quiz for high school students called TCS IT Wiz. TCS also currently sponsors Jaguar Racing in Formula E and Nakajima Racing in Super Formula.

== Controversies ==
=== US class action lawsuits ===
In 2006, the US law firm Lieff Cabraser filed a class action lawsuit against TCS on behalf of non-US citizens employed in California between 2002 and 2005. The plaintiffs alleged they were compelled to endorse their federal and state tax refunds to the company and faced unauthorised deductions from their US pay. In February 2013, TCS agreed to a $30 million settlement, which was granted final approval by Judge Claudia Wilken of the US District Court for the Northern District of California in July 2013.

In 2024, TCS became the subject of multiple putative class-action lawsuits and a formal probe by the US Equal Employment Opportunity Commission (EEOC) regarding discriminatory hiring and firing practices. Former American employees alleged that TCS had terminated older US workers and non-South Asians, replacing them with Indian expatriates on H-1B and L-1 visas to lower operational costs. TCS has consistently denied these allegations, stating its employment decisions are based on performance and business restructuring needs rather than national origin or age.

=== 2026 Nashik BPO workplace harassment case ===
In early 2026, multiple employees at the Tata Consultancy Services (TCS) Business Process Outsourcing (BPO) campus in Nashik, Maharashtra, filed First Information Reports (FIRs) alleging sustained sexual harassment and religious coercion by several team leaders. The allegations, which reportedly span from 2022 to 2026, prompted the Nashik Police to form a Special Investigation Team (SIT).

As part of the probe, six female police officers were deployed undercover as employees within the facility for 40 days to monitor workplace interactions and gather evidence. By mid-April 2026, authorities had registered nine FIRs and arrested seven employees, including several team leaders and an Assistant General Manager of Human Resources. The SIT investigation highlighted an alleged failure of the facility's internal grievance mechanisms. Police reported that the HR executive was arrested for explicitly ignoring dozens of written complaints, emails, and chat messages from the victims, thereby failing to trigger mandatory POSH (Prevention of Sexual Harassment) protocols.

TCS suspended the accused employees and initiated an investigation.

=== Trade secret lawsuits ===
In a lawsuit filed in October 2014 in the US District Court in Madison, Epic Systems accused TCS and Tata America International Corp of "brazenly stealing the trade secrets, confidential information, documents, and data" belonging to Epic. This lawsuit was amended in January and December 2015. In April 2016, a US jury imposed a US$940 million fine on TCS and Tata America International Corp in the trade secret case, which was reduced to US$420 million in 2017. In 2020, an appeals court ruled that the US$280 million in punitive damages was "constitutionally excessive", but upheld the remaining portion of US$140 million in compensatory damages. The case concluded in November 2023, with TCS agreeing to pay US$125 million.

In 2019, Computer Sciences Corporation (now DXC Technology) filed a lawsuit against TCS alleging misappropriation of trade secrets by TCS to develop its TCS BaNCS software platform. In 2023, a US jury originally awarded $210 million in damages, later reduced to $168 million by a district court. In June 2026, the United States Supreme Court declined to hear TCS's appeal, following which, TCS announced an additional $70 million provision for the settlement, bringing its total provision to $220 million.

=== Sexual harassment allegations ===
In 2019, an employee filed a complaint with the Kancheepuram labour court, alleging that Tata Consultancy Services' internal complaints committee mishandled a sexual harassment case. Despite the case being approved, there has been no significant progress over the years, with the worker accusing the company of delaying investigations. The worker has also reported unexplained transfers and other forms of alleged workplace retribution, including in performance reviews.

== See also ==
- List of IT consulting firms
- List of largest employers in India
- Information technology in India
- List of Indian IT companies
