= TCS BaNCS =

Banking software suite by Tata

- Original author: Financial Network Services
- Developer: Tata Consultancy Services
- Release: 1983
- Stable release: 14.0 / 2019; 7 years ago
- Written in: Java
- Operating system: Cross-platform
- Type: Banking software
- Website: https://www.tcs.com/bancs

TCS BaNCS is a core banking software suite developed by Tata Consultancy Services for use by retail banks.

It includes functions for universal banking, core banking, payments, wealth management, forex and money markets, compliance, insurance, securities processing, custody, financial inclusion, Islamic banking and treasury operations. There are also modules that deal with capital markets and the insurance business. The suite of products is periodically evaluated by independent research firms such as Forrester.

== History ==
Prior to the corporate takeover by TCS, the BaNCS software was developed at the headquarters of Financial Network Services Pty (FNS) in Sydney Australia. First implemented into local Australian and New Zealand banks and credit unions throughout the late 1970s and into the 1980s the demand from overseas markets grew substantially looking for automation and consolidation of disparate systems. Project sites across Asia, Middle East and Nordic countries led to multiple versions being developed in different geographies. In the mid 1980s the software came under the control of the Systems Development Office at 70 Rosehill Street, Redfern in Sydney. Base versions from 1.0 through to 7.6 were developed by FNS. Various region specific business rules were designed and integrated with parameterised functionality into the Base Software in sub-versions from customer sites via the Redfern Development Office.

Two major branches were existed from version 2 through 4 of the core. Initially based on AT&T/NCR 9800 series mainframe architecture - platform versions were created for UNIX and later (from version 4 onwards) on NT/Windows Server. The core applications COBOL source code was interchangeable, but interfacing software, such as API gateways, transaction queues and data storage differed to cater for the platform and database choices demanded from customers. The core application is written in C and linked to the Microfocus COBOL runtime system-linked objects. Scripting varied across branches to handle technical operations and non-functional requirements.

Major versions featured multi-currency (with spot positions), multi-language and some multi-entity functionality. To cater for this, various front-ends were created such as BTM (Branch Terminal Manager) application, a web based teller system (BANCSLink) and BEAM-handled transactions from tellers. ATM and POS switch and card management (Telepac) modules were also built out extensively in the 1980s in line with the increasing reliance on debit and credit cards globally at the time

Major version 6 included three back-end database technologies: Oracle, Informix and DB2. The UNIX Variants included HP-UX, IBM AIX and AT&T NCR System V UNIX variants. ksh (Korn Shell) was the primary script language.

In the 1990s and 2000s, Internet Banking (BANCS Connect), Treasury, FX/MM, Trade Finance were also developed with multiple client sites supported and upgraded onto later versions as the software matured and customers reaped benefits of further functionality

Version 7.6 and onward was developed in COBOL by the Tata Consultancy Services business unit TCS Financial Solutions.

TCS furthermore re-wrote the base application in Java to cater for the limited supply of COBOL software engineers into the 2000s. TCS entered and won a prestigious Consensus Software Award in 2005. Judged by many independent industry judges, it was a clear indication that the BaNCS software was ready for worldwide success.

Notable client implementations included a Australia and New Zealand tier 2 banks and credit unions, Tier 1 banks in South Korea, Taiwan and China, State Bank of India and large nationwide banks in India, National Bank of Kuwait, and multiple banks in Saudi Arabia, North and South Africa. A partnership with Telenor Novit existed throughout the 1980s and 1990ms that powered multiple Scandinavian banks as well.

In August 2013, Panzhihua (PZH) Commercial Bank started using the software, making it the first Chinese city commercial bank to use the TCS BaNCS solution.
