= Oracle Financial Services Software =

Subsidiary of Oracle Corporation

Oracle Financial Services Software Limited
- Formerly: i-flex Solutions
- Type: Public
- Traded as: BSE: 532466; NSE: OFSS
- Industry: Enterprise software
- Founded: 1990; 36 years ago
- Founders: Rajesh Hukku; Deepak Ghaisas; R. Ravisankar
- Headquarters: Mumbai, India
- Key people: Sridhar Srinivasan (Chairperson); Avadhut Ketkar (CEO and MD)
- Revenue: ₹6,373 crore (US$660 million) (2024)
- Operating income: ₹2,680 crore (US$280 million) (2024)
- Net income: ₹2,219 crore (US$230 million) (2024)
- Number of employees: 8,754 (2024)
- Parent: Oracle Corporation
- Website: www.oracle.com/in/financial-services
- Footnotes; Financials as of March 31, 2024.

Oracle Financial Services Software Limited (OFSS) is an Indian subsidiary of Oracle Corporation which is involved in financial and insurance technology. Established in 1990, the company was known as i-flex Solutions a core banking platform, prior to its acquisition by Oracle. It is headquartered in Mumbai.

== History ==
=== Early history ===
In 1992, the non-Citi operation’s software business was spun off into a separate company, Citicorp Information Technology Industries Ltd. (Citil), subsequently called i-flex Solutions. The venture, headed by Rajesh Hukku, received seed funding of $400,000 from Citicorp.

Citil inherited the legacy software Microbanker from Citi Overseas Software. With the revenue from selling Microbanker to customers in mostly Africa and later to other markets, Citil invested in developing Flexcube, a core banking platform. Flexcube was very successful and claimed the top spot in the annual sales ranking by International Banking Systems, a U.K.-based industry publication, in 2002.

=== Oracle Corporation ===
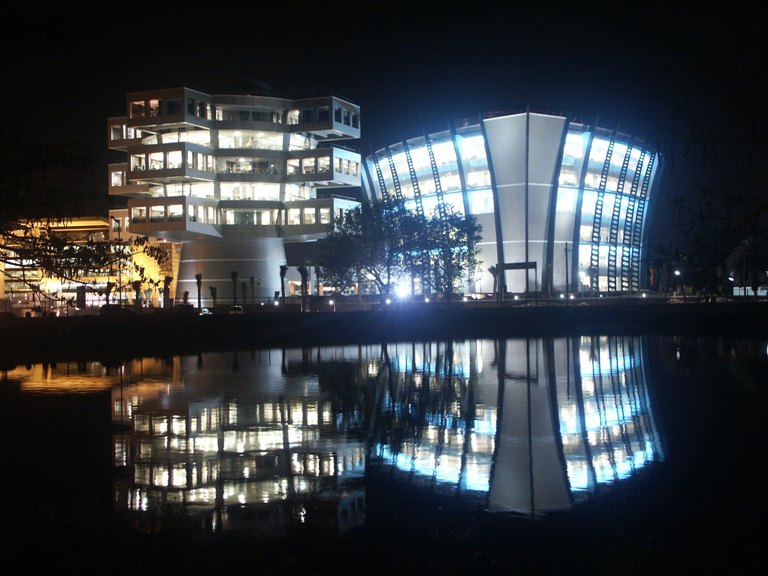
Oracle Financial Services Software – Bagmane Tech Park, Bangalore

Oracle purchased Citigroup's 41% stake in i-flex Solutions for US$593 million in August 2005, a further 7.52% in March and April 2006, and 3.2% in an open-market purchase in mid-April 2006.

In August 2006, i-flex Solutions acquired Mantas, a US-based anti-money laundering and compliance software company for US$122.6 million. The company part-funded the transaction through a preferential share allotment to the majority shareholder Oracle Corporation.

On 12 January 2007, after an open offer price to minority shareholders, Oracle increased its stake in i-flex Solutions to around 83%.

On 4 April 2008, Oracle changed the name of the company to Oracle Financial Services Limited.

Now, Oracle Financial Services Software Limited is a major part of Oracle Financial Services Global Industry Unit (FSGIU).

== Products and services ==
Oracle Financial Services Software Limited has two main streams of business. The products division (formerly called BPD – Banking Products Division) and PrimeSourcing. The company's offerings cover retail, corporate, and investment banking, funds, cash management, trade, treasury, payments, lending, private wealth management, asset management, and business analytics. The company undertook a re-branding exercise in the latter half of 2008. As part of this, the corporate website was integrated with Oracle's website. Various divisions, services, and products were renamed to reflect the new identity post-alignment with Oracle.

Recently, Oracle Financial Services launched products for Internal Capital Adequacy Assessment Process, exposure management, enterprise performance management and energy, and commodity trading compliance.

In 2002, DotEx International Joint Venture NSE.IT and i-flex Solutions Ltd signed a memorandum of understanding (MoU) with BgSE Financials Ltd to provide Internet trading services.

== See also ==
- List of IT consulting firms
- Fortune India 500
- List of companies of India
- TCS BaNCS
- Finacle
