= R Subramaniakumar =

Indian banker and businessman

- Occupation: Banker
- Title: MD and CEO, RBL Bank
- Term: 2022 - present

R Subramaniakumar is the managing director and chief executive officer of RBL Bank.

== Early life and education ==
Subramaniakumar is a Physics graduate with PGDCA.

== Career ==
Subramaniakumar started his career with Punjab National Bank and lead the Business Transformation. He was the executive director at Indian Bank. He was the executive director and also the MD and CEO of Indian Overseas Bank. He was an administrator at Dewan Housing Financial Corporation. He also was an Independent Director of the LIC Pension Fund Limited. On 24 June 22, he joined RBL Bank as the managing director and chief executive officer.
