= Unity (credit union) =

New Zealand credit union

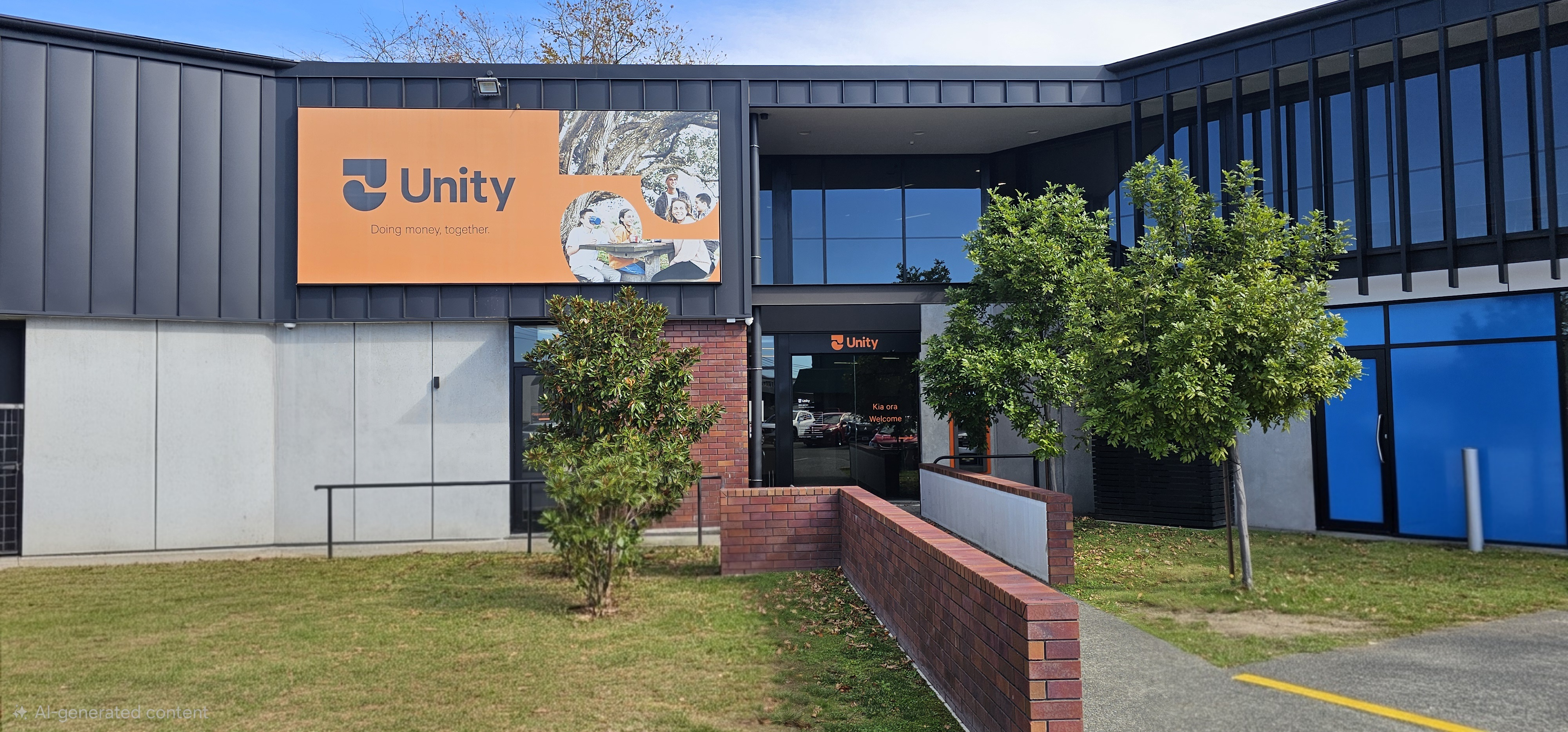
- Head office of Unity in Hastings
- Trade name: Unity
- Type: Nonprofit organization
- Industry: Financial services
- Founded: 1971; 55 years ago (as Whakatu Freezing Works Employees’ Credit Union)
- Headquarters: Hastings, New Zealand
- Area served: New Zealand
- Key people: Kevin Hughes (CEO); Kevin Angland (Board Chair)
- Products: Personal loans, term deposits, savings and transactional accounts, home loans
- Website: unitymoney.co.nz

Unity is a New Zealand financial co-operative, with a head office in Hastings.

As of 2025, Unity was the second-largest of New Zealand's three credit unions. As of 2026, it has eight branches located in Hastings, Lower Hutt, Napier, Waipukurau, Dunedin, Kawerau, Rotorua and Invercargill.

== History ==
Originally established in 1971 in Hawke's Bay as Whakatu Freezing Works Employees' Credit Union, it later became NZCU Baywide.

In 2019, NZCU South, NZCU Central and Aotearoa Credit Union merged with NZCU Baywide. The combined entity was rebranded as Unity Credit Union (trading as Unity) in 2021, with its new head office in Hastings.

As of 2026 the Chief Executive is Kevin Hughes, who was appointed to the role in April 2023.

In 2024, Unity's credit rating was downgraded by Fitch Ratings to B. Fitch stated that it expected Unity's loan impairment charges to remain high, citing a softening New Zealand economy, higher unemployment, and Unity continuing to deal with older unsecured personal loans. Its asset base had decreased by $132 million and its membership declined by 15,000; in 2023, its return on assets was negative. In response, chief executive Kevin Hughes said that Unity had changed its strategy, and remained a viable business with forecasting showing a return to profitability. In the 2024/2025 fiscal year, Unity reduced its losses to $8.2 million, down from $17.6 million the previous year.
