= TCS IT Wiz =

TCS IT Wiz is an information technology quiz-based competition for students in class 8-12 across India. It is held annually in India and the UAE by Tata Consultancy Services (TCS). The UAE edition of the quiz was discontinued after 2014. The first competition was in 1999. More than 15,000 students entered the competition. The competition is conducted by "Pickbrain" (Giri Balasubramanium), the chief executive officer of Greycaps India Private Limited. Greycaps is an on-stage quiz and knowledge service provider based in Bangalore, India.

== Competition ==
The first annual competition was held in Bangalore in 1999. In 2000, it was held in six cities and in 2011, it was held in 14 cities followed by national finals. On 8 December 2012, the finals were held in Chennai and won by New Era Public School, Mayapuri. On 15 December 2013, the finals were held in Taj Land's End, Mumbai and won by Modern School, Barakhamba Road. The finals of the 2014 competition were also held at Taj Land's End and were won by P. S. Senior Secondary School. The 2015 competition was won by Adnan Azmat and Shadan Kalam from Rajendra Vidyalaya, Jamshedpur. The 2016 winners were Parth Dhar and Pranava Dhar from Delhi Public School, Noida. The 2017 winners were Ansh Arora and Pranava Dhar from Delhi Public School, Noida. The 2018 competition was won by Nihar Shah and Bhavya Raninga of St. Kabir School, Vadodara. The 2019 edition of the quiz was won by Yashovardhan Shetty and Udbhav Saxena from The Hyderabad Public School, Begumpet. The 2021 edition of the quiz was won by Sandeep Murugesh from St. Judes Public School & Junior College.
