= Tata Research Development and Design Centre =

Software research centre in India

TATA Research Development and Design Centre
- Type: Subsidiary
- Industry: Software research; Machine Learning; Software Engineering; Process Engineering; System Research
- Founded: 1981; 45 years ago
- Headquarters: Pune, Maharashtra, India
- Parent: Tata Consultancy Services
- Website: www.tcs-trddc.com

Tata Research Development and Design Centre (TRDDC) is a software research centre in Pune, India, established by Tata Group's TCS in 1981. TRDDC undertakes research in Machine Learning, Software Engineering, Process Engineering and Systems Research.

TRDDC developed TCS Code Generator Framework (formerly called MasterCraft), an artificial intelligence software that can automatically create code from a simple computer language and rewrite the code based on the user's needs.

Research at TRDDC has also resulted in the development of Swach (formerly known as Sujal), a low-cost water purifier that can be manufactured using locally available resources. TCS deployed thousands of these filters in the Indian Ocean tsunami disaster of 2004 as part of its relief activities.

== Innovation ==
In 2007, TCS launched its Co-Innovation Network, a network of TCS Innovation Labs, startup alliances, University Research Departments, and venture capitalists.

In addition to TRDDC, TCS has 19 Innovation Labs based in three countries.

- TCS Innovation Lab, Convergence: Content management and delivery, convergence engines, networks such as 3G, WiMax, WiMesh, IP Testing for Quality of Service, IMS, OSS/BSS systems, and others.
- TCS Innovation Lab, Delhi: Software Architectures, Software as a Service, natural language processing (NLP), text, data and process analytics, multimedia applications and graphics.
- TCS Innovation Lab, Embedded Systems and Robotics, Kolkata and Bengaluru: Medical electronics, Machine Vision, Robotics, WiMAX, and WLAN technologies.
- TCS Innovation Lab, Hyderabad: Computational methods in life sciences, meta-genomics, systems biology, e-security, smart card-based applications, digital media protection, nano-biotechnology, quantitative finance.
- TCS Innovation Lab, Mumbai: Speech and natural language processing, wireless systems and wireless applications.
- TCS Innovation Lab, Insurance – Chennai: IT Optimisation, Business Process Optimisation, Customer Centricity Enablers, Enterprise Mobility, Telematics, Innovation in Product Development and Management (Product lifecycle management) in Insurance.
- TCS Innovation Lab, Chennai: Infrastructure innovation, green computing, Web 2.0 and next-generation user interfaces.
- TCS Innovation Lab, Peterborough, England: New-wave communications for the enterprises, utility computing and RFID (chips, tags, labels, readers and middleware).
- TCS Innovation Lab: Performance Engineering, Mumbai: Performance management, high performance technology components, and others.
- TCS Innovation Lab, Cincinnati, United States: Engineering and Manufacturing IT solutions.

Some of the assets created by TCS Innovation Labs are DBProdem, Jensor Jensor released as Open Source, Wanem Wanem released as Open Source, Scrutinet.

In 2008, the TCS Innovation Lab-developed product, mKrishi, won the Wall Street Journal Technology Innovation Award in the Wireless category. mKrishi is a service that would enable India's farmers to receive useful information on an inexpensive mobile device.

TCS' Co-Innovation Network partners include Collabnet, Cassatt, foreign academic institutions such as Stanford University, MIT, various IITs, and venture capitalists like Sequoia and Kleiner Perkins.
