= Prithvi Vallabh =

Prithvi Vallabh, Prithvivallabh or Prithvi-vallabh may refer to:

- Prithvi-vallabha (title), a Sanskrit title adopted by several rulers of different dynasties of India
  - Vakpati Munja (c. 972–990s), Parmara king popularly associated with this title
- Prithivivallabh (novel), a 1921 Gujarati historical novel by Kanaiyalal Munshi
- Prithvi Vallabh (1924 film), a silent historical film directed by Manilal Joshi, an adaptation of the 1921 novel Prithivivallabh
- Prithvi Vallabh (1943 film), a Hindi film directed by Sohrab Modi, based on 1921 novel Prithivivallabh
- Prithvi Vallabh (TV series), also known as Prithvi Vallabh - Itihaas Bhi, Rahasya Bhi, a 2018 Indian TV series inspired by the novel

== See also ==
- Balhara (title), Arabic transliteration of the title
