= RBL Bank =

Indian bank

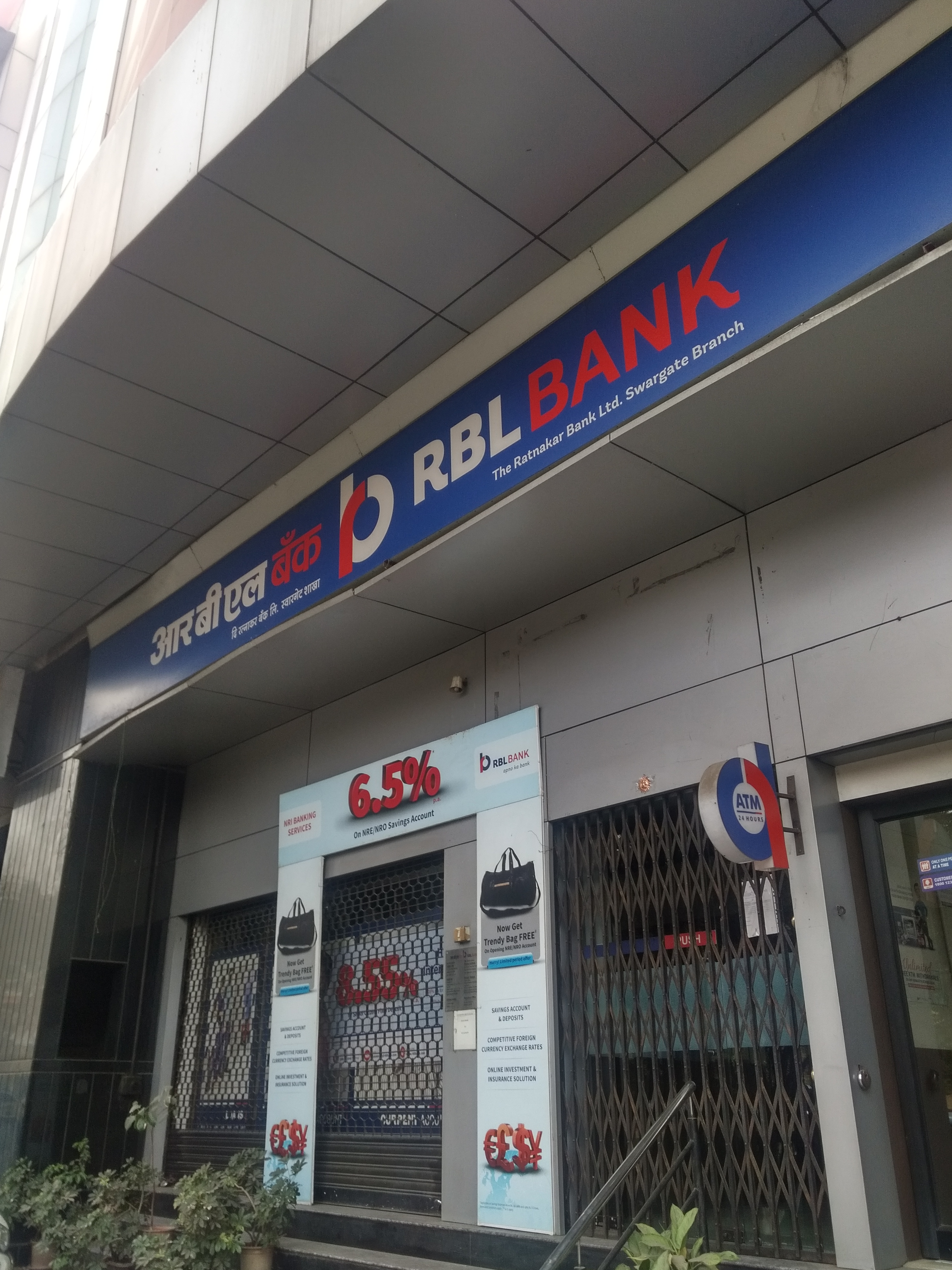
- An RBL Bank branch in Pune, Maharashtra
- Type: Subsidiary
- Traded as: BSE: 540065; NSE: RBLBANK
- Industry: Banking, Financial Services
- Founded: August 1943; 83 years ago
- Headquarters: Mumbai, Maharashtra, India
- Key people: R Subramaniakumar (MD & CEO)
- Products: Consumer banking, corporate banking finance and Insurance, credit cards
- Revenue: ▲₹17,845 crore (US$1.9 billion) (2025)
- Operating income: ▲₹3,627 crore (US$380 million) (2025)
- Net income: ▲₹10,269 crore (US$1.1 billion) (2025)
- Total assets: ▲₹146,725.48 crore (US$15 billion) (2025)
- Number of employees: 14,265 (2025)
- Website: www.rbl.bank.in

RBL Bank (formerly known as Ratnakar Bank Limited). is an Indian private sector bank founded in 1943 and headquartered in Mumbai. It offers services across five verticals: corporate banking, commercial banking, branch banking and retail liabilities, retail assets, and treasury and financial markets operations.

In June 2026, Emirates NBD acquired a 60% stake in the bank.

== History ==
On 6 August 1943, Ratnakar Bank was founded as a regional bank in Maharashtra with two branches in Kolhapur and Sangli by Babgonda Bhujgonda Patil from Sangli and Gangappa Siddappa Chougule from Kolhapur. It mainly served small and medium enterprises (SMEs) and business merchants in the Kolhapur-Sangli belt. The bank was incorporated in Kolhapur district on 14 June 1943 as Ratnakar Bank Limited. In 1959, the bank was categorized as a scheduled commercial bank as per the Reserve Bank of India Act, 1934. During this decade, it was referred to as an NH4 Bank. In 1970, it received a banking license from the Reserve Bank of India (RBI).

In 2013, Ratnakar Bank acquired Royal Bank of Scotland's business banking, mortgage, and credit cards business divisions in India.

In August 2014, the name of the bank was changed to RBL Bank Limited.

RBL Bank was registered and listed on the Bombay Stock Exchange (BSE) on August 31,2016, following its initial public offering (IPO)

On 12 June 2022, R Subramaniakumar was appointed as the Managing Director and CEO of the bank. RBL Bank announced integration of UPI and National Common Mobility Card capabilities with RuPay credit cards on 1 August 2024.

On 18 October 2025, UAE-based bank Emirates NBD announced that it will acquire a 60% stake in RBL Bank for ₹26,850 crore (US$3.05 billion) through a preferential issue of shares. In June 2026, it completed the acquisition for US$2.75 billion.

== Operations ==
As of 2026, it has a network of 628 branches across 28 states and union territories. It has 14,265 employees. The bank also has a network of 1,272 business correspondent branches, of which 952 are managed by RBL Finserve Limited.

In 2018, RBL Bank partnered with MoneyTap to launch India's first personal credit line-based app. In June of the same year, the company announced that it had raised its stake in microlender Swadhaar FinServe to 100 per cent.

=== Funding ===
Between 2010 and 2020, the bank raised equity and debt capital from several investors, including Barings Private Equity Asia, British International Investment (formerly CDC Group), Multiples Alternate Asset Management, the Asian Development Bank, HDFC Ltd., ICICI Prudential Life Insurance, and Gaja Capital.

== See also ==
- Banking in India
- List of banks in India
- List of companies of India
