= Cashnet =

Interbank network in India

- Operating area: Worldwide
- Members: 14
- ATMs: 10,700
- Owner: Euronet India

Cashnet is an interbank network in India managed by Euronet Services India Pvt. Ltd. which is a subsidiary of Euronet Worldwide.

Banks can join the Cashnet shared ATM network whereby each member banks' cardholders can perform transactions at other member banks' ATMs. Member banks will allow their customers to perform transactions at other member banks ATMs ("Issuing Bank") and allow other member banks' cardholders to perform transactions at their ATMs ("Acquiring Bank"). All member banks are expected to be both Issuing Banks and Acquiring Banks.

Euronet India provides the central switching and processing centre for the shared ATM network by establishing a host-to-host connection to each member bank, facilitating daily settlement between each participant and providing settlement reports. Switching and gateway services to international card organisations such as Visa, MasterCard, Amex and Diners Club will be provided.

== History ==
The Reserve Bank of India (RBI) has granted the following approval on 8 April 2003. Cashnet was officially launched in Mumbai on 21 May 2003, and is the first Independent nationwide-shared ATM network in India.

Cashnet is India's largest private shared ATM network with IDBI Bank acting as the Settlement Bank.

== Members ==
The network has 14 member banks with an approximate network strength of 10,700+ ATMs. The member banks of Cashnet are:

- Axis Bank
- Barclays Bank
- Citibank
- Corporation Bank
- Dena Bank
- Deutsche Bank
- Development Credit Bank
- Dhanalakshmi Bank
- HDFC Bank
- HSBC
- IDBI Bank
- ING Vysya Bank
- Standard Chartered Bank
- Kotak Mahindra Bank

== Competitors ==
- CashTree
- MITR
- BANCS
