= Deepak Ghaisas =

Indian businessman

Deepak Ghaisas is the chairman of Gencoval Strategic Services Pvt Ltd. Previously, he was the CEO from 1997 of India Operations and CFO of global operations from 1993 for I-flex Solutions Ltd., India. He has worked in the software industry since 1987.

Ghaisas has been involved in the software industry in a number of roles, including:

- Executive Member of The NASSCOM Executive Council
- Member of the CII Executive Council for Western India

Deepak resigned from I-flex on 8 August 2008, just before it was renamed Oracle Financial Services Software.

Deepak also is a chairman of IIITDM Jabalpur, board of Governor.
