= CashTree =

Interbank network in India

Cash Tree
- Operating area: India
- Members: 6
- Founded: 2003; 22 years ago

CashTree is an interbank network in India founded by five public sector banks, Syndicate Bank, Bank of India, Indian Bank, United Bank of India and Union Bank of India, for sharing their automated teller machine (ATM) networks.

The network was founded in 2003, with Dena Bank later joining the network.

== Members ==
- Bank of India
- Dena Bank
- Indian Bank
- Syndicate Bank
- United Bank of India
- Union Bank of India

== Competitors ==
- Cashnet
- MITR
- BANCS
