= Dynamic QR code =

Modifiable two-dimensional barcode

A dynamic QR code is a type of quick response (QR) code, where the destination data can be modified after the code has been generated.

Unlike static QR codes, which permanently encode fixed information, a dynamic QR code contains a short redirection URL or an identifier that points to an online resource. When scanned, the device is directed to this intermediary link, which then forwards the user to the intended content. This method of indirection allows the code's target destination to be updated on the server-side without altering the printed QR code itself.

== Background ==
The concept of the dynamic QR code emerged around 2008–2009. In 2009, uQR.me was developed as the first platform for creating and managing editable, or dynamic, QR codes. This platform introduced a redirection layer that allowed a printed code's destination to be edited remotely. Early adopters in the early 2010s included marketing firms that used the technology to alter campaign links and track user engagement.

The broader adoption of QR codes accelerated in the late 2010s after smartphone cameras began to include native QR scanning capabilities, such as in Apple's 2017 iOS update. The COVID-19 pandemic (2020–2021) was a major factor in the widespread implementation of QR codes for contactless information delivery. Restaurants used them for digital menus, public health agencies for contact tracing, and retail stores for mobile payments.

== Technology ==
A dynamic QR code operates by separating the physical code from its final content. A static QR code directly encodes data such as a URL or text into its pattern, making it unchangeable once printed. A dynamic QR code, however, encodes a short URL or an identifier that links to a redirect service. When a user scans the code, their device accesses this short link, which then redirects to the target content configured by the code's owner. This allows the end destination to be modified within the management platform at any time, while the physical QR code remains unchanged.

This editability is a primary feature of technology. Users can log into a management service to modify the URL or content to which a dynamic QR code resolves, even after its distribution. This allows for the correction of errors or the updating of content without needing to regenerate the code. The mechanism relies on an online server for redirection, which means an active internet connection is required for the end-user.

Another capability is the collection of scan analytics. As each scan is processed through an intermediary service, the event can be logged. This allows organizations to gather data on the number of scans, the time and date of scans, the general location of the user via IP address, and the device type. These metrics are used to measure the performance of marketing campaigns and user engagement. The tracking occurs in real time and can be integrated with other analytics platforms. Due to the server-side management required for redirection and tracking, dynamic QR codes typically require a subscription to a service provider. The reliability of the code is dependent on the continued operation of this provider.

Compared to static codes that encode long strings of data, dynamic QR codes often have a less dense pattern because they only contain a short URL. This can result in a simpler pattern that is easier and faster for cameras to scan, particularly in print applications where the code might be small or scanned under suboptimal conditions.

== Applications ==
Dynamic QR codes are used in a variety of industries due to their ability to be updated and to provide analytics. In marketing and advertising, dynamic QR codes are printed on materials such as posters, magazine ads, and product packaging to link physical media to online content. This allows advertisers to change the linked promotion or information without reprinting materials and to track user engagement to measure the return on investment of print campaigns. For example, a QR code on a product can be updated to link to different promotions or contests over time.

In retail and product packaging, dynamic QR codes provide consumers with access to supplemental information like instructions, warranty registration, or nutritional data. Manufacturers can keep this information current even after products have been distributed. This is also a component of the GS1 initiative to expand the use of QR codes on retail products by 2027, as a single dynamic code can serve multiple functions for both consumers and the supply chain.

Public institutions and government bodies use dynamic QR codes to disseminate information that requires frequent updates. Museums use them to provide information about exhibits, which can be changed for new installations. During the COVID-19 pandemic, health authorities used dynamic QR codes for check-ins and to link to the latest health guidelines. Restaurants adopted them for digital menus, allowing for easy updates to menu items and prices.

In the health care sector, dynamic QR codes are used to provide patient information. For example, a QR code on a medication label can link to audio instructions in different languages. If the patient's prescription changes, the linked audio file can be updated without needing to replace the physical label on the medication bottle. This application has been shown to improve patient adherence to treatment regimens.
