= Vallabh Bhanshali =

Indian investment banker (born 1952)

- Born: 4 March 1952 (age 74); Pali Marwar, India
- Citizenship: Indian
- Education: Sydenham College of Commerce and Economics; University of Mumbai
- Occupation: Investment Banker
- Known for: Served on the board of directors for the Reserve Bank of India
- Spouse: Suraj Balai (m. 1977)
- Children: 3

Vallabh Bhanshali (born 4 March 1952 in Pali Marwar) is an Indian investment banker, and venture capitalist best known for co-founding the Enam Group in 1984, where he served as its chairman until 2018. He has previously served as a trustee on the first index committee at the Bombay Stock Exchange, as a committee member for SEBI, and served on the board of directors for the Reserve Bank of India, and Axis Bank.

== Education ==
He completed his undergraduation from Sydenham College of Commerce and Economics and his law degree from University of Mumbai and is also a chartered accountant.

== Career ==
As an investment banker, he is widely credited for aiding Narayan Murthy to bring Infosys to an IPO in 1993, and the IPO of Coal India in 2010. A founding member for FLAME University and the Indian School of Public Policy, he previously served as chairman of the Global Vipassana Foundation, and was the host for the talkshow Kaun Hai Bharat Bhagya Vidhata on CNBC Awaaz in 2011. In 2012, he also ventured into solar energy. He has an honorary doctorate from Teerthanker Mahaveer University, and is a fellow of the Institute of Chartered Accountants of India.
