= Kisan Credit Card =

Credit card

The Kisan Credit Card (KCC) scheme is a credit scheme introduced in August 1998 by Indian public sector banks to issue kisan credit card to the farmers of India. This model scheme was prepared by the National Bank for Agriculture and Rural Development (NABARD) on the recommendations of the R. V. Gupta Committee to provide advances for agricultural needs.

Its objective was to meet the comprehensive credit requirements of the agriculture sector and by 2019 for fisheries and animal husbandry by giving financial support to farmers. Participating institutions include all commercial banks, Regional Rural Banks, and state co-operative banks. The scheme entails short-term credit for crops and term loans. KCC credit holders are also covered under personal accident insurance up to ₹50,000 for death and permanent disability, and up to ₹25,000 for other risks. The premium is borne by both the bank and the borrower in a 2:1 ratio. The validity period is five years, with an option to extend it up to three more years. Kisaan Credit Card (KCC) credit to the farmers is of two types, viz., 1. Cash Credit (for working capital) and 2. Term Credit (for capital expenditure such as the purchase of cattle, pump sets, land development, plantation, drip irrigations, etc.

== See also ==
- Debt bondage in India
