= Indian Banks' Association =

Representative body of management of banking in India

The Indian Banks' Association (IBA), formed on (26 September 1946), is an unregistered, voluntary association of like-minded banks and individuals in India—a representative body of Indian banks and financial institutions based in Mumbai. With an initial membership of 22 banks in India in 1946, IBA currently represents 247 banking companies operating in India. IBA was formed for the development, coordination, and strengthening of Indian banking and to assist the member banks in various ways, including the implementation of new systems and the adoption of standards among the members.

Indian Banks' Association is managed by a managing committee, and the current managing committee consists of one chairman, 3 deputy chairmen, 1 honorary secretary and 26 members.

On 20 November 2020, Union Bank of India's MD and CEO Rajkiran Rai was elected as the new Chairman of IBA. Dinesh Khara, Chairman of State Bank of India; Madhav Nair, Country Head and CEO of Mashreq Bank; and S. S. Mallikarjuna Rao, MD and CEO of Punjab National Bank, were elected as deputy chairmen. Rakesh Sharma, MD and CEO of IDBI Bank, was elected as the Honorary Secretary for 2020–2021. The Chief Executive of IBA is Sunil Mehta, and chief executive Gopal Bhagat. On 14 October 2021, Managing Committee of IBA elected Shri Goel as Chairman of IBA.

== Legal structure ==
The Indian Banks' Association (IBA) is an unregistered, voluntary association of like-minded banks and individuals. It lacks statutory recognition or legal incorporation. Established on September 26, 1946, initially comprising private banks, it later expanded its membership. Although some banks joined the public sector in 1970, the IBA's operations remained unchanged. Today, its members encompass a diverse range, including Public Sector Banks, Private Sector Banks, Foreign Banks, Urban Co-operative Banks, Asset Reconstruction Companies, Credit Rating Companies, Credit Guarantee Funds, Financial Services Companies, Credit Bureaus, and more.

== Managing committee ==
The banks which are members of the managing committee of the IBA include:

=== Public sector banks ===
- Bank of Baroda
- Bank of India
- Canara Bank
- Indian Bank
- Indian Overseas Bank
- Central Bank of India
- Punjab National Bank
- State Bank of India
- UCO Bank
- Union Bank of India
- Punjab & Sind Bank

=== Private sector banks ===
- Jammu & Kashmir Bank Limited
- HDFC Bank
- ICICI BANK LTD
- AXIS BANK LTD
- Bank of America
- Citibank
- City Union Bank
- JPMorgan Chase Bank
- Federal Bank
- Karnataka Bank
- Bank of Bahrain & Kuwait
- Qatar National Bank
- South Indian Bank
- Standard Chartered Bank

=== Co-operative sector banks ===
- Saraswat Co-operative Bank Ltd
- NNSB - NAGPUR NAGARIK SAHAKARI BANK LTD Nagpur Nagarik Sahakari Bank Ltd.
- MAHESH BANK A. P. Mahesh Co-operative Urban Bank Ltd.

=== Payments banks and small finance banks ===
- Equitas Small Finance Bank
- Unity Small Finance Bank
