= Banking software =

Software used in banking

Banking software refers to computer systems used by financial institutions to manage and deliver banking services. These systems support functions such as account management, transaction processing, record keeping, and customer interactions across various channels. Banking software may include core baking systems as well as applications for online, mobile, and automated services. Its development has been influenced by changes information technology, regulatory requirements, and evolving banking practices.

== Categories ==
Banking software encompasses a broad range of systems designed to support different functions within a financial institution. These systems are typically classified by the type of banking activity they support or the operational layer they address.

=== Core Banking Systems ===
Core banking systems (CBS) are the backbone of a bank’s operations. They manage key transactional processes such as deposits, withdrawals, interest calculations, loan servicing, and customer account maintenance. These systems operate in real time and are critical for ensuring consistency and accuracy across branches and digital channels.

=== Loan Management Systems ===
Loan management systems, also referred to as loan servicing systems, support the administration of loans throughout their term, from disbursement to final repayment or write-off. Typical functions include repayment schedule generation, interest and fee calculation, payment allocation, restructuring and rescheduling, collections and delinquency management, and portfolio and regulatory reporting. These systems are used by commercial banks, microfinance institutions, and non-bank lenders, including digital lending and consumer finance providers, to service products ranging from personal and payroll loans to mortgages and asset-backed credit. Although core banking systems include loan servicing modules, standalone loan management software is often adopted by lenders that operate outside a full banking license or that require specialised support for credit decisioning, loan origination, and collections.

=== Digital Banking Platforms ===
Digital banking platforms enable customer-facing services such as online banking, mobile apps, and self-service portals. They provide the user interface and service orchestration required for retail and business banking clients to interact with their accounts, make payments, or access financial products.

=== Treasury and Capital Markets Systems ===
These systems are used by banks to manage liquidity, trading, investment portfolios, and capital market operations. They support functions such as risk analysis, treasury transactions processing system, derivatives processing, and securities settlement. Solutions in this category often include modules for interest rate management and regulatory capital tracking.

=== Payment Processing Systems ===
Payment systems support the execution of transactions across multiple payment rails, including ACH, SWIFT, SEPA, card networks, and real-time payments. These systems are designed to process high volumes of transactions securely and in compliance with global payment standards.

=== Risk and Compliance Software ===
This category includes tools designed to meet regulatory obligations and monitor financial and operational risks. Features may include anti-money laundering (AML), know your customer (KYC), fraud detection, sanctions screening, and audit trail generation. Compliance software is often updated to reflect changes in international frameworks such as Basel III, FATF recommendations, or GDPR.

=== Retail banks ===
Commercial or retail banks use what is known as core banking software which records and manages the transactions made by the banks' customers to their accounts. For example, it allows a customer to go to any branch of the bank and do their banking from there. In essence, it frees the customer from their home branch and enables them to do banking anywhere.

Moreover, core banking software enables integration with channels such as ATMs, internet banking platforms, payment networks and SMS based banking. This integration allows customers to access banking services through multiple channels, supporting broader accessibility and consistency in the service delivery.

Banking software is used by millions of users across hundreds or thousands of branches. This means that the software must be managed on many machines even in a small bank. The core banking system is a major investment for retail banks and maintaining and managing the system can represent a large part of the cost of running a bank. Due to its critical role in banking operations and customer interactions, maintaining the smooth functioning and security of the core banking software is important for financial institutions.

=== Investment banks ===
Investment banks use software to manage their dealing departments and their client's accountants. These systems often connect to financial markets such as securities exchanges or third-party providers of financial information about international market.

For example, a company such as Bloomberg is a financial software, news, and data company that offers financial software tools through the Bloomberg Terminal. Another example is Reuters whose products specialize in financial information management, purchase order management, positions and risks, and financial instrument sales.

These types of companies provide control solutions and overall productivity for corporate treasury, improved workflow, central banking, bank treasury, exchange and global back-office operations. Examples of these back-office tasks include IT departments that keep the phones and computers running (operations architecture), accounting, human resources (customer relations) and sales and marketing where they come into contact with their customers.

With the help of these software companies, there is efficiency and proper management of transactions both in the front and back offices of banking firms and other financial institutions.
