= Saraswat Co-operative Bank =

Indian banking institution

Saraswat Co-operative Bank Ltd.
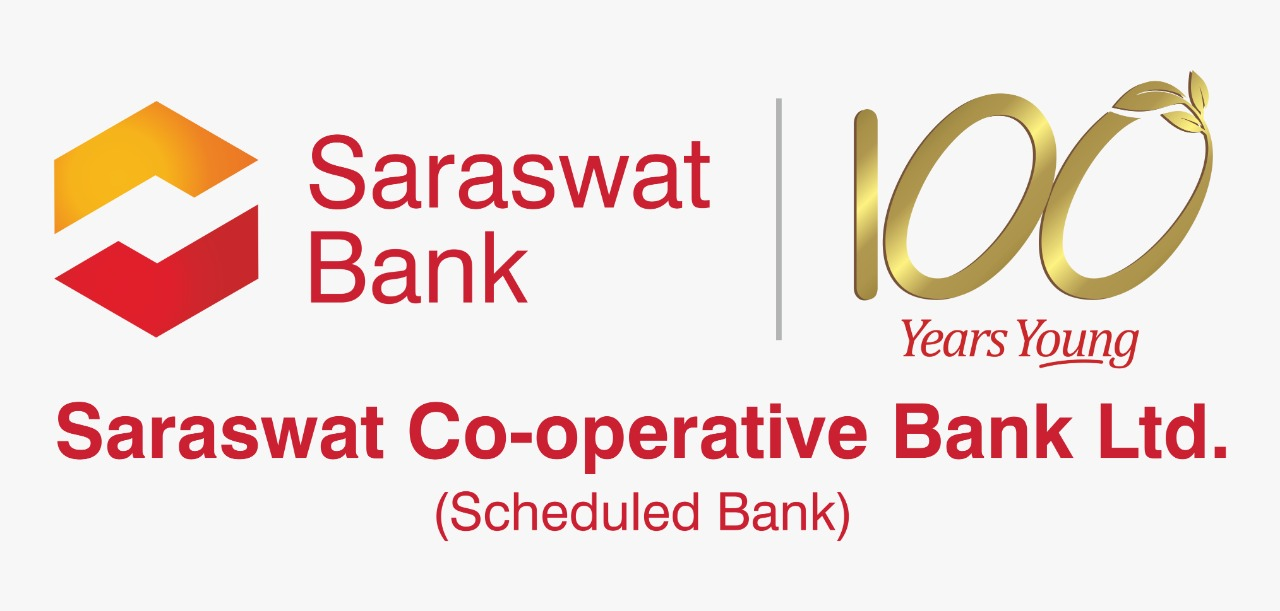
- Type: Multi-State Co-operative Bank
- Industry: Financial services
- Founded: 14 September 1918; 108 years ago
- Headquarters: Saraswat Co-operative Bank Ltd, Ekanath Thakur Bhawan 953, Appasaheb Marathe Marg, Prabhadevi. Mumbai- 400 025
- Key people: Gautam Thakur (Chairman); S. K. Banerji (Vice-chairman)
- Products: Commercial Banking; Retail Banking; Private Banking; Insurance
- Revenue: ▲₹3,552.58 crore (US$370 million) (2022-23)
- Net income: ▲₹355.49 crore (US$37 million) (2022-23)
- Total equity: ₹3,023.75 crore (US$310 million) (2022-23)
- Number of employees: 4,650 (as of March 2023)
- Website: saraswatbank.com, https://saraswat.bank.in

Saraswat Co-operative Bank Ltd. is an urban co-operative banking institution, having its headquarters in Mumbai, Maharashtra, India and operating as a co-operative society since 1918. The Founding Members of the society were J.K. Parulkar as chairman, N.B. Thakur as vice-chairman, P.N. Warde as Secretary, and Shivram Gopal Rajadhyaksha as Treasurer.

== History ==
In 1988, the bank was conferred with the Scheduled status by the Reserve Bank of India. It is the first co-operative bank to provide merchant banking services. It received a permanent license to deal in foreign exchange in 1979. Presently, it has a correspondent relationship in 58 countries covering nine currencies with over 162 banks.

The bank's total business was approximately ₹4,000 crore in the year 2000, and had reached ₹63,422 crore in 2020.

In the last two decades, the bank has witnessed a steady growth in business and has undertaken several strategic business initiatives, such as business process reengineering, and merging and nurturing seven cooperative banks. The bank has relations with VISA International for the issuance of debit cards. It launched RuPay EMV Debit Card in 2013–14. The bank was the first to achieve this milestone in respect of RuPay EMV cards along with the Bank of Baroda.

In 2011, the bank was granted permission for All India Area of Operation by the Reserve Bank of India.

The bank has a network of over 300 fully computerised branches and 350 ATMs (Automated teller machine) as on 31 March 2025 covering eight states viz. Maharashtra, Gujarat, Madhya Pradesh, Karnataka, Goa, Haryana, Uttar Pradesh and Delhi.

From the annual report for financial year 2024–2025, the bank's business is ₹91,814 crores. It was ranked second-best bank in India by The World's Best Banks 2020 survey conducted by the Forbes, an American business magazine.
