= Core banking =

Type of banking service

Core banking is a banking service provided by a group of networked bank branches where customers may access their bank account and perform basic transactions from any of the member branch offices.

Core banking is often associated with retail banking and many banks treat the retail customers as their core banking customers. Businesses are usually managed via the corporate banking division of the institution. Core banking covers basic depositing and lending of money and include functions such as transaction accounts, loans, mortgages and payments. Banks make these services available across multiple channels like automated teller machines, Internet banking, mobile banking and branches.

Core banking software is a key part of banking software and network technology that allows a bank to centralise its record keeping and provide core banking services.

== History ==
Core banking became possible with the advent of computer and telecommunication technology that allowed information to be shared between bank branches quickly and efficiently.

Before the 1970s it used to take at least a day for a transaction to reflect in the real account because each branch had their local servers, and the data from the server in each branch was sent in a batch to the servers in the data center only at the end of the day (EOD).

Over the following 30 years most banks moved to core banking applications to support their operations creating a Centralized Online Real-time Exchange (or Environment) (CORE). This meant that all the bank's branches could access applications from centralized data centers. Deposits made were reflected immediately on the bank's servers, and the customer could withdraw the deposited money from any of the bank's branches.

== Software ==
UML class diagram depicting a bank account

Advancements in Internet and information technology reduced manual work in banks and increased efficiency. Computer software is developed to perform core operations of banking like recording of transactions, passbook maintenance, interest calculations on loans and deposits, customer records, the balance of payments, and withdrawal. This software is installed at different branches of the bank and then interconnected by means of computer networks based on telephones, satellite and the Internet.

Gartner defines a core banking system as a back-end system that processes daily banking transactions, and posts updates to accounts and other financial records. Core banking systems typically include deposit, loan, and credit-processing capabilities, with interfaces to general ledger systems and reporting tools. Core banking applications are often one of the largest single expenses for banks and legacy software is a major issue in terms of allocating resources. Spending on these systems is based on a combination of service-oriented architecture and supporting technologies. Modern Core Banking Systems tend to follow "lean core" philosophy, where Core itself has only basic functionalities like General Ledger and transaction posting, all other services are covered by satellite applications.

Many banks implement custom applications for core banking. Others implement or customize commercial independent software vendor packages.

== Providers ==
While larger financial institutions may implement their own custom core, community banks and credit unions tend to outsource their core systems to system providers. While there is no consensus or a public register on the actual Core Banking Providers, various market research companies like Gartner or Forrester Research release annual deal surveys mentioning platform deals.
