= S. D. Shibulal =

Indian business executive (1955-)

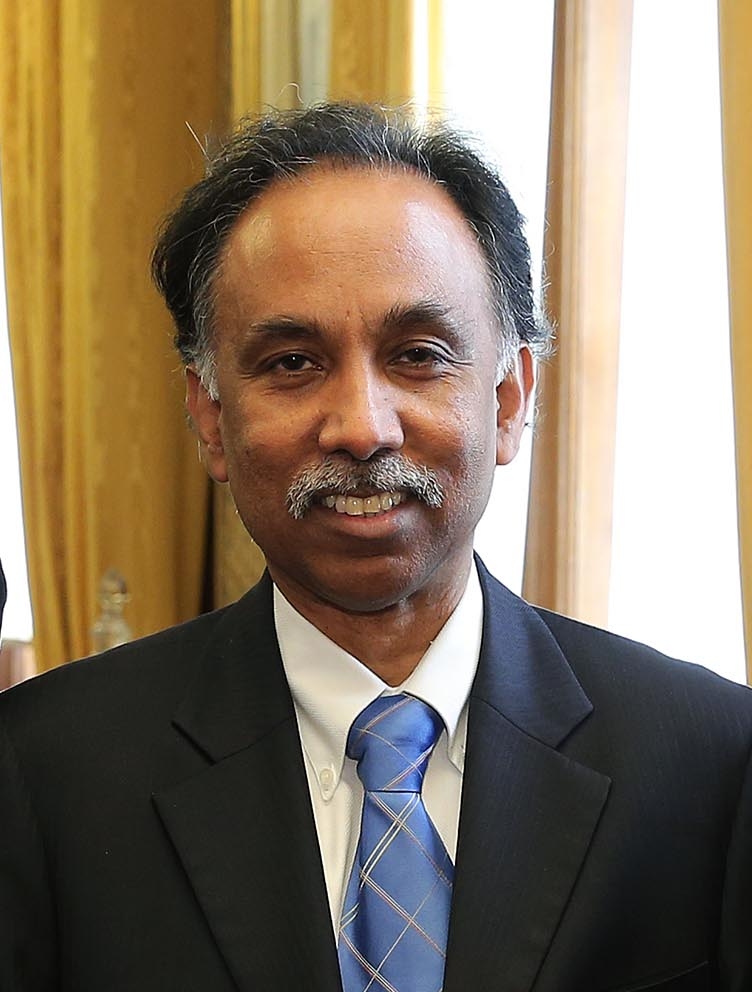
- Shibulal at the 2013 Horasis Global India Business Meeting
- Born: Sarojini Damodaran Shibulal; 1 March 1955 (age 71); Alappuzha, Travancore-Cochin, India
- Other names: Shibulal
- Education: M.Sc. (Physics); M.S. (Computer Science)
- Alma mater: Maharaja's College, Ernakulam; Boston University
- Occupations: Co-Founder, Infosys and Axilor Ventures
- Years active: 1981–present
- Employer: Infosys
- Board member of: Boston University; Globethics.net; Seoul International Business Advisory Council (SIBAC)
- Spouse: Kumari Shibulal
- Children: Daughter: Shruti & Son: Shreyas

S. D. Shibulal (born 1 March 1955), better known as Shibulal, is an Indian business executive. He was the chief executive officer and managing director of Infosys, and one of its seven founding members. He stepped down from the post of CEO and MD on 31 July 2014 and was succeeded by the first non-founder CEO of Infosys Dr. Vishal Sikka. He is the president of the Infosys Science Foundation for the year 2015.

== Early life and education ==
Shibulal, born in Alappuzha in 1955. In an interview, he was quoted in reference to his early childhood life - "I was the only child, and my parents were really keen that I stay at home and take up a teaching job.” His father, Damodaran, was an ayurvedic doctor; and mother, Sarojini, a state excise department employee. After completing schooling in T. D. High School, Alappuzha, he went to S. D. College in Alappuzha for his graduation. Upon completion, he joined Maharaja's College Ernakulam, then under University of Kerala, where he earned his M.Sc. in Physics. He obtained an M.S. degree in Computer Science from Boston University in 1987.

== Career ==
Shibulal started his career in 1979, as a software engineer, with one of India's first software company and systems integrator, Patni Computer Systems.

His Infosys journey began in 1981, when "Infosys Consultants Pvt Ltd." was co-founded on 2 July 1981 by - N. R. Narayana Murthy, Nandan Nilekani, N. S. Raghavan, S. Gopalakrishnan, K. Dinesh, Ashok Arora, and Shibulal - after they resigned from Patni. He played a pivotal role in the Infosys' journey; and his focus were its project management initiatives, followed by client relationships in North America. He was instrumental in the evolution of the Global delivery model, which established a new standard for the delivery of outsourced IT services.

Shibulal, left Infosys in 1991 for a five-year sabbatical, and joined Sun Microsystems in the US. Between 1991 and 1996, he was responsible for designing and implementing Sun's first e-commerce application. In 1997, on his return to Infosys, Shibulal established and headed the Internet Consultancy practice, which set the stage for the company’s evolution into a major global business consulting and IT services provider Shibulal held a number of senior leadership roles which include: Head of Worldwide Sales and Customer Delivery, and Head of Infosys Manufacturing and Distribution and Internet Consulting practice.

On 22 June 2007, Shibulal took over from Kris Gopalakrishnan as the Chief Operating Officer. In this role, he focused on increasing competitiveness, improving customer experience, enhancing employee engagement and increasing the depth of services. Shibulal also joined as the member of the board of directors of Infosys.

On 30 April 2011, the Infosys board announced that Shibulal was appointed as the new CEO and Managing director of the company. On 21 August 2011, he took over his new role from Kris Gopalakrishnan. Soon after taking over, Shibulal announced Infosys 3.0, the strategy that would propel Infosys into its next phase of evolution. He termed, the first 15 years of Infosys as Infosys 1.0 and the next 12–13 years as Infosys 2.0, and was quoted “This was when we innovated the global delivery model and started delivering services, predominantly applications development and maintenance,... The 12-13 years after that constituted Infosys 2.0, developing the ability to supply services that allowed clients to become much more efficient and productive.” As the chief executive officer, Shibulal is focused on strengthening strategic partnerships with clients, increasing client relevance and evolving the company’s business model towards achieving Infosys’ aspirations of becoming the next generation global consulting and IT services corporation. In April 2014 Shibulal expressed the desire to retire as its chief executive officer and managing director. On 12 June, it was announced that Shibulal would quit as CEO and MD of Infosys from 1 August 2014.

In 2014 Shibulal co-founded Axilor Ventures, a venture capital service for young entrepreneurs.

== Board memberships ==
Shibulal is a member of the board of trustees, and the Metropolitan College Dean’s Advisory Board of Boston University. He also serves on board of the foundation, Globethics.net, the Seoul International Business Advisory Council (SIBAC), and the Global Corporate Governance Forum’s Private Sector Advisory Group.

== Personal life ==
Shibulal met his wife Kumari, during his university days in SD College. The couple has two children; daughter Shruti and son Shreyas. One of his hobbies is dismantling and reassembling electronic devices to figure out how they work, and likes listening to Carnatic classical music. In a Financial Times interview in 2012, it was cited that his favourite city is New York. Shibulal, along with wife Kumari, daughter Shruti and son Shreyas, holds nearly 2.2% of Infosys shares, which is around $2.2 billion.
