= Infosys Consulting =

Management and IT consulting company

- Industry: Management consulting services
- Founded: 2004; 22 years ago.
- Headquarters: London, United Kingdom
- Area served: Globe
- Key people: Paul Dillon (CEO & Managing Partner)
- Products: Automotive, consumer packaged goods, energy, financial services, healthcare, high-tech, industrial manufacturing, insurance, life sciences, retail, telecommunication and utilities services, resources
- Services: Enterprise Change, Enterprise Design, Enterprise Insights
- Number of employees: Estimated 6,100 in 2015
- Parent: Infosys
- Website: infosys.com/consulting

Infosys Consulting is a management consulting, IT consulting practice within the larger Infosys organization which works in strategy, IT transformation, change management and business analytics. Infosys Consulting operates globally and currently has offices in 18 countries across the Americas, Asia Pacific and Europe. The firm was officially launched in 2004 as a fully owned subsidiary of Infosys chaired by N. R. Narayana Murthy, one of the co-founders of Infosys. For quarter-end March 2016 Infosys Consulting and Package Implementation were reported as 33.2% of the whole of Infosys' revenue, contributing to the reported earnings of 23 cents a share on revenue of $2.4 billion that December for Infosys.

== History ==
At its initial launch in 2004, Infosys Consulting focused on recruitment in the United States to launch programs in a Global delivery model.

In 2012, Infosys acquired Lodestone Management Consultants, based out of Zurich, Switzerland for $350m USD. Lodestone increased the Infosys Consulting client base by nearly 200 companies across different industry segments, and at the time of acquisition, Infosys’ consulting and systems-integration business contributed to 31% of total revenue. The acquisition brought on 850 new employees, with 750 being front-line consulting delivery professionals.

In 2015, Infosys Ltd decided to integrate Lodestone, at the time a subsidiary of Infosys, and the Management Consulting Services unit into the singular Infosys Consulting unit that resides within Infosys Limited.

In 2015, Infosys acquired Noah Consulting LLC for $70m USD. Noah Consulting is based out of Houston, Texas and primarily serves customers in the oil and gas industry, providing information and technology services. As of September 2017, it was unclear whether the brand would be a subsidiary or merged into the larger Infosys Consulting.

After three-years as interim CEO of Infosys, Dr. Vishal Sikka resigned in August 2017. In a personal note to board colleagues, he cited a 'drumbeat of distractions' and "false, baseless, malicious and increasingly personal attacks" as his reason for leaving Infosys. Anonymous employees of the company were quoted in the press as saying that this was due to a long-running feud with Infosys' founders over the new direction Sikka was reportedly taking Infosys. The current director and CEO is Salil Parekh, former executive at Capgemini business consultancy.

In 2020, Infosys made an alliance with Avaloq to improve wealth management capability across digital channels.

== See also ==
- Information technology consulting
- Management consulting
- Outline of consulting
