= Cosmos Co-operative Bank =

Banking institution in India

Cosmos Co-operative Bank Ltd.
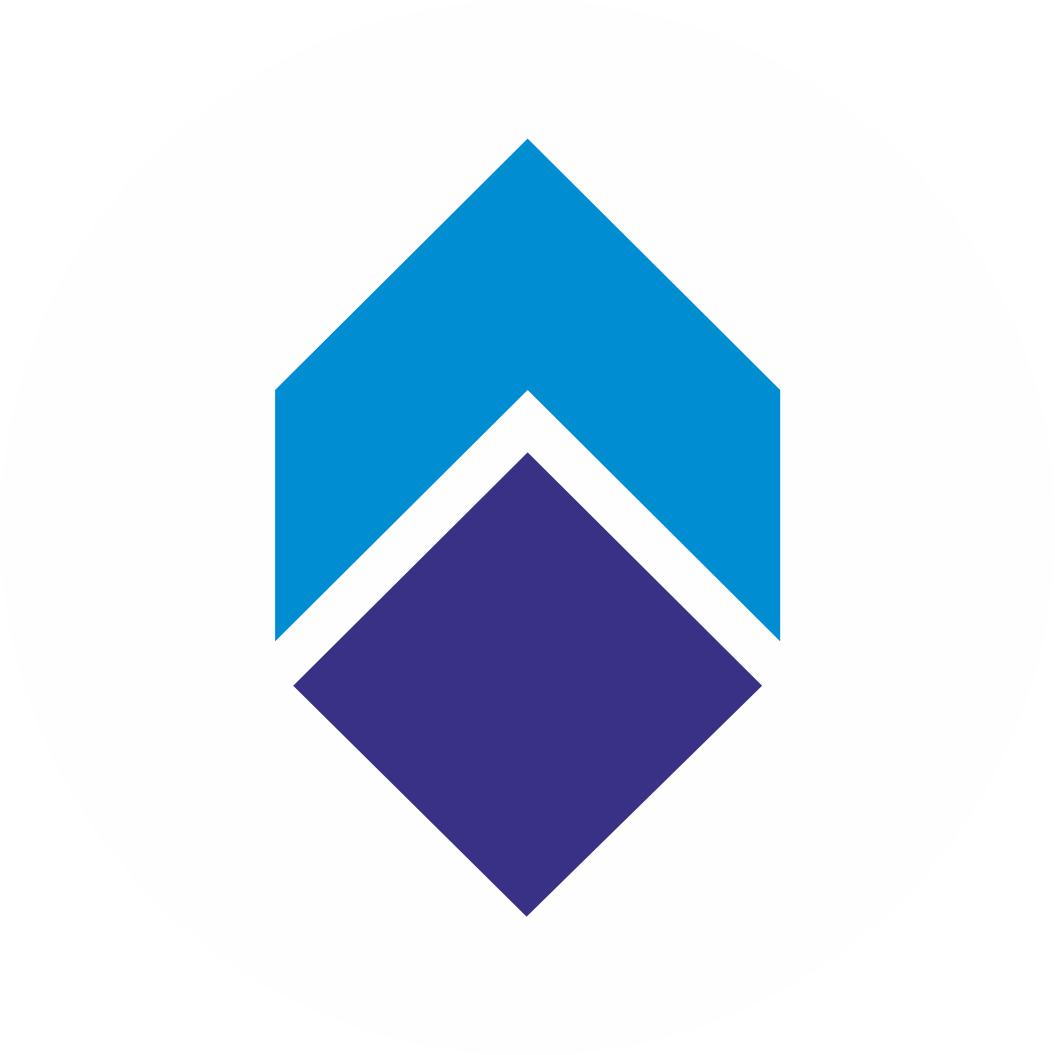
- Company type: Multi State Co-operative Bank
- Industry: Financial services
- Founded: 1906
- Founder: N.C. Kelkar
- Headquarters: Pune, India
- Products: Commercial banking Retail banking Private banking
- Revenue: ▲₹3,790.8 million (US$40 million) (2020)
- Net income: ▼₹−543.4 million (US$−5.7 million) (2020)
- Number of employees: 2,714 (2020)
- Website: Official Website

The Cosmos Co-operative Bank Ltd. (Cosmos Bank), established in 1906, is one of the oldest Urban Co-operative Banks in India. Cosmos Bank celebrated its centenary on 18 January 2006. It is one of the first co-operative banks in the country to implement Core Banking System (CBS) across the entire network of its then 140 service outlets using Finacle-Infosys Core Banking Software. It also received an authorized dealer (AD) license from the Reserve Bank of India to become the third co-operative bank in India to have such a license in thirty years.

The bank is headquartered in Pune in its Corporate Office at Cosmos Tower, Ganeshkhind Road, Shivajinagar, Pune.

This bank was founded on 18 January 1906 in Pune by Krishnaji Sadashiv Gore and Shankar Hari Barve. The first Chairman of the Cosmos Bank was Sahitya Samrat N.C. Kelkar alias Tatyasaheb Kelkar. On 1 December 1990, Cosmos Bank received the Scheduled status and within a short span of just 7 years, on 28 November 1997 the Bank was awarded the 'Multi-State' status. The Cosmos Bank is operative in 7 States of India, viz., Maharashtra, Gujarat, Madhya Pradesh, Karnataka, Andhra Pradesh, Telangana and Tamil Nadu through its 140 branches. Bank has more than 2 Millions customers and 79,000 shareholders.

Cosmos Bank is the first bank in co-operative sector to be granted permission to operate a Currency Chest. Cosmos Bank has a Currency Chest in Pune, offering services to other banks in Pune.

== Branches ==
Cosmos Bank has in total 5 regional offices with 140 service outlets in India. These are spread across 7 states and in 39 major Indian cities. Those are as follows:

- Andhra Pradesh: Vijayawada
- Gujarat: Ahmedabad, Ankleshwar, Baroda, Bhavnagar, Bhuj, Gandhidham, Rajkot, Surat
- Karnataka: Bangalore, Belgaum, Nipani
- Madhya Pradesh: Indore, Annapurna Branch
- Maharashtra:Amravati, Aurangabad, Baramati, Bhusawal, Jalgaon, Jalna, Kolhapur, Mumbai, Nagpur, Nashik, Phaltan, Pune, Sangli, Satara, Solapur, Thane, Yavatmal
- Tamil Nadu: Chennai, Coimbatore
- Telangana: Hyderabad, Secundarabad

== See also ==
- Banking in India
