= Arghyam =

Indian non-profit organisation

- Arghyam Foundation
- Formation: 2001
- Founder: Rohini Nilekani
- Founded at: Bengaluru, Karnataka, India
- Type: Nonprofit organization
- Legal status: Active
- Purpose: Water and sanitation
- Headquarters: Bengaluru, Karnataka, India
- Region served: India
- Methods: Grantmaking, fellowship, research, and policy support in water and sanitation, Partnerships with governments agencies and NGOs
- Fields: Water, sanitation, groundwater management
- Chairperson: Sunita Nadhamuni
- Founder: Rohini Nilekani
- Key people: Anuj Sharma (CEO)
- Funding: Endowment by founder
- Endowment: ₹150 crore
- Website: https://arghyam.org/

The Arghyam or Arghyam Foundation is an Indian non-profit organisation based in Bengaluru, Karnataka, that works in the water and sanitation sector. It was established in 2001 by Rohini Nilekani. The organisation works on issues related to groundwater, water quality and sanitation, in rural and urban areas, supporting programmes that address water access and management in India. The foundation operates with an endowment of ₹150 crore provided by its founder.

Some of its major initiatives include the India Water Portal, which it operates as an online resource on water-related issues, and the Participatory Groundwater Management (PGWM) programme, which supports communities in managing local groundwater resources.

== History ==
Arghyam was founded in 2001 as a grantmaking foundation. It was set up by former journalist and philanthropist Rohini Nilekani with a personal endowment to support initiatives in the water and sanitation sector in India. Its name is derived from Sanskrit and refers to an 'offering'. It supported several initiatives before focusing on water-related work from 2005. In 2005, following the issuance of American depositary receipt by Infosys, Nilekani contributed ₹100 crore to establish a corpus for Arghyam, and later added ₹50 crore, bringing the total endowment to ₹150 crore.

In 2008, the foundation supported the installation of rainwater harvesting systems in flood-prone areas of northern Bihar, where monsoon flooding displaces residents to canal embankments, to provide safe drinking water. By 2010, the organisation supported around 30–40 projects through grants to NGOs across India.

In 2008–09, it conducted the ASHWAS (A Survey of Household Water and Sanitation) in Karnataka, covering approximately 17,200 households across 172 gram panchayats in 28 districts. The survey assessed water supply, sanitation conditions, and user perceptions, and its findings were intended to inform policy and planning.

In late 2010, Arghyam was invited by the Planning Commission of India to compile inputs from civil society organisations on drinking water and sanitation for inclusion in the approach paper to the 12th Five-Year Plan.

In 2012, Arghyam partnered with Inner Voice Foundation on a programme addressing arsenic contamination in drinking water in Ballia district of Uttar Pradesh and Bhojpur district of Bihar. The initiative focused on improving access to safe water and strengthening community participation through awareness and capacity-building activities. It also included periodic testing of water sources using field kits and coordination with state agencies such as the Jal Nigam and the Public Health Engineering Department.

The foundation has supported a number of initiatives in participatory groundwater management, working with partner organisations across different regions in India. These efforts have typically been implemented through multiple projects running simultaneously at the local level. Arghyam has also supported interventions related to rainwater harvesting, restoration of traditional water bodies, and the development of local water security plans.

In 2025, the foundation collaborated with the Government of India's Jal Jeevan Mission and Swachh Bharat Mission, in partnership with the Dr. Syama Prasad Mookerjee National Institute of Water and Sanitation, to design digital ecosystems for water service delivery and infrastructure maintenance.

Arghyam provides grants to non-governmental organisations, research institutions, and government agencies working on water and sanitation projects in India. The foundation provided a grant of ₹1.19 crore to support the Government of India's Nirmal Bharat Abhiyan in Karnataka for the construction of household toilets, and ₹60.67 lakh for the Mazhapolima programme in Kerala, a decentralised well recharge initiative.

== Initiatives ==
=== India Water Portal ===
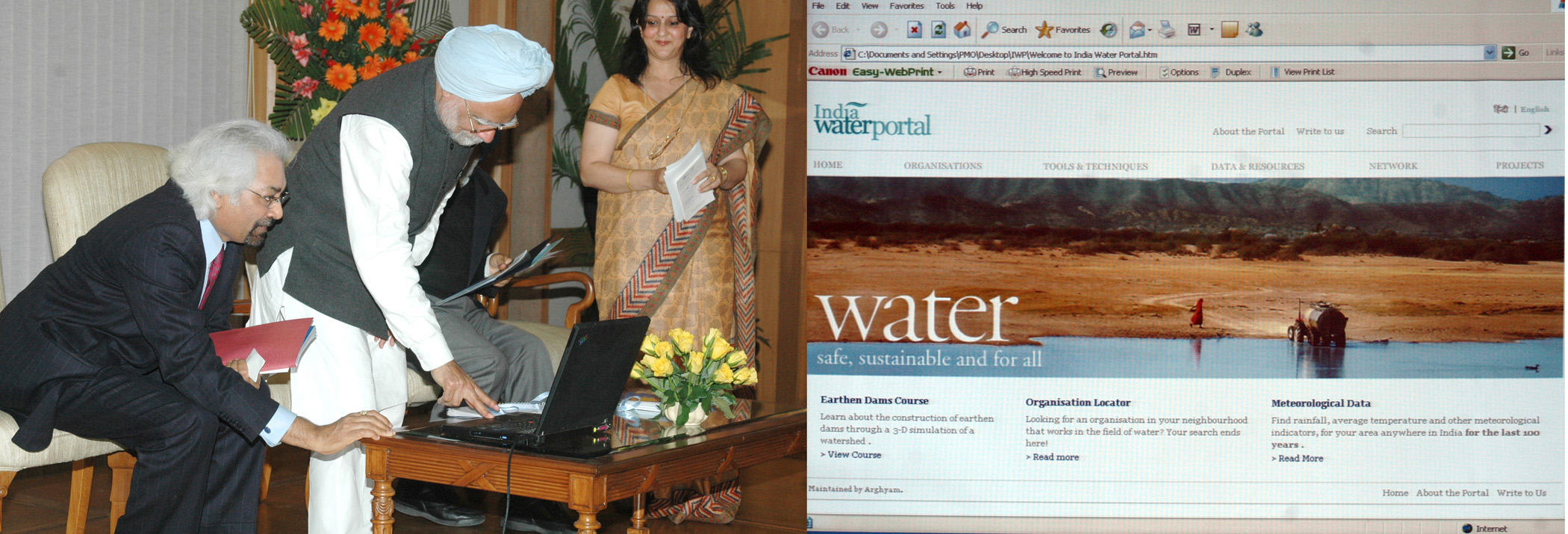
PM Manmohan Singh launches the India Water Portal in New Delhi on 12 January 2007, with Sam Pitroda, Chairman of the National Knowledge Commission, and Rohini Nilekani, founder of Arghyam.

In 2007, Arghyam, with the support of the National Knowledge Commission, developed the India Water Portal, a web-based platform launched on 12 January 2007 by then Prime Minister of India, Manmohan Singh, as a public resource for water-related information in India. The portal was intended to serve as a centralised repository of data, research, and case studies on water management. The portal is available in English and Hindi, and a Kannada version was later launched.

It provides information on areas such as groundwater management, rainwater harvesting, water quality, sanitation, and watershed development, and includes historical meteorological data relevant to water resource planning. The platform was designed to enable knowledge-sharing among practitioners, researchers, and the public, and has been described as a resource for media and policy discussions on water issues in India.

=== PGWM ===
Arghyam's Participatory Groundwater Management (PGWM) programme, launched in 2011, focuses on community-based approaches to groundwater management in India. In collaboration with technical partners such as the Advanced Center for Water Resources Development and Management (ACWADAM), the programme trains local communities to map aquifers across different geological settings. As of 2017, the model had been implemented in over 500 locations, including areas such as Anantapur in Andhra Pradesh and Randullabad in Maharashtra. Arghyam's PGWM programme was referenced in India's 12th Five-Year Plan, in relation to aquifer mapping. It has also been cited in discussions on institutional reforms of the Central Ground Water Board.

=== CLART ===
In 2014, in collaboration with the Foundation for Ecological Security (FES), Arghyam supported the development of CLART (Composite Landscape Assessment and Restoration Tool), a GIS-based Android application designed to assist rural workers in planning soil and moisture conservation works.

The tool enables scientific planning by providing color-coded maps of groundwater recharge potential based on local lithology and slope. Designed to function offline for use in remote areas, CLART has been integrated into the planning process for the MGNREGA in several states, including Odisha and Chhattisgarh, to ensure that water conservation labor is deployed in geologically appropriate zones.

=== JalSoochak ===
In April 2026, Arghyam launched JalSoochak, a digital tool for monitoring rural water service delivery, at an event in Bengaluru. The tool was developed in collaboration with the Public Health Engineering Department, Government of Assam. JalSoochak facilitates the collection of data on water supply through a mobile-based interface, enabling the recording and aggregation of operational information related to water distribution.

== Leadership ==
Rohini Nilekani, the founder of Arghyam, served as its chairperson from 2001 until her retirement on 30 September 2021, having announced her decision to step down in June 2021. She was succeeded by Sunita Nadhamuni, who assumed the role of chairperson on 1 October 2021. Nadhamuni had previously served as a trustee and as Arghyam's first chief executive officer in 2005.

== Awards and recognition ==
Arghyam received the Social Enterprise of the Year award at the India Leadership Conclave & Indian Affairs Business Leadership Awards in 2014, held in Mumbai. It has been the subject of a case study published in the Stanford Social Innovation Review in 2017.

Another case study on Arghyam was published in 2023 by the Indian School of Development Management and the Centre for Social Impact and Philanthropy at Ashoka University.

In the report "Emerging Philanthropy in India: Analysis of Gaps and Recommended Interventions" by the National Foundation for India, funded by the Rockefeller Foundation, Arghyam was described as the only foundation among those studied to publicly disclose its spending information and as one of the few Indian philanthropic organisations with a clearly articulated strategic approach to development interventions.
