= Nilekani =

Nilekani is a surname. Notable people with the surname include:

- Nandan Nilekani, Indian entrepreneur
- Rohini Nilekani (born 1960), Indian writer and philanthropist, wife of Nandan
