= Henson Tsai =

Hong Kong businessman

- Citizenship: Hong Kong
- Education: Imperial College London (BSc, Mathematics with Statistics for Finance, 2017
- Occupations: Entrepreneur, business executive
- Known for: Founder and CEO of SleekFlow

Henson Tsai is a Hong Kong-based entrepreneur who is the founder and chief executive officer of SleekFlow, a Singapore-headquartered omnichannel conversational customer experience (CX) AI software.

== Early life & education ==
Henson Tsai was born and raised in Hong Kong. He received a Bachelor of Science degree in mathematics with a Statistics for Finance from Imperial College London in 2017. During his studies, he developed a smart-home software application that won an internal start-up competition at the university.

== Career ==
Henson Tsai started his career at HSBC and later he worked as a management consultant at Ernst & Young.

Tsai's first venture, TasteOut, was an online food-takeaway ordering platform, built with two engineers who later built SleekFlow with him as founding members. The team subsequently pivoted the concept into an all-in-one communication app for hotel concierge services, and after further customer feedback pivoted again toward a messaging-based e-commerce platform for retail and e-commerce businesses.

Tsai founded SleekFlow in 2019. SleekFlow is an AI suite for B2C conversations, that consolidates channels such as Facebook Messenger, WhatsApp Business API, Instagram, SMS, VoIP, email and Telegram into a single interface.

== Recognition ==
- 2023 Forbes Asia 30 Under 30, Enterprise Technology category
- 2023 Tatler Asia Gen.T Leaders of Tomorrow, Hong Kong
