= Government Model Boys Higher Secondary School =

Coordinates: 8.492813°N 76.955355°E

Government Model Boys Higher Secondary School, Thiruvananthapuram
- Thiruvananthapuram, Kerala; India

Information
- Type: Higher secondary school
- Motto: Thamasoma jyothirgamaya
- Established: 1885
- Locale: Thaikkadu
- Enrollment: 2000
- Education system: Kerala State Board of Education
- Classes offered: Std 5 to 12

Government Model Boys Higher Secondary School, previously called Government Model High School, is a school in Thycaud, Thiruvananthapuram, India. The school is affiliated to the Kerala State Board of Education and is one of the oldest schools in Kerala.

== History ==
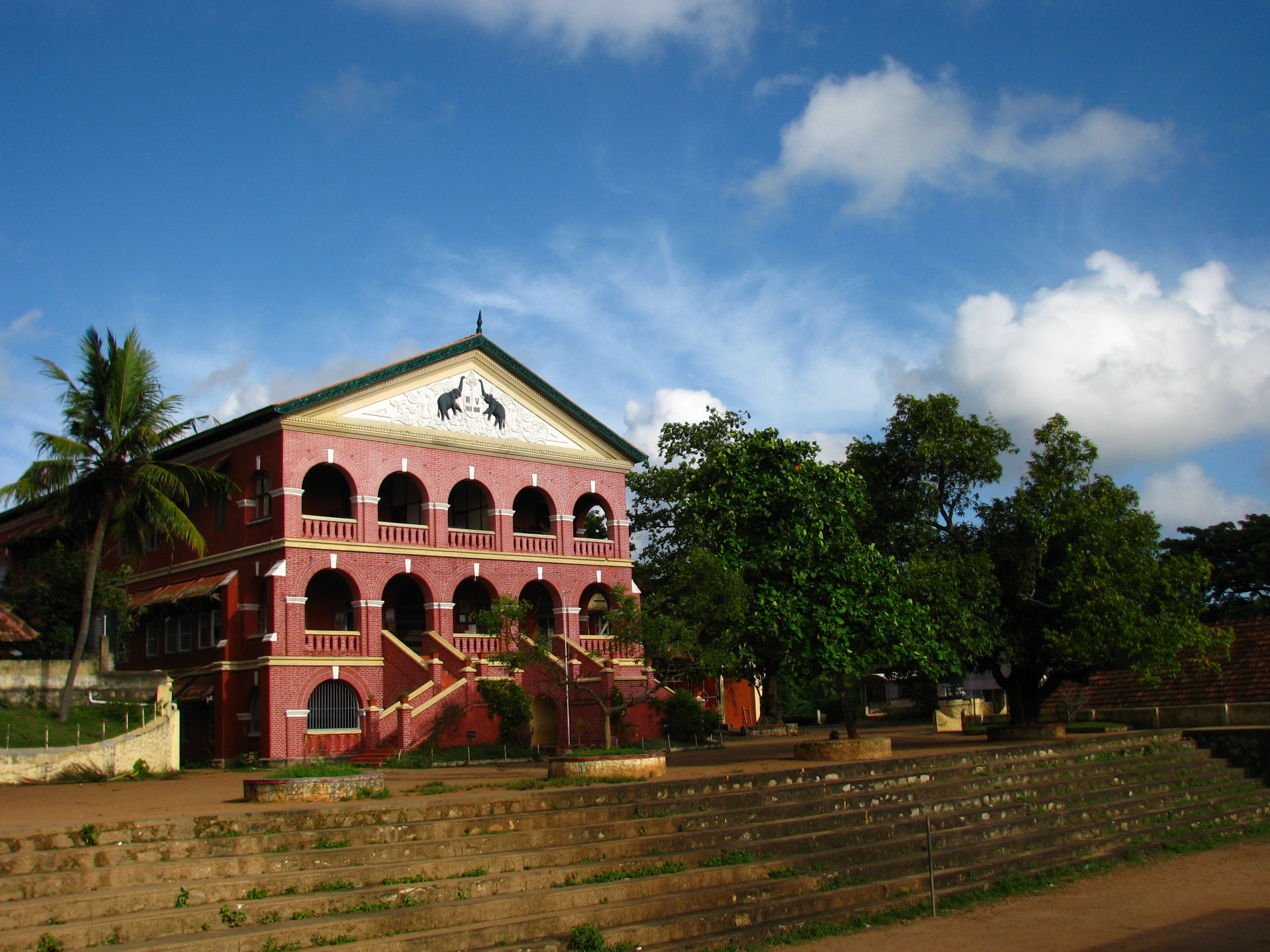
The school

In 1885, a normal school was started in Thiruvananthapuram by the government of Travancore for training male teachers. It was situated in the compound where St.Joseph's Higher Secondary school is at present. In 1903 it was shifted to Thycaud. The magnificent main building of the school, an example of European architecture, was built in 1910 during the reign of Maharaja Sree Moolam Thirunal Ramavarma.

The first headmaster was Dr. C F Clarke who served for three years. He lived on the school campus; the house where he stayed remains as Clarke's Bungalow. One of the earliest headmasters of the training college was Shri. P.G. Sadasiva Iyer, who was an M.A. in Chemistry from the Madras Presidency college. The school was the city's first English, Malayalam, Tamil medium school.

=== Higher secondary school ===
When the Kerala State Board of Education decided to move the two-year intermediate course (the course between high school and university) from colleges to schools in 1998, Model School was part of the program. As part of this change, the name of the school was changed to Government Model Higher Secondary School.

== Notable alumni ==
- Dr. A. Marthanda Pillai, neurosurgeon, the recipient of a Padma Shri and managing director of Ananthapuri Hospitals & Research Institute
- Babu Divakaran, a politician and a former Kerala state minister
- Balabhaskar, was an Indian musician, violinist, composer and record producer
- G. Venugopal, playback singer
- Jagadish, actor, screenwriter, television presenter, and politician
- Jagathy Sreekumar, actor
- K. B. Ganesh Kumar, actor, television host, and politician. He was the Minister for Forests & Environment, Sports and Cinema in the Government of Kerala
- K. Muraleedharan, a politician and a former Kerala state minister
- Kris Gopalakrishnan, co-founder and former executive vice chairman (former co-chairman) of Infosys, former president of Confederation of Indian Industry, chairman of Axilor Ventures
- M. G. Radhakrishnan, music director and Carnatic vocalist
- M. G. Sreekumar, playback singer, composer, music producer, television presenter and film producer
- M. P. Appan, a poet and littérateur
- Maniyanpilla Raju, actor and producer
- Mohanlal, actor, producer and a recipient of Padma Bhushan
- Nalini Netto, was a student of the primary section and a former chief secretary, Government of Kerala
- Priyadarshan, film director, screenwriter, and producer
- Rajeevnath, film director
- S. Krishna Kumar, a politician and former union minister of India
- Shaji Kailas, film director and scriptwriter
- Sri Madhukarnath, spiritual guide, social reformer, educationist and a recipient of Padma Bhushan
- Srinivas, playback singer
- Sukumar (writer), a popular satirist and cartoonist
- U. Vimal Kumar, former international Badminton player and served as chief national coach of India
- Venu Nagavally, film actor, screenwriter and director
- Vishnu Vijay, music producer, music director, flautist, and composer
- R Raghupathi Pai, Indian Musician
