= Time2 =

- Company type: Private
- Industry: Retail
- Headquarters: Blackburn, Lancashire, United Kingdom
- Key people: Trevor Brown (Director); Jaquelin M. Conway (Secretary); Thomas D. Conway (Director); Anesh Sadasivan Pillai (Director)
- Website: www.time2technology.com

Time2 is a UK-based multichannel retailer which manufactures security cameras, tablets, and smart home devices.

In 2014, the brand expanded into continental Europe through European Amazon platforms as well as deal sites in Ireland and across the continent.
