= Media Process Outsourcing =

Outsourcing related to media and entertainment companies

Media process outsourcing (MPO) is a subset of outsourcing, providing a range of services to media and entertainment companies globally. Cost savings and availability of skilled manpower remain the prime drivers pushing the popularity of the industry.

With the mega media corporations witnessing a major media landscape change, the need for content distribution is at peak and requires multi-channel strategy for an effective and cost efficient supply, increasing the demand for high quality media process outsourcing. However the long term scope of the industry is not limited to a single process, but includes developing strategic means of achieving economies of scale and standardization across the industry.

Though Media process outsourcing is fairly a young industry, it is poised for high growth expected to create demand for specific media services like subtitle (captioning) for TV shows and movies, closed captioning, graphics and animation, video editing, media audit reporting and even transmission.

Also, the scope of Media Process Outsourcing has shifted from cost rationalization and service management to strategic outsourcing in the form of core business models. Big outsourcing players like Genpact (with its NGEN media joint venture with NDTV) and Infosys BPO Limited (with its Source18 joint venture with TV18) have already joined the fray to make the most out of it.
