= Vishal Sikka =

Indian businessman (born 1967)

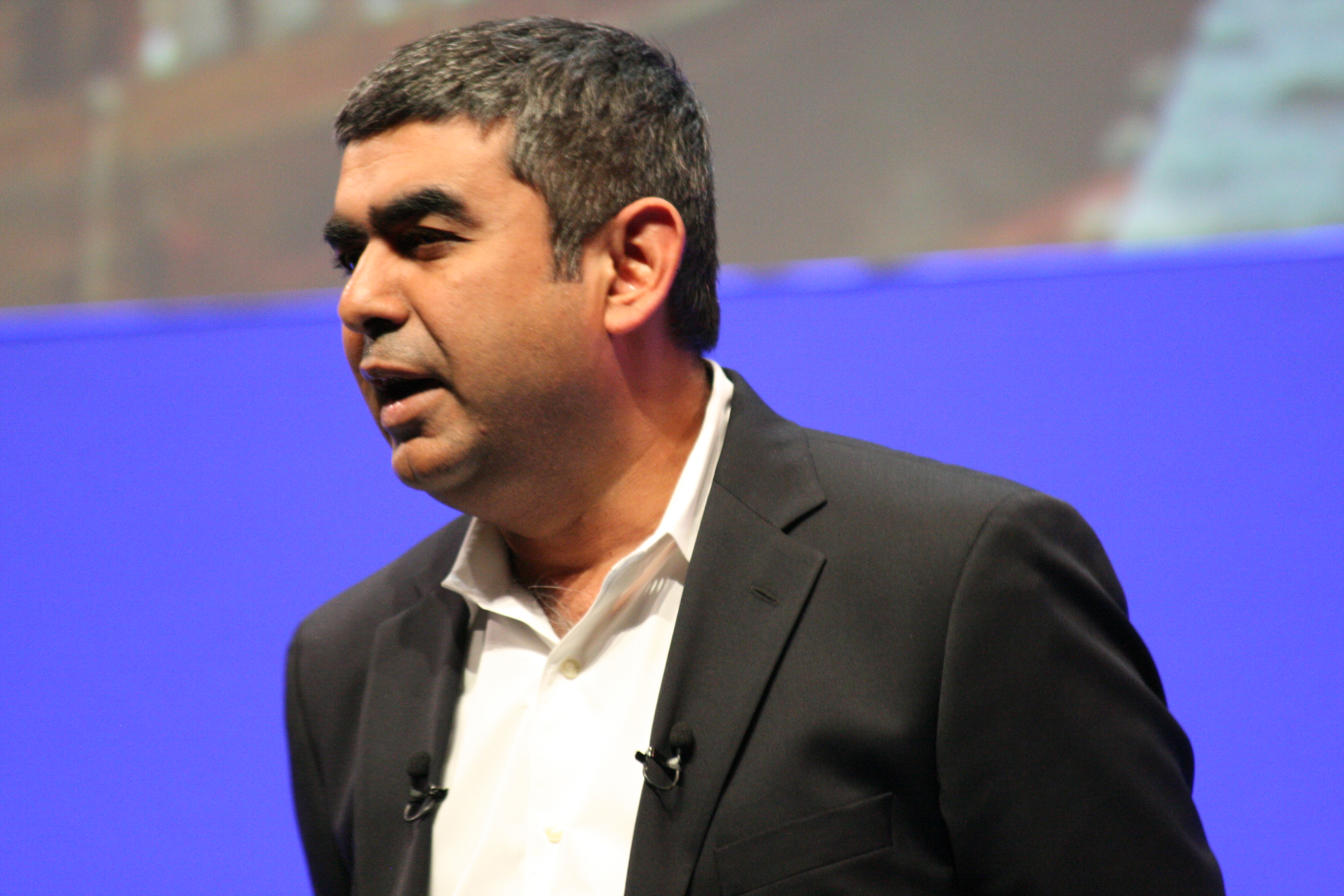
- Sikka in 2010
- Born: 1 May 1967 (age 59); Shajapur, Madhya Pradesh, India
- Education: Stanford University (Ph.D. in Computer Science); Syracuse University (B.S. in Computer Science); Rosary High School (Vadodara)
- Known for: Founder and CEO of Vianai Systems

Vishal Sikka (born 1 May 1967) is an American entrepreneur who is the founder and CEO of Vianai and was CTO of SAP AG and CEO of Infosys. He is on Oracle's board of directors, the supervisory board of the BMW Group and as an advisor to the Stanford Institute of Human-Centered AI.

His current endeavor, Vianai, is a startup based in San Francisco that provides software services in artificial intelligence and machine learning.

Previously, Sikka was executive vice chairman, CEO, and managing director of Infosys. Prior to joining Infosys, Sikka was a member of the executive board and the global managing board of SAP AG, leading all SAP products and innovation worldwide. After three years at Infosys, Sikka left on 18 August 2017.

In 2017, India Today magazine ranked him #32nd in India's 50 Most powerful people list.

== Early life and education ==
Sikka was born in Shajapur, Madhya Pradesh, India to Punjabi parents - an officer in the Indian Railways and a teacher. His family moved to Vadodara in Gujarat when he was six. He did his schooling in Kendriya Vidyalaya, Rajkot and thereafter at a Christian school named Rosary High School (Vadodara).

Sikka joined the bachelors in Computer Engineering course at Maharaja Sayajirao University of Baroda, which he discontinued to go to Syracuse University in New York where he earned a B.S. in Computer Science. He completed his Ph.D. in 1996 from Stanford University. His dissertation was titled Integrating Specialized Procedures into Proof Systems and his thesis advisor was Michael Genesereth.

Marvin Minsky, one of the fathers of AI, wrote a recommendation letter for Sikka for his admission to Stanford. John McCarthy, also known as a father of AI, was one of Sikka's professors.

== Career ==
After a brief stint at Xerox's research labs, Sikka founded iBrain which competed at the time with Business Objects. iBrain was acquired by PatternRX, Inc. His second startup, Bodha.com, focused on developing technology for non-invasive, service-based integration of enterprise applications and information. Sikka joined Peregrine Systems as their area vice-president following their acquisition of Bodha.com.

=== SAP ===
Sikka joined SAP in 2002 to head up the advanced technology group responsible for strategic innovative projects. Later he was promoted to senior vice president of architecture and chief software architect, responsible for the road map and the direction for the architecture of SAP products and infrastructure.

In April 2007, Sikka was named SAP's first-ever CTO, reporting to then CEO Henning Kagermann. At the time, SAP spokesman Frank Hartmann stated that SAP felt it needed a CTO to oversee some broad changes that were under way at the company, including its renewed focus on the mid-market, the introduction of new on-demand products, and the continued roll out of NetWeaver and its SOA strategy.

In the wake of Léo Apotheker's resignation from the executive board in 2010 to become CEO of HP, Sikka was named to a newly reconstituted board, along with new co-CEOs Bill McDermott and Jim Hagemann Snabe.

On 4 May 2014, Sikka announced his departure from SAP after being named leader of Infosys.

Sikka was named to Oracle's board of directors in December 2019.

=== Infosys ===
On 12 June 2014, Infosys Ltd, India's second-largest IT services exporter, named Sikka as its chief executive officer and managing director. Sikka took over from then-CEO S.D. Shibulal, one of Infosys' founders, on 1 August. He was inducted as a whole-time director of the Board and CEO & MD (Designate) of Infosys on 14 June.

In December 2015, while CEO and managing director of Infosys, Sikka announced that Infosys pledged support to the newly formed non-profit artificial intelligence research organisation OpenAI, and Sikka was listed as one of OpenAI's advisers.

His annual compensation was set at $13 million and stock options worth $9million. Vishal Sikka resigned from Infosys as MD and CEO on 18 August 2017. He was replaced on interim basis by U. B. Pravin Rao on 24 August 2017.

On 18 August 2017 he stepped down as managing director of Infosys. He left his role as executive vice chairman of Infosys on 24 August 2017 when Nandan Nilekani was appointed as the new non-executive chairman of the board.

=== Vianai ===
In 2019, Sikka founded Vianai, an AI company, with $50 million in initial funding and advisors that included Indra Nooyi, John Etchemendy, Divesh Makan, Sebastian Thrun, and Alan Kay.

During a platform demo on September 17, 2019, Sikka said that Vianai had created its own programming language to enable more developers and companies to utilize AI and Machine Learning techniques.

== Other roles and interests ==
In 2008, Sikka joined the executive board of the CTO Forum, an industry non-profit community.

He has expressed his admiration for industry visionary Alan Kay and contributed a chapter to Points of View, a tribute on Kay's 70th birthday.

Sikka was a member of the advisory board for Coghead from 2006 to 2009. Coghead was acquired by SAP in 2009.

Sikka has been an advocate for SAP HANA, SAP's in-memory database technology. He spearheaded the development of HANA since his appointment as CTO with support from Hasso Plattner.
