= Panaya =

Israeli software company

- Company type: Subsidiary
- Industry: Enterprise software
- Founded: 2006 in Ra'anana, Israel
- Founder: Yossi Cohen
- Headquarters: Hod Hasharon, Israel
- Area served: Worldwide
- Key people: David Binny (CEO)
- Services: Software as a service
- Number of employees: 240
- Parent: Infosys
- Website: www.panaya.com

Panaya is a global technology company based in Hod Hasharon, Israel. The company is a subsidiary of Infosys, and has offices in North America, Europe and Japan. It is a SaaS (software as a service) based company offering change impact analysis and cloud-based testing for packaged applications, focusing on enterprise resource planning (ERP) and customer relationship management (CRM) software systems.

== History ==
Panaya was founded in 2006 as ChangeSoft Technologies by entrepreneur Yossi Cohen. It was originally headquartered in Ra'anana, Israel. A first patent on Panaya's technology was published in 2009, followed by a continuation in 2012. In 2010, shares of Tamares Group, a private equity investment firm based in Vaduz, Liechtenstein, were acquired by Panaya as part of fundraising round.

In 2012, CGI Group, a Canadian multinational information technology (IT) consulting company, announced the launching of a new Panaya Practice. In 2013 and 2014, Panaya laid off around 20% of the company. In June 2014, Deloitte and Panaya announced an agreement to provide Oracle E-business Suite customers the ability to reduce the cost and risk of application change projects. In February 2015, Infosys announced the acquisition of Panaya for a reported $200 million. As part of a few strategic moves to pivot the company, in 2017 Panaya launched Test Dynamix, an end-to-end smart test management platform for ERP and Enterprise Package Applications that enables seamless collaboration between IT and Business teams. In 2019, Panaya expanded its portfolio to support Salesforce market with the launch of the product ForeSight. In June 2019 the company appointment David Binny as CEO. In 2021, Panaya release Change Intelligence Platform, SaaS platform that shows organizations the impact of every upgrade, updates or added feature on their ERP or CRM, Such as of SAP, Oracle E-Business Suite and Salesforce systems. In 2022 the company launched Change Analysis add-on to enhance the Panaya Test Dynamix solution with AI-Powered capability that optimizes testing cycles and mitigate risks. In 2022, Panaya appointed Tal Arnon as new VP of R&D and in 2023 they appointed Stav Grinshpon as the new CPO.

== Investors ==
Gemini Partners and Benchmark Capital were the first investors to fund Panaya with $5 million in April 2006. In August 2009, Panaya secured $5 million funding in a series B investment round led by Tamares Group with the participation of Benchmark Capital. In June 2010, in a series C round, Battery Ventures, Benchmark and Tamares Group, invested a further $7 million. In September 2010, HPV, the venture capital fund of Hasso Plattner, co-founder of SAP AG, invested $6 million in exchange for company's stakes. Shares held by the Tamares Group, a private equity investment firm based in Vaduz, Liechtenstein, were acquired by HPV together with existing investors Benchmark Capital and Battery ventures.

In 2013, the existing investors, in a series D funding round led by Battery Ventures and joined by Benchmark Capital and HPV, injected an additional $16 million into Panaya. In January 2015, Panaya secured $20 million funding in a series E investment round led by Israel Growth Partners. The company has raised $59 million to date.

== Awards and recognition ==
- 2011 : Red Herring Top Global 100 Tech Startup
- 2013 : Deloitte Technology Fast 50 List
- 2020 : Ranking within Best HighTech Companies to work for 2020, Duns 100.
- 2021 : Ranking within Best HighTech Companies to work for 2021, Duns 100.
- 2022 : Ranking within Best HighTech Companies to work for 2022, Duns 100.
- 2023 : Ranking within Best HighTech Companies to work for 2023, Duns 100.
