= Foundation for Ecological Security =

Indian nonprofit organization

- Founded: 2001
- Location: Tamilnadu
- Region served: Tirupur
- Key people: Mahavishnu
- Employees: Around 15
- Website: fes.org.in

The Foundation for Ecological Security (FES) is a registered non-profit organization based in Anand, Gujarat, India, working towards the ecological restoration and conservation of land and water resources in ecologically fragile, degraded, and marginalized regions of India through the concentrated and collective efforts of village communities.

FES has been involved in assisting in the restoration, management, and governance of common property land resources since 1986. The organization uses a holistic approach to resource management by intertwining principles of nature conservation and local self-governance in order to accelerate ecological restoration, as well as improve the living conditions of the poor.

Most of FES's efforts are concentrated in the dryland regions of the country; however, the landscapes worked on are as diverse as scrublands, tidal mudflats, dense forests, ravines, grasslands, farm fields, and water bodies.

== Mission ==
Registered under the Societies Registration Act XXI 1860, the Foundation for Ecological Security was set up in 2001 to strengthen the "massive and critical task of ecological restoration" and improve the governance of natural resources in India.

According to their website, the mission statement of the organization is, "As 'ecological security' is the foundation of sustainable and equitable development, the Foundation for Ecological Security (FES) is committed to strengthening, reviving or restoring, where necessary, the process of ecological succession and the conservation of land, forest and water resources in the country."

== Outreach ==
As of March 2022, FES and Partner NGOs collaborate with 41,880 village institutions, improving environmental stewardship of 12.52 million acres of common lands, impacting 24.8 million lives across 14 Indian states: Andhra Pradesh, Chhattisgarh, Gujarat, Himachal Pradesh, Jharkhand, Karnataka, Madhya Pradesh, Maharashtra, Manipur, Meghalaya, Nagaland, Odisha, Rajasthan, and Telangana.

The central theme of the work done by FES revolves around intertwining principles of nature conservation and strengthening village institutions so as to directly improve the living conditions of the poor and the marginalized. FES support Panchayats and their subcommittees, Village Forest Committees, Gramya Jungle Committees, Water Users Associations, and Watershed Committees. Regardless of the form of the institution, FES strives for a future where local village communities determine and move towards desirable land-use based on principles of conservation and social justice.

== Networking and collaborations ==
FES collaborates with several practitioners and academic bodies engaged in ecological restoration, community institutions, and rural livelihoods.

FES partners with the Dakshin Foundation to publish Common Voices and Current Conservation. With Kalpavriksh, FES brings out the Protected Area Update and Forest Case Update.

In collaboration with Collective Action and Property Rights (CAPRI), FES seeks to advance common interests on collective action and property rights of communities through developing effective advocacy, communication, and training materials.

FES collaborates with different universities: Washington University in St. Louis, to study subjects related to systems dynamics, energy conservation, coupled human and natural systems; Clemson University, on hydrological studies; University of Michigan, Ann Arbor, and University of Illinois Urbana-Champaign, on forest resource institutions and climate change.

FES anchors the Rain-fed Livestock Network (RLN), a consortium of NGOs which works to highlight issues related to livestock rearers in rain-fed areas of India. FES is also a member of the 'Future of Conservation' consortium, and the Revitalization of the Rain-fed Agricultural Network.

FES is currently a member of the International Union for Conservation of Nature International Land Coalition, International Association for the Study on the Commons, International Society of Ecological Economics (ISEE) and its Indian chapter, the Indigenous and Community Conserved Areas (ICCA) Consortium, and the United Nations Economic and Social Council.

== Funding partners ==
FES has been supported by many funding partners over the years, including Arghyam, Concern Worldwide, The Duleep Matthai Nature Conservation Trust, Fondation Ensemble, Ford Foundation, Department of Rural Development (Government of Andhra Pradesh), Department of Rural Development (Government of Gujarat), Department of Rural Development (Government of Rajasthan), Grow-Trees, Hilton Foundation, Irrigation, and Command Area Development (I&CAD) Department (Government of Andhra Pradesh), ITC – Sunehra Kal Initiative, National Bank for Agriculture and Rural Development (NABARD), Omidyar Network, Royal Bank of Scotland Foundation, Rufford Small Grant Programme, Sir Dorabji Tata Trust and the Allied Trusts (SDTT), Jamsetji Tata Trust (JTT), Sir Ratan Tata Trust (SRTT), Water and Sanitation Management Organisation (WASMO), UNDP-GEF Small Grants Programme (SGP), and GIZ.

== Awards ==
FES was a recipient of the Skoll Award for Social Entrepreneurship in 2015, and Jagdeesh Rao was honored during the awards ceremony as part of the Skoll World Forum in Oxford, England on 16 April 2015.

In 2013, FES was awarded the Times of India Social Impact Award 2012 in the Environment category. It was jointly shared with Dhan Foundation.

On the World Day to Combat Desertification (17 June) the Foundation for Ecological Security was awarded the United Nations Convention to Combat Desertification (UNCCD) instituted Land for Life Award 2013 for its work on assisting village communities in the sustainable management of common lands in India.

The Foundation for Ecological Security (FES) is also the recipient of the prestigious Elinor Ostrom International Award on Collective Governance of the Commons for the year 2013, for outstanding contribution to the practice of Commons governance.
