= Rohini Nilekani =

Indian writer, philanthropist, and wife of Nandan Nilekani

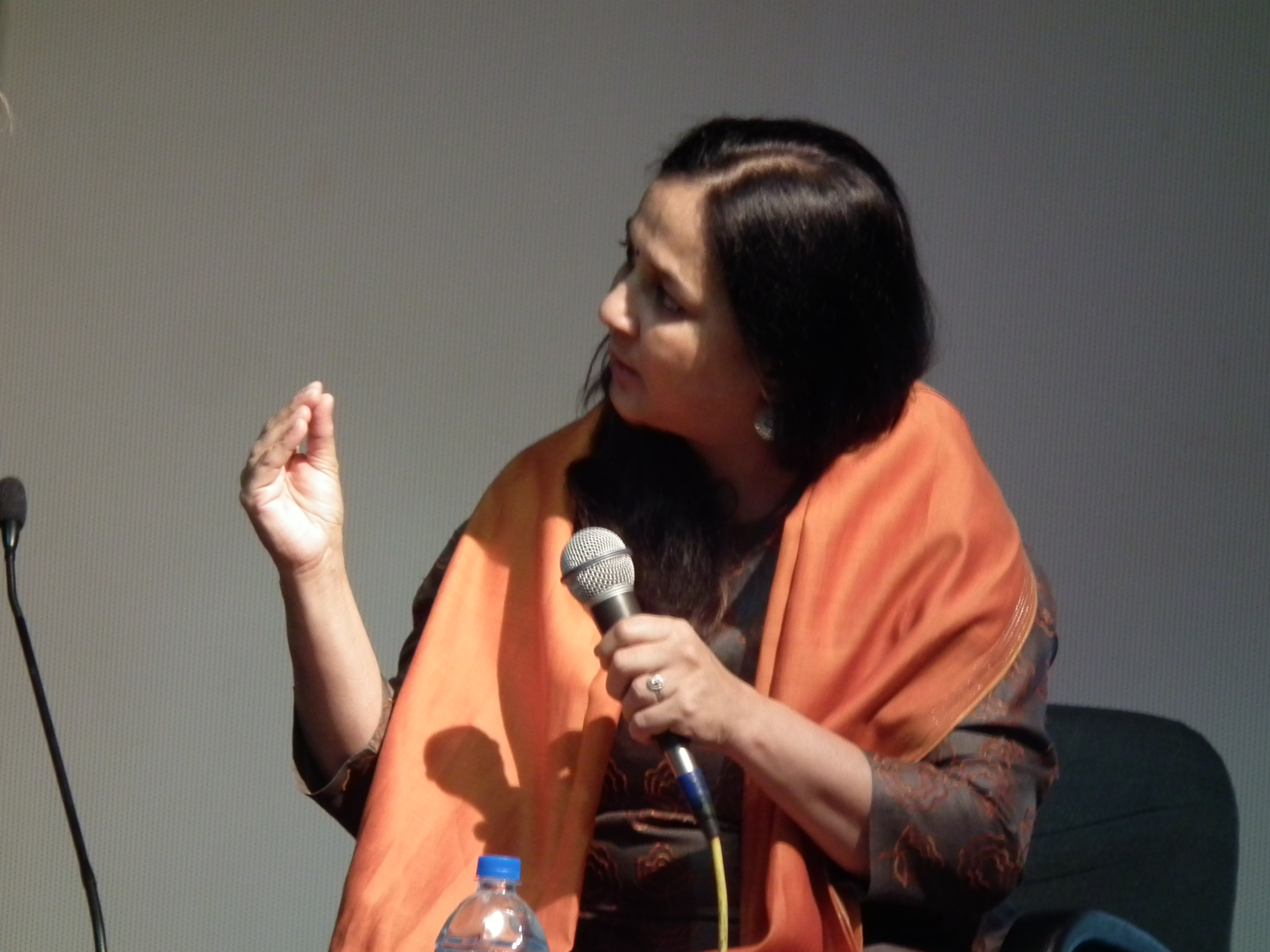
- Rohini Nilekani in January 2013
- Born: 1960 (age 65–66)
- Other name: Noni
- Education: Elphinstone College; St. Xavier's College, Mumbai
- Occupations: Writer, Philanthropist, and former Chairperson of Arghyam Foundation
- Organization(s): Infosys, Arghyam Foundation, Akshara Foundation, Pratham Books, EkStep, Rohini Nilekani Philanthropies
- Notable work: Stillborn (1998)
- Television: Uncommon Ground (NDTV)
- Spouse: Nandan Nilekani
- Children: 2

Rohini Nilekani (born 1960) is an Indian writer, author and philanthropist. She is the founder of Arghyam Foundation, a non-profit that focuses on water and sanitation issues, founded in 2001. She also chairs the Akshara Foundation, which focuses on elementary education. Nilekani serves as the co-founder and director of non-profit education platform, EkStep. She is chairperson of Rohini Nilekani Philanthropies.

== Early life ==
Rohini grew up in a middle-class family in Mumbai, India. Her father was an engineer and her mother a homemaker. She holds a degree in French literature from Elphinstone College.

== Career and work ==
After completing her studies, Rohini started working as a reporter at the now-defunct Bombay Magazine in 1980 and later worked in Bangalore for Sunday magazine.

In 1998, she released her first novel, Stillborn, which was published by Penguin Books. Stillborn was a medical thriller novel and was well received by the readers. She has written and published her own children's stories, Sringeri Series, published by Pratham Books, a non-profit publisher of children's books, which she co-founded in 2004.

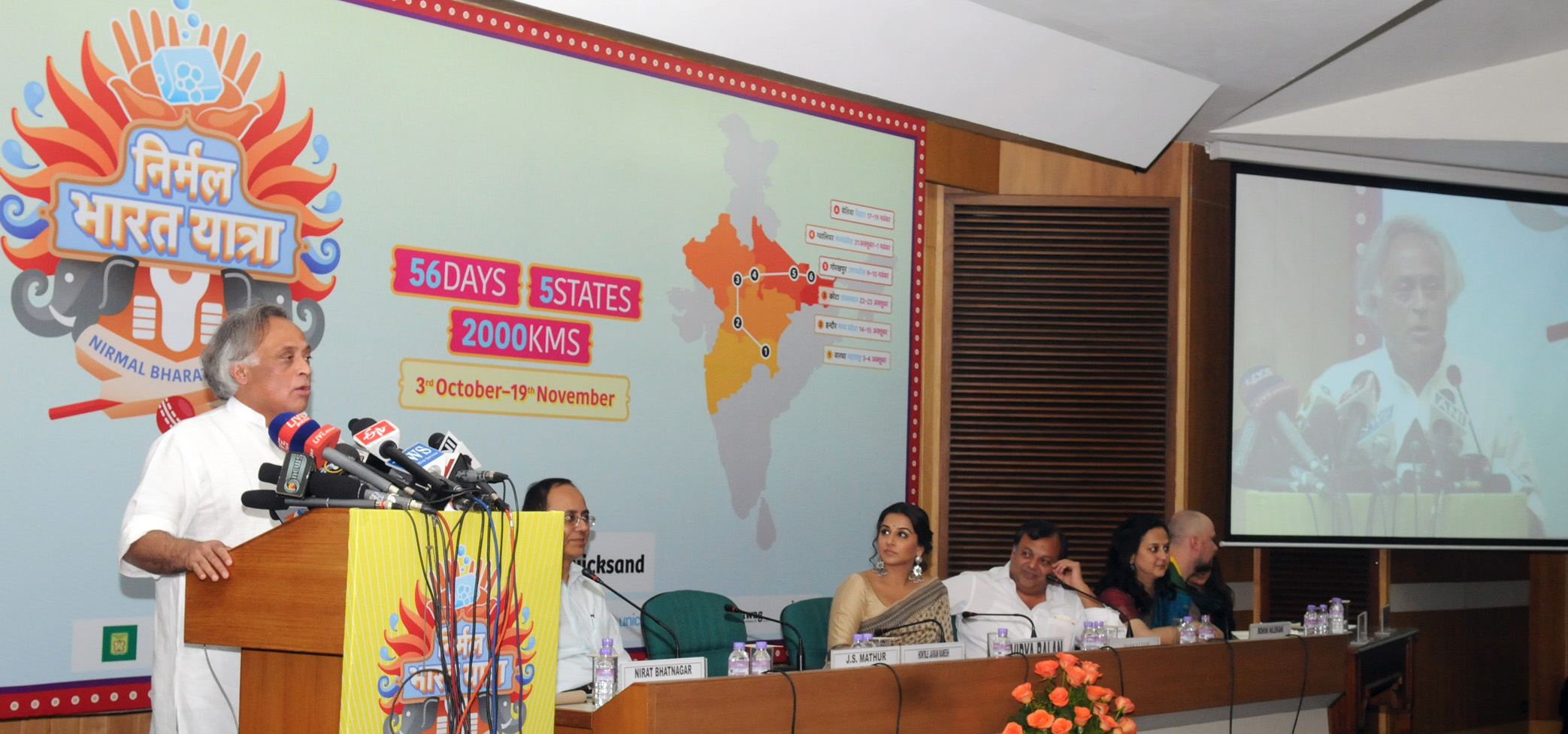
The Union Minister for Rural Development, Jairam Ramesh briefing on 'Nirmal Bharat Yatra' to create awareness about sanitation, in New Delhi on September 28, 2012. The actress Vidya Balan and Rohini Nilekani are also seen.

Her second book, Uncommon Ground, a nonfiction work based on her reporting as an anchor of the 2008 Indian TV program of the same name. Uncommon Ground was also published by Penguin Books in 2011. In 2001, Rohini Nilekani founded Arghyam Foundation, a non-profit that works on water and sanitation issues and is funded by her personal endowment.

Nilekani is on the board of trustees of Ashoka Trust for Research in Ecology and the Environment (ATREE). She serves on the Eminent Persons Advisory Group of the Competition Commission of India since May 2012. In July 2011, she was appointed as a member of the Audit Advisory Board of the Comptroller and Auditor General of India. She was inducted as a Foreign Honorary Member of the American Academy of Arts and Sciences in 2017.

She took retirement as the chairperson of the Arghyam Foundation in September 2021. Nilekani currently supports 80 civil society organizations working on climate change, gender equity, justice, governance and animal welfare.

Nilekani is listed in Hurun India 2025 Women Leaders.

== Published books ==
Year	Title	Publishing house	International Standard Book Number
1998	Stillborn	Penguin India	ISBN 9780670085620
2011	Uncommon Ground	Penguin India	ISBN 9788182638945
2020	The Hungry Little Sky Monster	Juggernaut Books	ISBN 9789353451349
2022	Samaaj, Sarkaar, Bazaar: a citizen-first approach	Notion Press	ISBN 9798887336947

== Philanthropy ==
In April 2001, Nilekani founded Arghyam with a personal endowment of ₹150 crores. Nilekani is also a philanthropist and pledged ₹50 crores to Ashoka Trust for Research in Ecology and the Environment (ATREE). In December 2013, Rohini and her husband, Nandan Nilekani donated ₹50 crores to the National Council of Applied Economic Research to build a new India center at its New Delhi campus. In August 2013, she sold 5.77 lakh shares in Infosys to raise about ₹164 crores for philanthropic work. She was named as one of Asia's Heroes Of Philanthropy by Forbes Magazine in 2010 and 2014. She supports around 80 civil society organizations, working in climate change, gender equity, independent media, governance and the animal welfare sector. She won the Best Grassroots Philanthropist at Forbes India Leadership Awards in March 2022. She received the Philanthropist of the Year 2020-21 Award from the Associated Chambers of Commerce and Industry of India (ASSOCHAM).

In October 2022, the EdelGive Hurun India Philanthropy List 2022 was released, featuring rankings for both male and female philanthropists, with Rohini Nilekani topping the list of women philanthropists by donating ₹120 crore in the financial year 2022. Her donations were primarily focused on the areas of education and environmental sustainability. In November 2022, Rohini Nilekani along with Kiran Mazumdar-Shaw and Kris Gopalakrishnan collectively donated ₹51 crore to Science Gallery Bengaluru (SGB), a not-for-profit public institution for research-based engagement.

In April 2023, Rohini Nilekani, through the Rohini Nilekani Philanthropies Foundation, made a donation of ₹100 crore to the National Institute of Mental Health and Neurosciences (NIMHANS) in Bengaluru to support and accelerate research and treatment in five major areas of mental health.

== Personal life ==
Rohini is married to Nandan Nilekani. She met him at a quiz competition at her college in 1977. The couple has two children, Janhavi and Nihar. Her daughter Janhavi Nilekani is the founder of Aastrika Foundation which works in the field of maternal health.
