= N. S. Raghavan =

Indian businessman

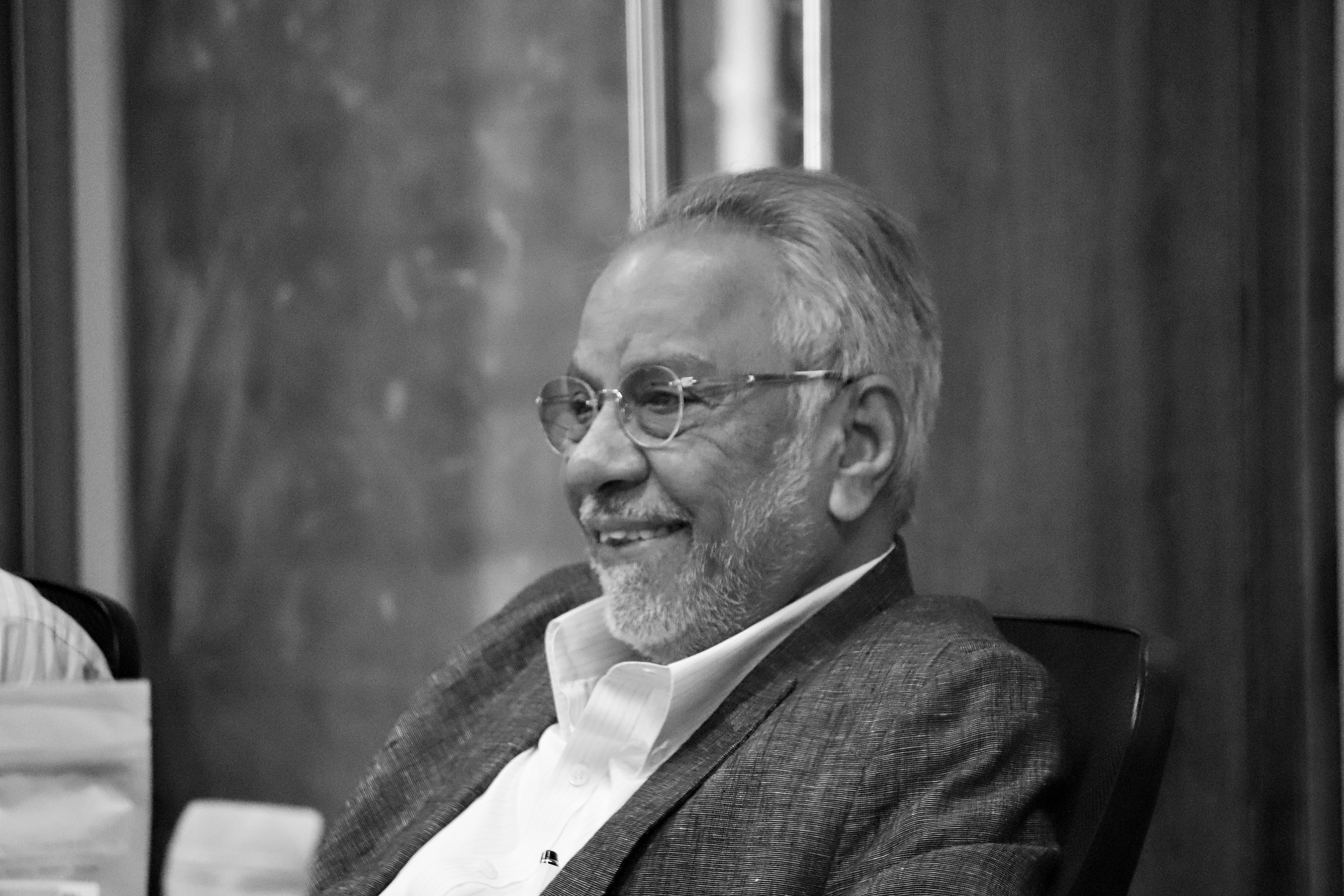

Nadathur Sarangapani Raghavan is an Indian industrialist, and one of the seven founders of Infosys Technologies, a global consulting and IT services company based in India. The company was incorporated as "Infosys Consultants Pvt Ltd.", with Raghavan's house in Model Colony, north-central Pune as the registered office. Raghavan is the first official employee of the Infosys company and he retired as joint managing director in 2000. After retiring from Infosys, he worked as a chairman at Murugappa Group for one year. Along with a few associates, he started Nadathur Holdings & Investments in 2000. He is currently the chairman of the advisory council of the N. S. Raghavan Centre for Entrepreneurial Learning (NSRCEL) at IIM Bangalore.

== Personal life ==
N. S. Raghavan is the son of Sarangapani of the Nadathur family. He has two sons who are both businessmen & Entrepreneurs, Sriram Nadathur and Anand Nadathur.

== See also ==
- N. R. Narayana Murthy
- Nandan Nilekani
