= U. B. Pravin Rao =

Former COO of Infosys

Pravin Rao
- Education: Bangalore University (BTech)
- Occupation: Chief Operating Officer from 2014 to 2021
- Employer: Infosys

U. B. Pravin Rao is a retired corporate executive from Infosys. Rao joined Infosys in 1985 and rose through the ranks under N. R. Narayana Murthy. He was handpicked by Murthy to be member of Infosys board as well as become chief operating officer by Murthy in June 2014, when Vishal Sikka was appointed as CEO. Rao served as interim CEO and MD after Vishal Sikka stepped down till appointment of Salil Parekh as CEO and MD on 2 December 2017. He retired from Infosys as chief operating officer in December 2021.

He is a member of the National Council of Confederation of Indian Industry (CII) and the Executive Council of Nasscom. He served as chairman of NASSCOM in the financial year 2020-2021.

N. R. Narayana Murthy slams the salary hike to Pravin Rao when he was the COO of Infosys.
