= Coghead =

American web application company

- Type: Privately held company
- Industry: web development
- Founded: 2003
- Headquarters: Redwood City, California, United States
- Products: web applications
- Number of employees: 23 (2007)
- Website: www.coghead.com

Coghead was a web application company based out of Redwood City, California. The company offered a web-based service for building and hosting custom online database applications. Applications were built around custom data collections and were typically designed to facilitate management of, and collaboration on, business data. Examples of Coghead's "gallery" applications include project management, simple Customer relationship management, bug tracking and extreme programming.

Coghead's service was available through a limited-access beta program before "going live" for free trial accounts in April, 2007. Coghead launched a paid subscription plans in June, 2007.

On February 19, 2009, Coghead announced that its intellectual property assets (its 'service') had been acquired by SAP AG (NYSE:SAP).

== Product ==
Coghead's product was a fully hosted environment for building, accessing, and maintaining applications and the associated business data. Like other so-called "Web 2.0" companies, Coghead built its product around the idea of "software as a service".

The product was intended to allow users to design a range of applications from scratch using only a drag and drop, WYSIWYG user interface, with very limited scripting or coding (if any) required.

Coghead also offered its paid subscribers the ability to develop and publish "Coglets," web forms that allowed site visitors to view data in, or submit data into, the host's Coghead database.

On February 19, 2009, Coghead announced that SAP AG had acquired the Coghead service through an asset purchase.

The SAP asset purchase closed in the 1st Quarter 2009. Immediately upon closing the asset purchase, the public-facing service was taken off-line by SAP as they prepared to integrate the Coghead code with other SAP assets. This forced many of Coghead's customers to find alternative solutions.
