= Salil Parekh =

Indian businessman, current chief executive officer and managing director of Infosys

- Born: 5 June 1964 (age 62)
- Education: IIT Bombay (BTech); Cornell University (MS)
- Occupations: CEO & MD of Infosys
- Spouse: Shaleen S. Parekh
- Mother: Kokila S. Parekh

Salil Parekh (born 5 June 1964) is the current chief executive officer and managing director of Infosys. Parekh took over from interim CEO U. B. Pravin Rao on 2 January 2018 for a five year term. The Infosys board has announced that Ashiss Kumar Dash will succeed him as CEO in April 2027.

Parekh is a member of The Business Council.

== Early life and education ==
Salil Parekh is born into a Gujarati family. He is a graduate from the Indian Institute of Technology, Bombay (IIT Bombay) in Aeronautical Engineering. Master of Engineering degree in Computer Science and Mechanical Engineering from Cornell University.

Parekh was member of the group management board at Capgemini, where he had worked since 2000, after Ernst & Young's consultancy division, where he had been working before, was merged into the company.

Parekh was member of the group executive board, and was appointed deputy CEO in March 2015. He was responsible for overseeing a business cluster comprising Application Services and Cloud Infrastructure Services among others. He then ascended as CEO of MD of Infosys in 2018. Under his leadership Infosys underwent a major digital transformation that increased their company's revenue by 35%.

== Whistleblower allegations ==
In 2019, a board member of Infosys received two anonymous whistleblower complaints of unethical practices at Infosys that also accused Salil Parekh. Audit Committee of the Board of Directors conducted independent investigation into the allegations contained in the anonymous whistleblower complaints and determined that the allegations are substantially without merit. The Audit Committee conducted a thorough investigation with the assistance of independent legal counsel Shardul Amarchand Mangaldas & Co. and PricewaterhouseCoopers Private Ltd.
