= Finacle =

Banking software

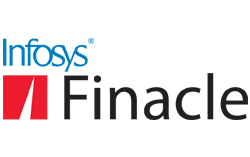
- Original author(s): Infosys
- Developer(s): Infosys
- Initial release: 1999
- Operating system: Cross-platform
- Service name: Infosys Finacle Banking
- Type: Banking software
- License: Commercial
- Website: www.finacle.com

Finacle is a banking software developed by Infosys. Finacle was created in 1999 as a core banking software suite and has been a part of Infosys' subsidiary EdgeVerve Systems since 2015.

== History ==
Infosys launched Finacle in 1999 as a software package providing banking process automation and digital banking services. In 2002, Infosys consolidated its other banking software products, including BankAway and PayAway, under Finacle.

In 2006, Finacle reported that it generated about 69% of its total revenue from overseas locations, largely from banks and financial institutions in the EMEA region. In 2007, Finacle released its Bank-in-a-Box (BIAB) software framework. In 2008, Finacle added Islamic banking, wealth management, mobile banking, and rural banking capabilities.

In 2010, Finacle reported around $300 million in annual revenue. In 2013, American Banker noted that the new version of Finacle allowed the purchase of individual modules. In 2014, Finacle global head Mangipudi Haragopal resigned and was replaced by Michael Reh.

In 2015, Infosys merged Finacle with its software products subsidiary EdgeVerve Systems. Under EdgeVerve Systems, Finacle became a cloud-based platform, and included customer relationship management and payments offerings. In 2017, Finacle released Trade Connect, a blockchain-based trade finance application for banks.

== Operations ==
Finacle had 6,000 employees in 2015. As of 2020, Finacle claimed that it was being used by banks in over 100 countries.

== See also ==
- TCS BaNCS
- Temenos AG
