= Infosys BPM =

Company subsidiary

Infosys BPM Limited
- Formerly: Progeon Limited (2002–2006); Infosys BPO Limited (2006–2017)
- Type: Subsidiary
- Industry: Business Process Management
- Predecessor: Progeon Ltd.
- Founded: April 2002; 24 years ago as Progeon Limited
- Headquarters: Electronic City, Bengaluru, India
- Area served: Worldwide
- Key people: Anantha Radhakrishnan (CEO & MD); Vasudeva Maipady K. (CFO)
- Services: Outsourcing, Business Transformation
- Revenue: USD 1.5 Billion (FY 2023)
- Number of employees: 60,229 (as of September, 2026)
- Parent: Infosys
- Website: www.infosysbpm.com

Infosys BPM Limited, formerly Progeon Limited, is the business process management subsidiary of Infosys. It was founded in April 2002, and is headquartered in Bengaluru, India. Infosys BPM provides integrated outsourcing and transformation services.

== History ==
The company was started as Progeon Limited in April 2002 and is among the leading outsourcing companies in India according to NASSCOM. It was started as a 74-26 joint venture between Infosys and Citibank Investments. In 2006, Infosys bought out Citibank's share at a price of ₹592 per share, Citibank having invested at ₹0.20 per share.

It opened its first international office in Brno, Czech Republic in 2004 to support its European clients. In 2006, its employee strength reached 10,000 and its name was changed from Progeon Limited to Infosys BPO Limited. It was renamed to Infosys BPM Limited in 2018. In 2019, Infosys BPM formed a joint venture with Hitachi, Panasonic and Pasona. Infosys took an 81% stake in the new company, HIPUS Co. Ltd, which was aimed at providing digital procurement platforms for the Japanese market.

As of March 2025, Infosys BPM had 59,443 employees, most of which were based in India.

== Corporate affairs ==
=== Organizational structure ===
Infosys BPM operates through 44 delivery locations across 16 countries in Asia, Americas, Europe and rest of the world, with majority of its employee strength based in India. The company currently employs more than 50,200 people (31 Dec. 2021).

About 60% business of Infosys BPM comes from overlapping clients with the parent Infosys Ltd. During the FY 2013-14, it earned 48% of its revenue from North America, 34% from Europe, 4% from India and remaining 14% from other parts of the world. The proportion of voice and non-voice related revenue was 11:89 in the same financial year.

It has a total of six subsidiaries. The three major subsidiaries are Infosys Portland, Infosys McCamish Systems, both of which are acquisitions, and Infosys BPO Americas, LLC.

=== Acquisitions ===
- In October 2019, Infosys BPM acquired Ireland-based Eishtec for an undisclosed sum. Eishtec, which was established in 2011, specialises in providing services to the telecoms, social media, healthcare, edtech and fintech sectors. It has offices in Waterford, Wexford, Clonmel, and Craigavon in Northern Ireland. It is expected that all 1,400 employees will transfer with the business.
- In September 2012, Infosys BPM acquired US-based Marsh BPO for an undisclosed amount to expand its group life insurance activities. Marsh BPO, based in Des Moines, Iowa, has 87 employees and serves seven insurers and covers more than 600,000 insured lives. Marsh BPO will be absorbed in McCamish Systems.
- In January 2012, Infosys BPM acquired Australia-based Portland Group for about AUD 37 million. Portland Group provides strategic sourcing and category management services.
- In December 2009, Infosys BPM acquired Atlanta-based McCamish Systems for about $38 million.
- In July 2007, Infosys BPM signed a $28 million deal to acquire finance back-offices of Royal Philips spread in India, Poland and Thailand.
