= Omnichannel order fulfillment =

Omnichannel order fulfillment is a material handling fulfillment strategy and process that treats inventory as fully available to all channels (e-commerce, store replenishment and wholesale) from one location. While the internal fulfillment process may diverge to optimize the operations, the outbound process only diverges at the point of pack out and shipping.

It allows companies to deliver goods to multiple channels using a single facility with a single workforce, delivering from a single inventory. The channel dictates the order size, delivery requirements, packaging, shipment method and rules for handling shortages. Single-channel facilities can have a fixed set of criteria.

Some embodiments of omnichannel order fulfillment eliminate the need for bulk storage, pallets and lift trucks. Instead, products are sent directly to universal storage and pick modules. The process is designed so that items can be selected simultaneously for any channel requirements. Omnichannel solutions may operate where orders are not grouped into waves, as is common in pick operations. Instead, customer orders or product demand is entered into worker pick lists as soon as they are initiated for processing at the distribution center, which promotes both fulfillment flexibility and processing speed. In such operations associates doing the picking don't know whether they are picking an online order or a store order. They pick and replenish simultaneously, work with dynamic stock keeping unit (SKU) locations, and generally touch and move items with minimal fear of introducing errors.

The omnichannel fulfillment method disables repetitive activities for different distribution channels and makes sure products are available for all the channels equally. Furthermore, it improves the ability to respond to the customer in a timely manner, providing them a consistent shopping experience.

== Warehouse management ==
Software is what makes warehouse management possible throughout the omnichannel order fulfillment process. In the era of online shopping, fulfillment centers need versatility, flexibility and visibility. Therefore, using the correct software is critical. The software needs to be able to handle a variety of orders and find the most cost-efficient way to sort SKUs based on physical characteristics, SKU velocity and order profiles. Systems that give fulfillment centers access to real-time information about what’s going on in their facilities at all times provide the flexibility needed to respond quickly as events are occurring rather than after the fact.

Retailers are increasingly using warehouse management systems (WMS) and warehouse execution systems (WES) to improve store-level inventory accuracy and expand support for new omnichannel flow paths. The WMS/WES supports processes such as pick-to-cart, return fulfillment and the ability to see a picture of the item to be picked.

== Omnichannel flow paths ==
- Order online/deliver to customer
- Order online/pick up at store
- Order online/deliver from store
- Order online/return to store
- Select and pickup at store
