= Nandan Nilekani =

Indian businessman

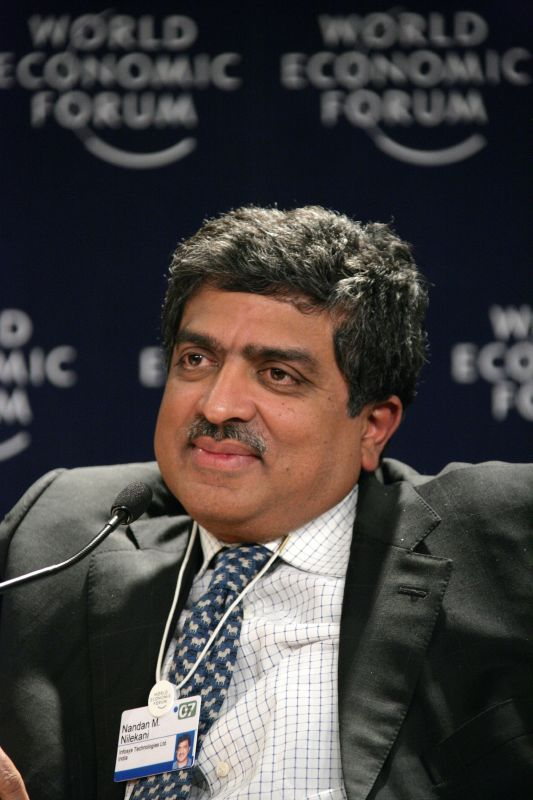
- Nilekani in 2007 in World Economic Forum, Cologny, Switzerland

Personal details
- Born: June 2, 1955 (age 71) Bangalore, Mysore State (present-day Karnataka), India
- Party: Indian National Congress
- Spouse: Rohini Nilekani (m. 1981)
- Children: 2
- Education: Bachelor of Technology
- Alma mater: Indian Institute of Technology, Bombay
- Occupation: Non-executive chairman of Infosys, and former chairman of UIDAI
- Awards: Padma Bhushan (2006)

Nandan Mohanrao Nilekani is an Indian entrepreneur. He co-founded Infosys and is the non-executive chairman of Infosys replacing R Seshasayee and Ravi Venkatesan, who were the co-chairs of the board, on 24 August 2017. After the exit of Vishal Sikka, Nilekani was appointed non-executive chairman of the board effective 24 August 2017. He was the chairman of the Unique Identification Authority of India (UIDAI). After a successful career at Infosys, he headed the Government of India's technology committee, TAGUP. He is a member of Indian National Congress but not active in politics as of 2019. As of October 2025, he is the 100th richest person in India with a net worth of US$3.2 billion.

In July 2026, Government of India announced the constitution of a high-powered task force, to be headed by Nilekani, to recommend steps to make the country’s examination system leak-proof and technology-driven.

== Early life and education ==
Nilekani was born in Bangalore, Karnataka. His parents, Durga and Mohan Rao Nilekani, were Konkani-speaking people originally from Sirsi. His father worked as the GM of the Mysore and Minerva Mills and subscribed to Fabian Socialist ideals, which influenced Nilekani during his early years. His elder brother, Vijay, works at the Nuclear Energy Institute in the U.S.

Nilekani studied at the Bishop Cotton Boys' School, Bangalore, and then at St. Joseph's High School in Dharwad before completing his Pre-university from Karnatak College, Dharwad. He then completed his bachelor's degree in Electrical engineering from the Indian Institute of Technology, Bombay.

== Career ==
=== Information technology ===
In 1978 he started his career at the Mumbai-based Patni Computer Systems, where he met and was interviewed by N.R. Narayana Murthy. In 1981, Nilekani, Murthy, and five others left Patni to start their own company, Infosys. Nilekani became the chief executive officer of Infosys in March 2002 and was CEO of the company through April 2007, when he relinquished his position to his colleague Kris Gopalakrishnan and became co-chairman of the board of directors. Before assuming leadership as CEO in 2002, Nilekani held various posts, including managing director, president, and chief operating officer. He was its CEO from March 2002 to April 2007. During his five-year tenure as CEO, Infosys' topline grew sixfold to $3 billion.

In 2017 he returned to Infosys after the exit of CEO Vishal Sikka to become a chairman. Upon his return he changed power centre from California back to its Bengaluru headquarters. Also, such people as R. Seshasayee (a chairman and board director), Ravi Venkatesan (a co-chairman), Sikka (executive vice chairman and director), and Jeffrey Lehman and John Etchemendy (directors) resigned from their posts.

=== Bureaucracy ===
Nilekani left Infosys in July 2009 to become the chairman of the Unique Identification Authority of India, a cabinet-ranking position that he entered under the invitation of Prime Minister Dr. Manmohan Singh. As chair of the UIDAI he was responsible for implementing the envisioned Multipurpose National Identity Card, or Unique Identity card (UID Card) project in India. This initiative aims to provide a unique identification number for all residents of India and will be used primarily as the basis for the efficient delivery of welfare services. The identification method will be biometric, and the drive to create this government database of the entire population of India has been called "the biggest social project on the planet."

They developed Aadhaar, which is an Indian biometric ID system, a database, which contains demographic information, home addresses of Indians. In April 2017 1.14 billion Indian people got their ID number. In 2016, World Bank Chief Economist Paul Romer called Aadhaar “the most sophisticated ID programme in the world.” This program is criticized for violating people's privacy and exposing personal information.

He is a member of the board of governors of the Indian Council for Research on International Economic Relations (ICRIER) and the president of NCAER. He also sits on several advisory boards, including those of the World Economic Forum Foundation and the Bombay Heritage Fund.

Nilekani has appeared on The Daily Show with Jon Stewart to promote his book Imagining India: The Idea of a Renewed Nation and spoke at a TED conference in 2009 on his ideas for India's future.

Nandan Nilekani played a key role in the development of the Unified Payments Interface (UPI), a system that revolutionized digital payments in India. He was instrumental in its creation while serving as the chairman of the Unique Identification Authority of India (UIDAI) and also led a committee that developed a framework for digital payments. Nilekani envisions a future where the energy sector experiences a similar transformation, drawing parallels to UPI and calling it "the next UPI".

=== Politics ===
Nilekani joined Indian National Congress in March 2014 and contested from the Bangalore South constituency where he lost by 228,575 votes to BJP candidate Ananth Kumar in the 2014 Lok Sabha election.

In December 2016, he joined a committee to investigate how people in India could use digital payments to a greater extent.

==== General election 2014 ====
According to news reports, he was the richest candidate for the 2014 Lok Sabha elections with declared assets worth Rs 7,710 crore in his affidavit filed before the Election Commission.

2014 Indian general election: Bangalore South
Party	Candidate	Votes	%
BJP	Ananth Kumar	633,816	56.9%
INC	Nandan Nilekani	405,241	36.4%
JD(S)	Ruth Manorama	25,677	2.3%
AAP	Nina P. Nayak	21,403	1.9%
Turnout		1,113,726	55.7%
BJP hold			

=== EkStep ===
Nilekani is chairman of EkStep, a non-profit literacy and numeracy platform. Set up by the Nilekanis with an initial commitment of $10 million (about Rs 82 crore), EkStep looks at solving the 'learning problem' by creating a technology-led platform to help children in improving their 'learning outcomes' quite early in their life. EkStep intends to do it using gamified apps, hosted in the Google Play Store.

=== NCAER ===
Nilekani is president of the governing body of the New Delhi-based National Council of Applied Economic Research (NCAER), India’s largest and oldest non-profit economic research think tank. NCAER, established in 1956, does grant-funded independent economic policy research and sponsored research studies for governments and industry. Its work covers almost all branches of economics, from economic forecasting to poverty analysis. NCAER is among a handful of think tanks globally that collect primary survey data on a scientific, national basis covering households, enterprises, consumers, and individuals. NCAER’s economic and social data sets are used widely for research and analysis on India.

=== Investments ===
Nilekani is also a serial investor and he has invested in technologoy startups including 10i Commerce, Juggernaut, Mubble Networks, Fortigo, P2SME, Railyatri, Axiom Consulting, Systemantics India, Sedemac Mechatronics, Disha Medical Services, Tracxn Technologies, and LetsVenture.

=== Charity ===
In 2017 Nandan and wife Rohini decided to donate 50 percent of their wealth to Giving Pledge, which is a movement organized by Bill Gates. The reason why they joined this movement was as following: "We see inequality is increasing sharply in most countries. We see the young and the restless in this interconnected globe, unsure of their future, wanting more but anticipating less."

He also donated money to rebuild the hostel campus of IIT Bombay.

In 2008 he also set up the Indian Institute for Human Settlements to help to solve urban challenges for India.

== Personal life ==
Nilekani is married to Rohini Nilekani (née Soman), whom he met at a quizzing event at IIT. They have two children, Nihar and Janhavi, each of whom has received an undergraduate degree from Yale University. His first language is Konkani. In addition to Konkani, he speaks Kannada fluently along with English, Marathi, and Hindi. The Nilekani family has a 2.31 percent stake in Infosys as per the quarter ended March 2018.

== Honours and awards ==
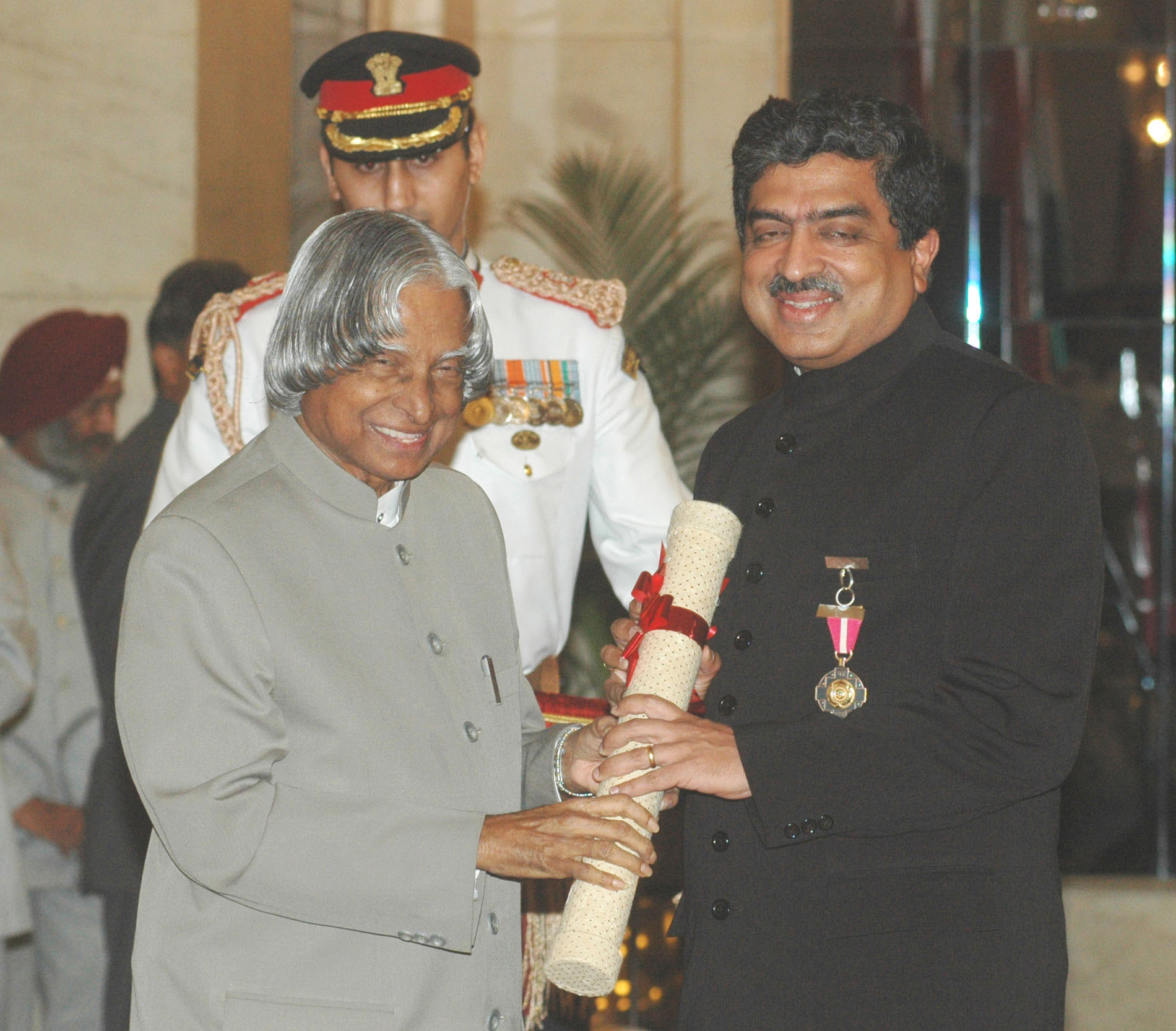
The President, Dr. A.P.J. Abdul Kalam presenting the Padma Bhushan Award – 2006 to Shri Nandan Mohan Nilekani, one of the founders of Infosys, in New Delhi on 20 March 2006

== National honors ==
India

  - Padma Bhushan (2006)

== Other Recognitions ==
- He was awarded an honorary Doctor of Law degree by the Rotman School of Management at the University of Toronto on 31 May 2011.
- He received NDTV Indian of the Year's Transformational Idea of the Year Award in 2011
- He was named Corporate Citizen of the Year at the Asia Business Leaders Award (2004) organised by CNBC.
- Joseph Schumpeter Prize for innovative services in economy, economic sciences and politics – 2005.
- In 2009, Time magazine placed Nilekani in the Time 100 list of 'World's Most Influential People'
- Was presented the 'Legend in Leadership Award' by the Yale University in November 2009. He is the first Indian to receive the top honour.
- In January 2006, Nilekani became one of the youngest entrepreneurs to join 20 global leaders on the World Economic Forum (WEF) Foundation Board.
- Also in 2006, he was named Businessman of the Year by Forbes Asia.
- India Today magazine ranked him 12th in India's 50 most powerful people of 2017 list.
- In 2017 he received the Lifetime Achievement Award from E & Y. CNBC- TV 18 conferred India Business leader award for outstanding contributor to the Indian Economy-2017.
- He received the 22nd Nikkei Asia Prize for Economic & Business Innovation 2017.
- Awarded Doctor of Science (Honoris Causa) by IIT Bombay during the Institute's 57th Convocation, in 2019.

== Bibliography ==
- Nandan Mohan Nilekani (2009). Imagining India: The Idea of a Renewed Nation (19 March 2009 ed.). Penguin Press HC. p. 528. ISBN 978-1-59420-204-9.
- Nandan Nilekani; Viral Shah (3 November 2015). Rebooting India: Realizing a Billion Aspirations (3 November 2015 ed.). Penguin Books Limited. p. 340. ISBN 978-81-8475-084-3.
