= Global delivery model =

The term global delivery model is typically associated with companies engaged in IT consulting and services delivery business and using a model of executing a technology project using a team that is distributed globally. While the commonly understood meaning of the term implies globally distributed resources, the term itself has acquired a broader definition. Gartner, for example, defines global delivery model to encompass a "focus on the technical skills, process rigor, tools, methodologies, overall structure and strategies for seamlessly delivering IT-enabled services from global locations".

Most IT services and consulting firms worldwide make a reference to this model of delivery to signify one or more of the following value propositions they bring to their customers:

- A global presence would enable companies to respond fast for changing customer requirements.
- A global presence implies that the organization has access to resources of varying costs that allows it to deliver services to its customers at an optimal cost, typically a mix of costlier 'on-site' resources combined with cheaper 'offshore' resources.
- A global delivery model implies that potentially, a firm can work round the clock for its customer, handing off work from one location to another at the end of the 'day shift' ('follow-the-sun' model) - thus providing twice or even three times the capacity they would have if they worked in a single location/ time-zone only.
- Global delivery model would bring down cultural differences.

Although global delivery models are quite often associated to IT services and consulting it has actually seen its application in several other areas. A few examples where global delivery model exists are illustrated below.

- There are several organizations who have discovered there is value in performing tasks at geographic locations that provide most cost efficiencies. As a result, processing employee claims, accounting receivables/payables, etc. follow a global delivery model.
- Customer services have also seen extensive use of global delivery model whereby call center associates are spread globally offering 24/7 service to clients who are in another time zone.
- Areas related to processing of forms, verification, legal processing and documentation and such are increasingly finding application of global delivery. Needless to say, manufacturing has seen the greatest applicability whereby the entire product manufacturing life-cycle has been outsourced to countries like China. Manufacturing has seen such broader outsourcing that things like aircraft wings which is considered to be the core differentiator for any airline manufacturer is also outsourced.

== See also ==
- Offshore outsourcing
