= Infosys =

Indian multinational technology company founded in 1981

Infosys Limited

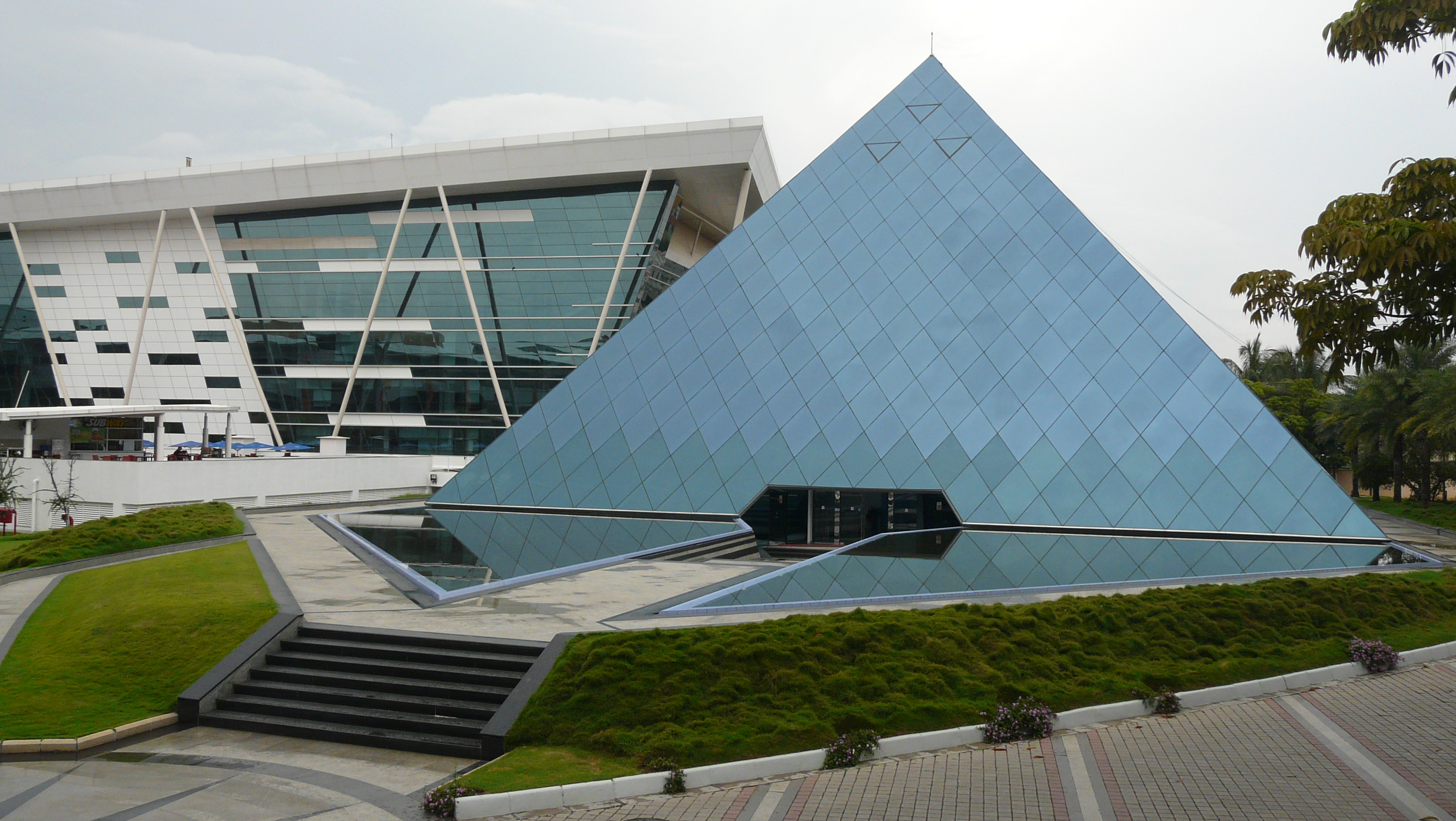
- Headquarters in Bengaluru
- Formerly: Infosys Consultants (1981–1992); Infosys Technologies (1992–2011)
- Type: Public
- Traded as: BSE: 500209; NSE: INFY; NYSE: INFY; BSE SENSEX constituent; NSE NIFTY 50 constituent
- ISIN: INE009A010321
- Industry: Information technology Consulting; Outsourcing
- Founded: 2 July 1981; 45 years ago in Pune, India
- Founders: N. R. Narayana Murthy; Nandan Nilekani; Kris Gopalakrishnan; S. D. Shibulal; K. Dinesh; N. S. Raghavan; Ashok Arora
- Headquarters: Bengaluru, Karnataka, India
- Area served: Worldwide
- Key people: Nandan Nilekani (Chairman); Salil Parekh (MD & CEO)
- Products: Finacle; Panaya
- Revenue: ▲₹178,803 crore (US$19 billion) (2026)
- Operating income: ▲₹36,254 crore (US$3.9 billion) (2026)
- Net income: ▲₹29,474 crore (US$3.1 billion) (2026)
- Total assets: ▲₹155,967 crore (US$17 billion) (2026)
- Total equity: ▼₹93,297 crore (US$10 billion) (2026)
- Number of employees: ▲328,594 (March 2026)
- Divisions: Infosys Consulting; Infosys BPM; EdgeVerve Systems
- Website: infosys.com
- Footnotes; Financials as of 31 March 2026

Infosys Limited is an Indian multinational technology company that offers information technology, business consulting, and outsourcing services. Founded in 1981 by seven engineers, the company is headquartered in Bengaluru and considered one of the Big Six Indian IT companies.

Infosys has also attracted controversies due to allegations of visa and tax fraud in the United States and for creating malfunctioning government websites.

== History ==
Infosys was founded by N. R. Narayana Murthy, Nandan Nilekani, Kris Gopalakrishnan, S. D. Shibulal, K. Dinesh, N. S. Raghavan, and Ashok Arora, with an initial capital of $250. It was incorporated as Infosys Consultants Private Limited in Pune on 2 July 1981, before relocating to Bangalore in 1983. Arora left the company in 1989 and sold his shares to the other co-founders.

In the 1980s, Infosys briefly made hardware products like electronic telex machines and keyboard concentrators. Its core business of offshore custom software development witnessed growth after the 1991 economic liberalisation of India.

In February 1993, Infosys launched its initial public offering (IPO) with an offer price of ₹95 per share. The IPO was initially undersubscribed which led American investment bank Morgan Stanley to price stabilize the IPO by acquiring a 13% equity stake in INFY. The share price eventually opened at ₹145 per share in June 1993.

Infosys released its banking automation software package Bancs2000 in 1995, middleware architecture product Entark in 1995, and Y2K problem toolset "In2000" a year later. In the mid to late 1990s, Infosys also incubated software product subsidiaries like e-fulfillment and WMS software provider Yantra, and mobile VAS developer OnMobile, which were subsequently spun off and divested.

Infosys listed its American depositary receipts (ADRs) on Nasdaq in March 1999, making it the first Indian company to be listed on Nasdaq. Infosys was then among the top 20 companies by market capitalization on the Nasdaq. The ADR listing was later transferred to NYSE Euronext to provide European investors with better access to the company's shares.

In 1999, Infosys rolled out Finacle, a core banking software suite developed as the successor to Bancs2000. The same year, Infosys started its research and innovation arm called SETLabs (later renamed Infosys Labs). In 2004, SETLabs formed an intellectual property (IP) cell; Infosys was reported to be earning about 10% of its total revenue from patent pending IP assets in 2006.

In 2002, Infosys created a business process management division called Progeon (now Infosys BPM), with Citigroup taking a minority stake in the venture for $20 million. In 2004, Infosys established a wholly owned consulting subsidiary called Infosys Consulting, based in Fremont, California. In 2006, Infosys bought out Citigroup's entire 23% stake in Progeon for $115 million.

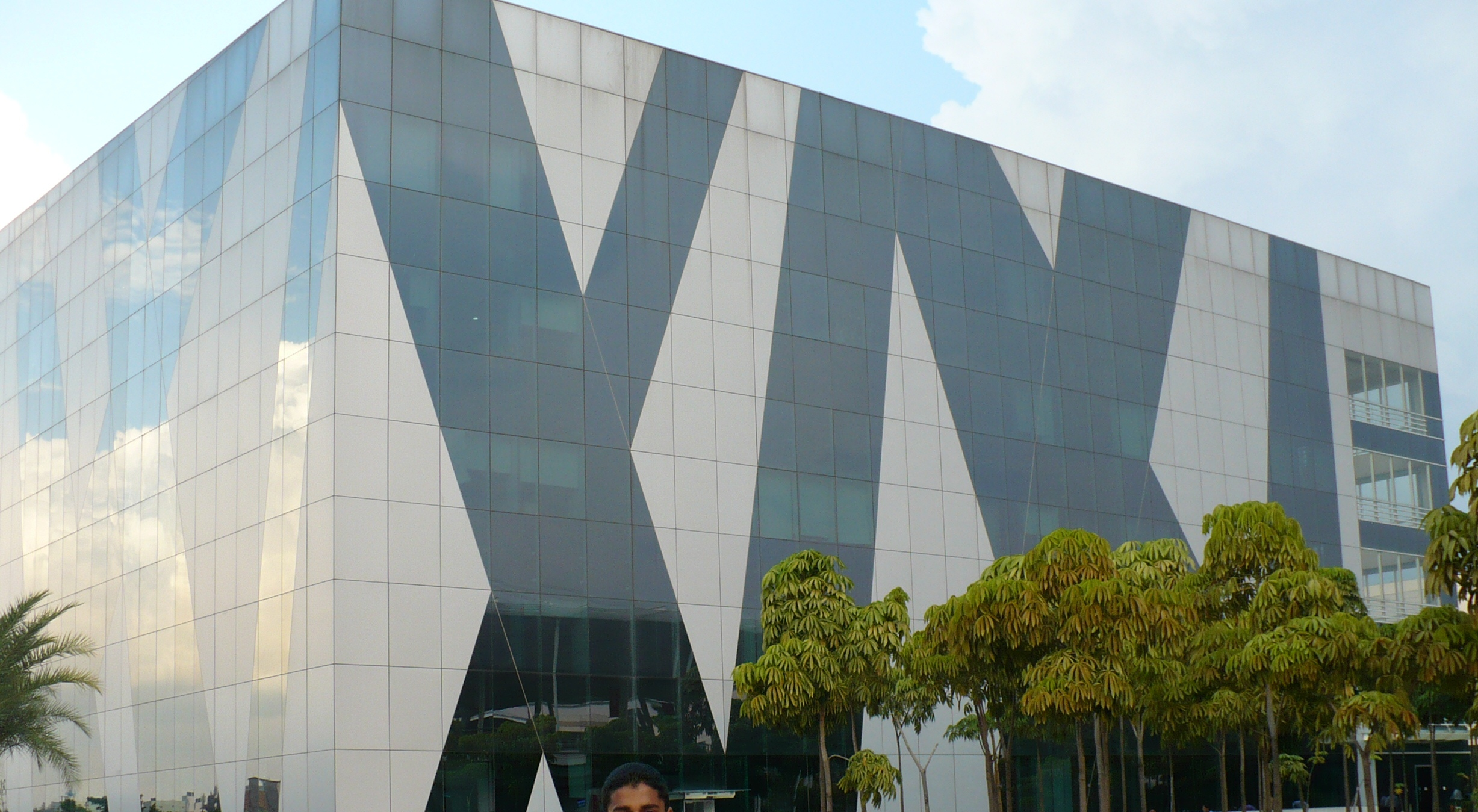
Infosys, Bengaluru in 2008

In 2009, Infosys set up a subsidiary, Infosys Public Services, based in Rockville, Maryland, with a focus on federal and state government projects in the US, Canada, and the UK. In 2012, Infosys opened its 18th US office, in Milwaukee, primarily to serve Harley-Davidson; the company also announced having hired over 1,200 employees in the US in 2011 and an additional 2,000 employees in 2012.

In July 2014, Infosys established an enterprise software subsidiary named EdgeVerve Systems, with products in business operations, customer service, procurement, and commerce network domains. In August 2015, Infosys transferred assets of Finacle to EdgeVerve Systems.

In 2015, Infosys launched the $500 million Infosys Innovation Fund to invest in early-stage startups focused on emerging technologies and deep tech, including a $250 million allocation for Indian startups.

In 2018, Infosys formed a Singapore-based 60:40 joint venture with Temasek Holdings known as Infosys Compaz (iCompaz), serving clients in the Southeast Asian markets.

On 24 August 2021, Infosys became the fourth Indian company to achieve a market capitalization of US$100 billion.

In October 2025, Infosys secured a 15-year contract worth £1.2 billion ($1.59 billion) from the NHS Business Services Authority to replace the National Health Service's existing payroll platform. Under the agreement, Infosys will build a new data-driven workforce management platform to replace the NHS Electronic Staff Record system, managing payroll for 1.9 million employees across England and Wales and processing more than £55 billion annually.

== Services and products ==
Infosys offers software development, maintenance, and independent validation services across industries such as finance, insurance, manufacturing, among others. Through its subsidiary Infosys Consulting, it provides consulting services in digital experience, cloud, data analytics, artificial intelligence, engineering, and sustainability. Its subsidiary Infosys BPM provides outsourcing services for business processes such as finance, procurement, customer service, and HR.

Infosys offers digital products and platforms for digital transformation, including digital banking software Finacle, application delivery platform Panaya, digital commerce platform Infosys Equinox, workplace platform Infosys Meridian, and customer engagement platform Infosys Cortex. It also provides sets of services and platforms in domains such as cloud with Cobalt, generative AI with Topaz, and AI marketing with Aster.

== Acquisitions ==
Name	Based in	Acquisition cost	Acquisition date	Business
Expert Information Services	Australia	$23 million	Dec 2003	IT services
Gen-i Software	New Zealand	Undisclosed	Jun 2011	Software consulting
Lodestone Holding	Switzerland	$345 million	Sep 2012	Management consultancy
Panaya	Israel	$200 million	Mar 2015	Automation technology
Skava (Kallidus)	United States	$120 million	Apr 2015	Digital experience solutions
Noah Consulting	United States	$70 million	Nov 2015	Information management consulting services
Skytree	United States	Undisclosed	Apr 2017	Machine learning
Brilliant Basics	United Kingdom	£7.5 million	Aug 2017	Product design and customer experience
Fluido Oy	Finland	€65 million	Oct 2018	Salesforce advisor and consulting partner
WongDoody	United States	$75 million	Jan 2019	Advertising and creative strategy services
Stater N.V.	Netherlands	€127.5 million	Apr 2019	Mortgage services
Simplus	United States	$250 million	Feb 2020	Salesforce consulting
Kaleidoscope	United States	$42 million	Sep 2020	Product design and development
GuideVision	Czech Republic	€30 million	Sep 2020	ServiceNow partner
Blue Acorn iCi	United States	$125 million	Oct 2020	Digital transformation
Carter Digital	Australia	Undisclosed	Jan 2021	Design agency
Oddity	Germany	€50 million	Mar 2022	Digital marketing
BASE life science	Denmark	€110 million	Jul 2022	Life science consulting and technology
InSemi	India	₹280 crore	Jan 2024	Semiconductor design services
in-tech	Germany	€450 million	Apr 2024	Engineering R&D services
MRE Consulting	United States	$36 million	Apr 2025	Consulting
The Missing Link	Australia	A$98 million	Apr 2025	Cybersecurity and cloud services

== Listing and shareholding pattern ==
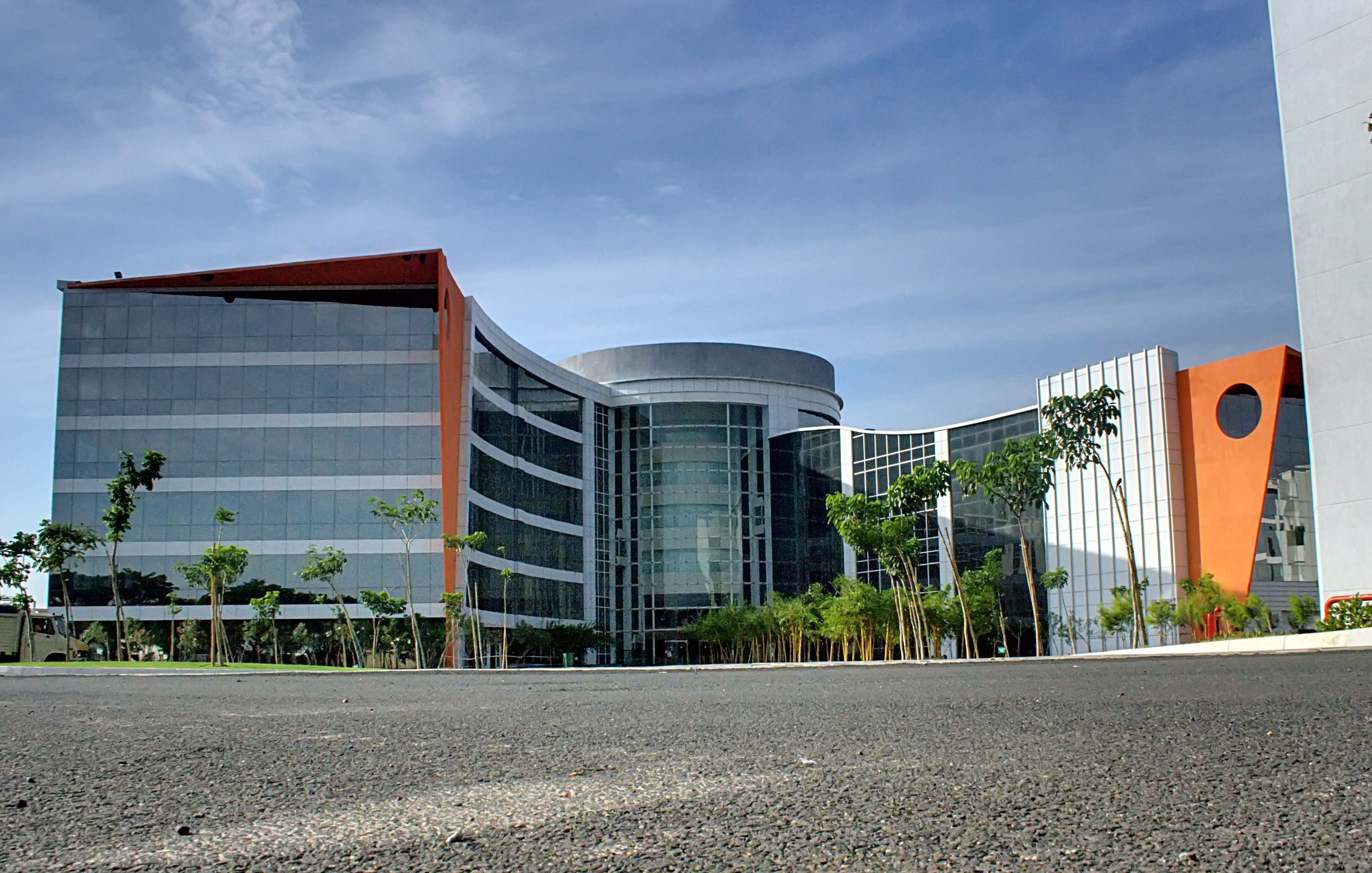
Main block in the Chennai campus in June 2009

In India, Infosys shares are listed on the BSE, where it is a part of the BSE SENSEX, and on the NSE, where it is included in the NIFTY 50 index. Infosys also trades its shares through American depositary receipts (ADRs) on the New York Stock Exchange.

Over the years, the shareholding of Infosys's promoters has steadily decreased. This trend began in June 1993, when Infosys first listed its shares on the BSE. The promoter shareholding further declined when Infosys instated employee stock option scheme in 1993 and listed ADRs on Nasdaq on 11 March 1999.

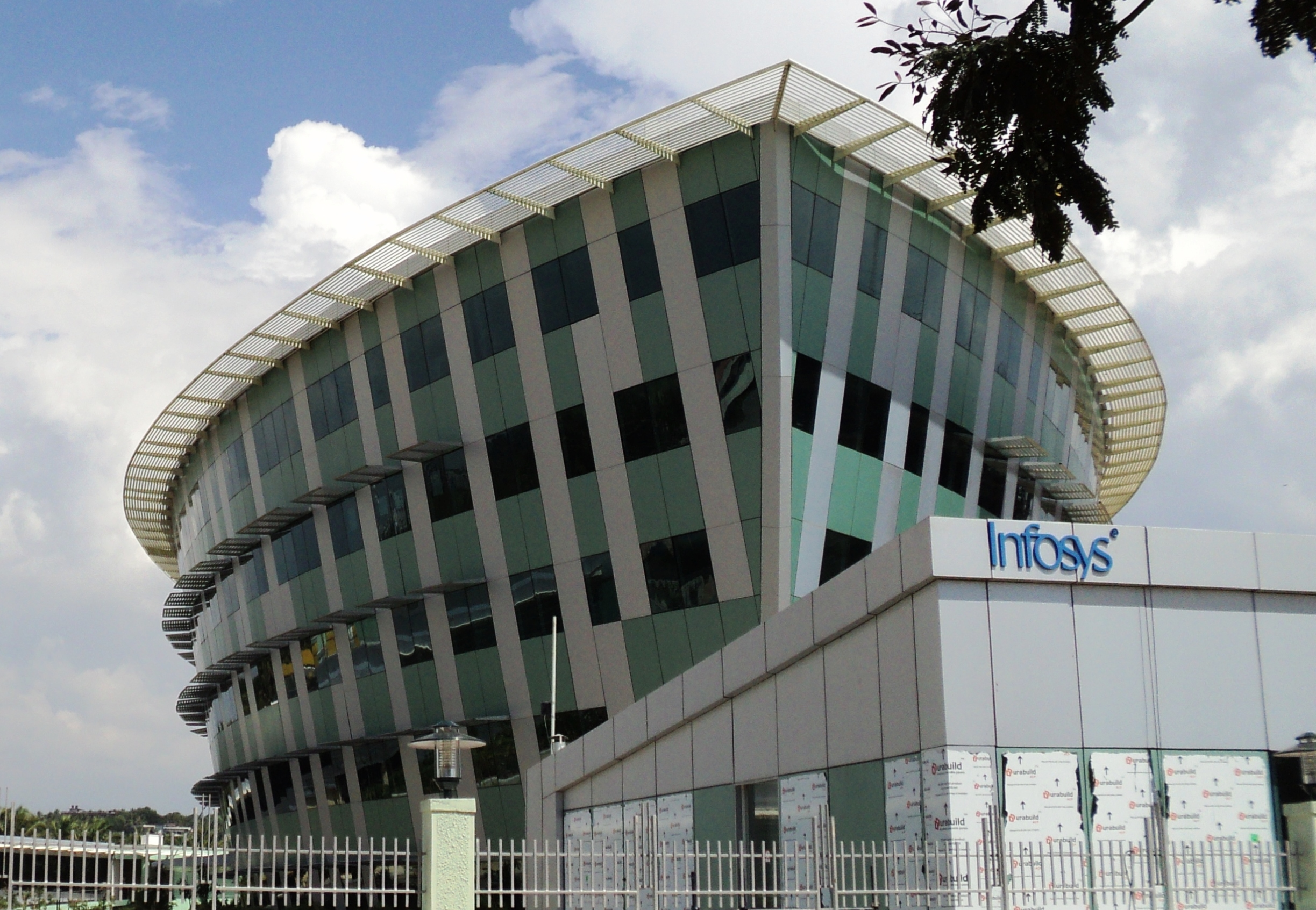
A building in Thiruvananthapuram campus in 2010

Infosys shareholding and stakeholders pattern (as of 31 March 2024)
Shareholders	Shareholding
Promoters group	14.61%
Foreign institutional investors (FII)	32.74%
Domestic institutional investors (DII)	37.59%
Public	14.81%
Others	0.25%
Total	100.00%

== Operations ==
=== Geographical presence ===
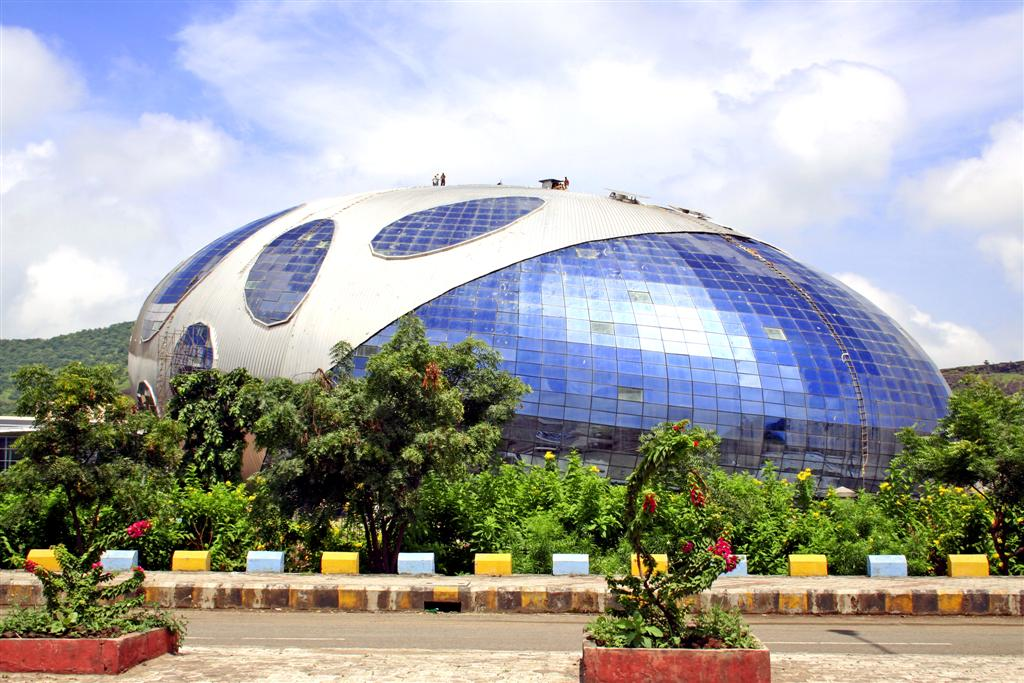
Glass building in Pune campus in 2008

As of 31 March 2024, Infosys operates 94 sales and marketing offices and 139 development centres globally. The company's operations are spread across key regions, including India, the United States, Canada, China, Australia, Japan, the Middle East, and Europe.

In the fiscal year 2023-24, Infosys generated approximately 61% of its revenue from North America, 25% from Europe, 3% from India, and 11% from other regions, including the Middle East, Australia, and Japan.

Infosys faced scrutiny over its continued operations in Moscow following Russia's invasion of Ukraine in February 2022. The company clarified that it had no active business with Russian firms. By November 2022, only administrative staff remained, handling the transfer of contracts to other contractors.

=== Training centre in Mysore ===
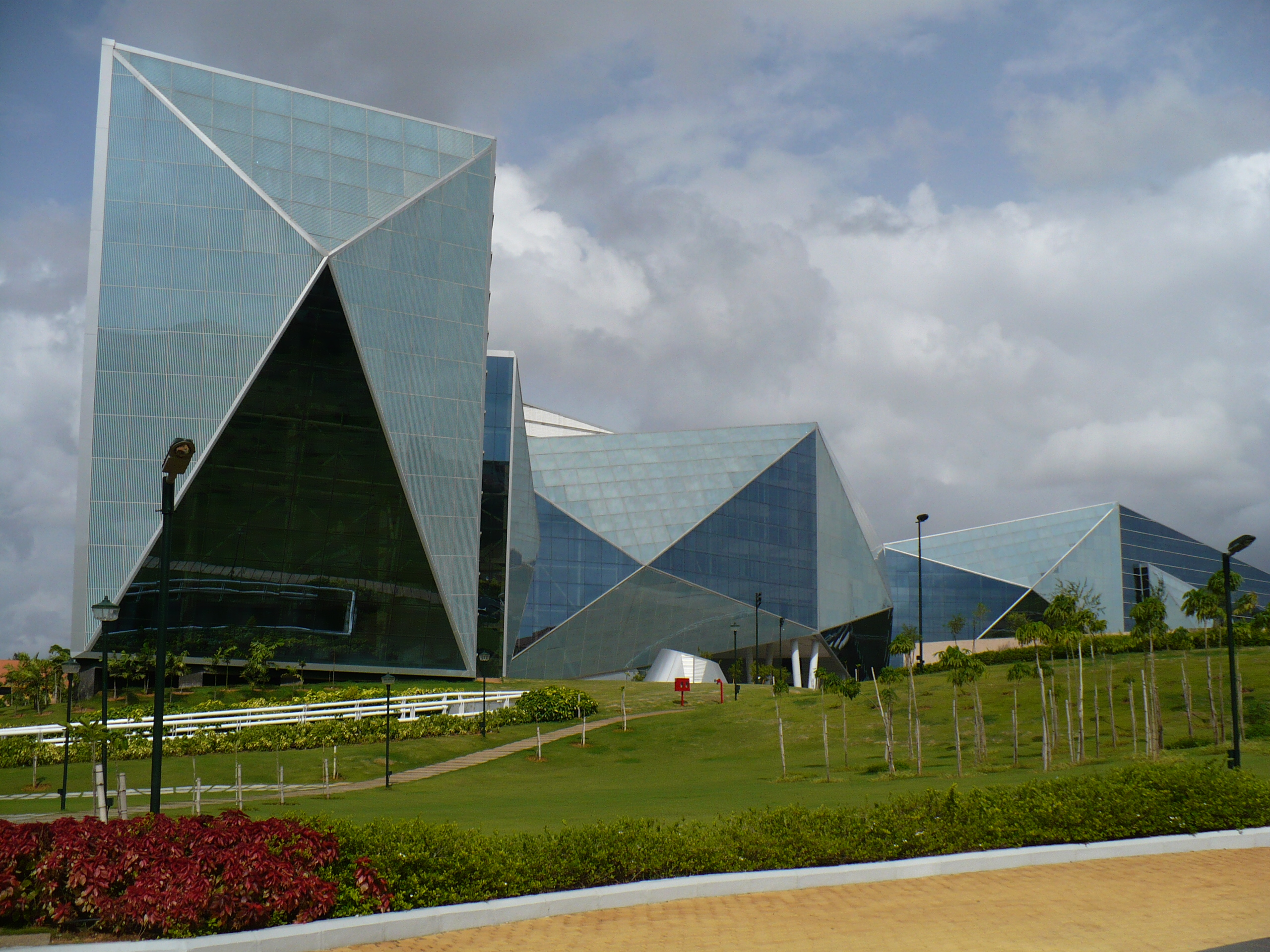
The Development Centre on the Mysore campus in July 2008

As the world's largest corporate university, the Infosys Global Education Centre, located on a 136-hectare (337-acre) campus in Mysore, features 400 instructors and over 200 classrooms. Established in 2002, it had trained approximately 125,000 engineering graduates by June 2015. The centre can accommodate and train up to 14,000 employees at any given time across various technologies.

The Infosys Leadership Institute (ILI), located in Mysore, trains approximately 4,000 trainees annually. Its primary objective is to cultivate and develop senior leaders within Infosys, preparing them for both current and future executive roles.

=== Employees ===
As of 31 March 2024, Infosys employed a total of 317,240 people, commonly referred to as "Infoscions," or "InfoSysers" with 39.3% of them being women. In 2023, 85% of Infosys' employees were located in India.

Starting mid-2015, Infosys did away with its dress code, allowing jeans and casual clothes every day. This change is noticeable because, since 2008, a formal dress code—including a tie for males twice a week—had been mandatory at the company.

=== CEOs ===
From its establishment in 1981 until 2014, Infosys' CEOs were its founders, with N. R. Narayana Murthy leading the company for the initial 21 years. Vishal Sikka was the first external CEO, serving for approximately three years. Sikka resigned in August 2017. Following his departure, UB Pravin Rao was appointed as Interim CEO and Managing Director of the company. Infosys appointed Salil Parekh as Chief Executive Officer (CEO) and Managing Director (MD), effective from 2 January 2018.

List of CEOs

Name	Period
N. R. Narayana Murthy	1981 to March 2002
Nandan Nilekani	March 2002 to April 2007
Kris Gopalakrishnan	April 2007 to August 2011
S. D. Shibulal	August 2011 to July 2014
Vishal Sikka	August 2014 to August 2017
U. B. Pravin Rao (interim)	August 2017 to December 2017
Salil Parekh	January 2018 onwards

== Controversies ==
=== Settlement of visa and tax fraud cases in the US ===
In 2011, Infosys was accused of visa fraud for using B-1 (visitor) visas for work that required H-1B (work) visas. The allegations originated from an internal complaint by an American employee of Infosys, who subsequently filed a lawsuit against the company, claiming harassment and marginalization after raising the issue. Although the lawsuit was dismissed, along with another similar case, these allegations were brought to the attention of US authorities, leading to investigations by the US Department of Homeland Security and a federal grand jury.

In October 2013, Infosys agreed to settle the civil suit with US authorities by paying $34 million. While the company did not admit guilt, it stated that it settled to avoid the complications of "prolonged litigation". Infosys asserted that, "As reflected in the settlement, Infosys denies and disputes any claims of systemic visa fraud, misuse of visas for competitive advantage, or immigration abuse. Those claims are untrue and are assertions that remain unproven."

In December 2019, Infosys reached an $800,000 settlement with the State of California in a visa and tax fraud case. Between 2006 and 2017, nearly 500 Infosys employees were found to be working in the state on Infosys-sponsored B-1 visas instead of the required H-1B visas, enabling the company to avoid paying California payroll taxes, including unemployment insurance, disability insurance, and employment training taxes.

In June 2026, Infosys temporarily suspended recruitment assessments for more than 20,000 candidates applying for Specialist Programmer and Digital Specialist Engineer trainee roles after detecting multiple instances of impersonation and assessment malpractice during its hiring process. The company, which recruits from 300–400 colleges across India each year, introduced additional verification and security measures and informed affected candidates that revised assessment dates would be communicated once new protocols were in place.

=== Malfunctioning government portals ===
In 2013, technical issues emerged after Infosys took over the MCA21 portal from Tata Consultancy Services. Similar problems arose in 2016 after a system migration and version update.

In 2020, the finance ministry identified glitches in the GSTN portal, leading to a summons for Infosys executives. In 2022, chartered accountants and tax professionals raised concerns over technical issues with the GSTN portal.

In 2021, the newly launched Income Tax portal, developed by Infosys, encountered multiple glitches. Despite a summons for Infosys CEO Salil Parekh, the issues remained unresolved for months, forcing an extension of the tax filing deadline. In 2022, users continued to report malfunctions and issues on the first anniversary of the portal's launch.

=== Tracking software ===
It was reported in late 2013 that Infosys’ plan to install software to track the actual time staff spent on their computers caused resentment among employees.

=== Labour violation in France ===
In July 2026, Infosys was fined €175,000 by DRIEETS Île-de-France, the country's regional labour authority after its working-time recording system was found to be violating French labour regulations.

== See also ==
- List of IT consulting firms
- List of Indian IT companies
