= Kris Gopalakrishnan =

Indian billionaire

Senapathy "Kris" Gopalakrishnan
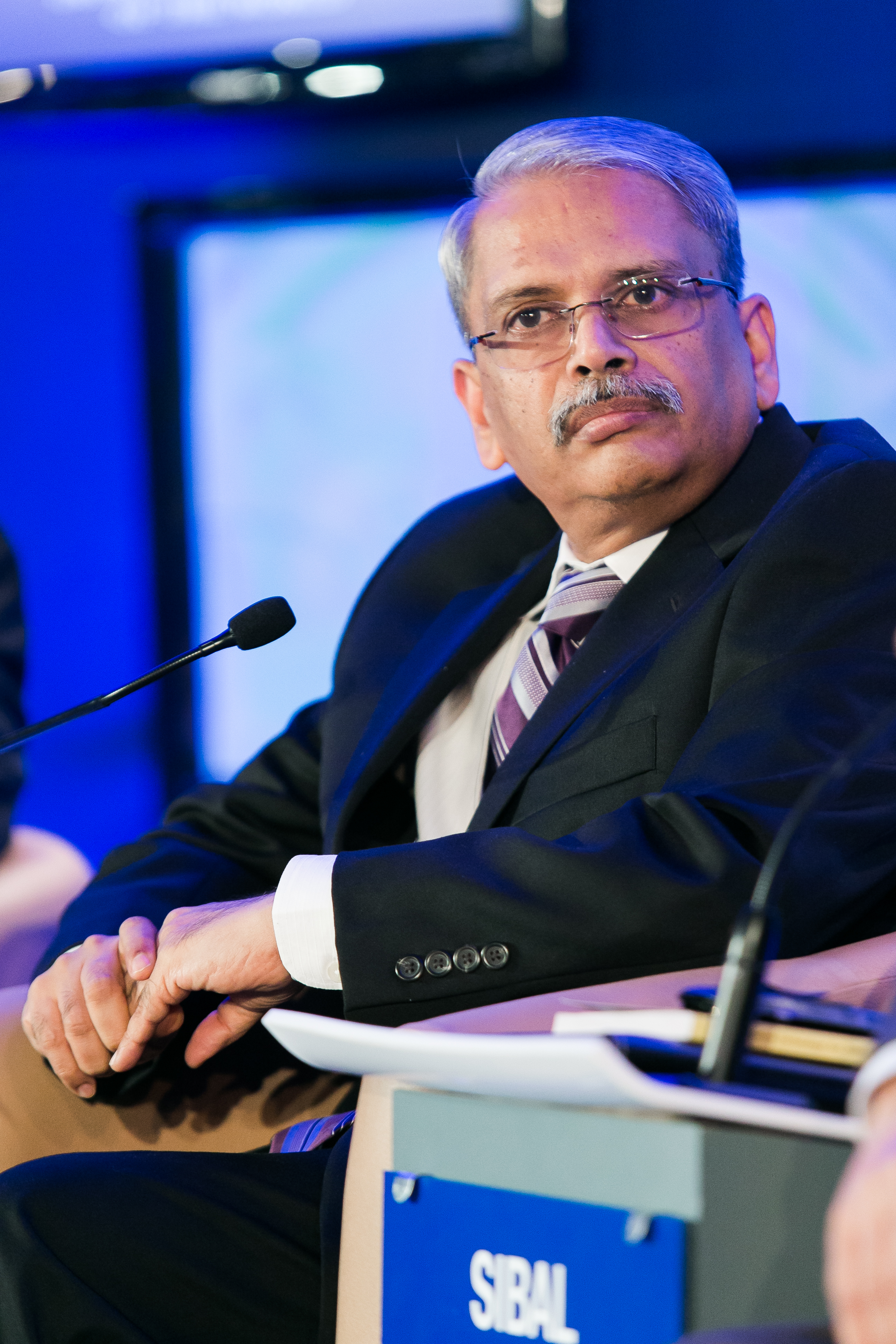
- Gopalakrishnan at the World Economic Forum on India in 2012
- Born: Senapathy Gopalakrishnan; 5 April 1955 (age 71); Thiruvananthapuram, Kerala, India
- Education: Government Arts College, Thiruvananthapuram; University College Thiruvananthapuram; Indian Institute of Technology Madras
- Occupations: Executive vice chairman, Infosys
- Years active: 1981–2014
- Spouse: Sudha Gopalakrishnan
- Children: 1

Senapathy “Kris” Gopalakrishnan is an Indian businessman and the chairman of Axilor Ventures, a startup accelerator. He is one of the co-founders of Infosys, having served as its CEO and managing director from 2007 to 2011 and vice chairman from 2011 to 2014.

Recognised as a global business and technology thought leader, he was voted the top CEO (IT Services category) in Institutional Investor's inaugural ranking of Asia's Top Executives and selected as one of the winners of the second Asian Corporate Director Recognition Awards by Corporate Governance Asia in 2011. He was elected president of India's apex industry chamber Confederation of Indian Industry (CII) for 2013–14 and served as one of the co-chairs of the World Economic Forum in Davos in January 2014.

In January 2011, the Government of India awarded Gopalakrishnan the Padma Bhushan, the country's third-highest civilian honour.

Gopalakrishnan serves on the board of governors of Okinawa Institute of Science and Technology, is the chairman of the Council of Indian Institute of Science, and is the chairman of the board of governors of International Institute of Information Technology, Bangalore. He is the chairman of the Vision Group on Information Technology of Karnataka Government, the chairman of RBIH (Reserve Bank of India Innovation Hub), and the chairman of CII Centre of Excellence in Innovation, Entrepreneurship and Startups (CIES). He is also President of Sree Chitra Tirunal Institute for Medical Sciences and Technology, Trivandrum.

Gopalakrishnan is the chairman of Itihaasa Research and Digital which publishes the history of the Indian IT industry as microsite as well as reports on industrial and academic research in India. He is the Co-author of Against All Odds – The IT Story of India.

Gopalakrishnan invests in promoting research on brain sciences, ageing, ageing-related disorders, as well as investing in start-ups and start-up ecosystems. His family philanthropy is Pratiksha Trust and his investment arm is Pratithi.

Gopalakrishnan holds master's degrees in physics and computer science from the Indian Institute of Technology, Madras. Kris is a Fellow of Indian National Academy of Engineers (INAE) and an Honorary Fellow of Institution of Electronics and Telecommunication Engineers (IETE) of India.

As per Forbes' list of India's 100 richest tycoons in 2024, Senapathy Gopalakrishnan is ranked 73rd with a net worth of $4.35 billion.

== Early life ==
Gopalakrishnan was born in Thiruvananthapuram, Kerala on 5 April 1955. He studied at the Government Model Boys Higher Secondary School.

He obtained an M.Sc. in Physics in 1977 and M.Tech. in Computer Science in 1979, both from IIT Madras. He started his career as a software engineer with Patni Computer Systems, Mumbai, in 1979.

== Positions held ==
Gopalakrishnan has served in leadership roles in several research/educational and industry/startup institutions and forums.

=== Positions in research / educational institutions and bodies ===
- Chairing the governing board of India's ₹36.6 billion (US$495.14 million) National Mission on Cyber-Physical System Technologies
- Board of Governors of Okinawa Institute of Science and Technology
- Chairman, The Council, IISc Bangalore
- Chairman, Board of Governors of IIIT, Bangalore
- Member of DBT/Wellcome Trust India Alliance's Strategic Advisory Council
- Nanyang Professor of the Practice at Nanyang Technological University, Singapore from 1 June 2018
- Trustee of the Infosys Science Foundation

=== Positions in industry / government institutions and bodies ===
- Chairman of Vision Group on IT for Government of Karnataka
- President of the Confederation of Indian Industries (2013–14)
- Co-chair of the World Economic Forum in Davos (2014)
- Member of the United Nations Global Compact Board (2012–15)
- Chairperson of India's committee on Non-Personal Data Governance
- First Chairperson of the Reserve Bank Innovation Hub
- Chairman of CII Centre of Excellence for Innovation, Entrepreneurship and Start-ups and former chairman of CII Start-up Council

== Awards and honours ==
- In 2011, Government of India awarded him with Padma Bhushan which is India's third highest civilian honour
- Conferred with an honorary doctorate by the University of Kerala in 2019
- Thinkers 50 (2009)

== Philanthropy ==
=== Support for research and entrepreneurship in India ===
Through Axilor Ventures, Gopalakrishnan has invested in many startups and venture funds. He has put his wealth towards causes such as health research, specifically brain science, and other technological innovations.

Gopalakrishnan is supporting and guiding several India-focused initiatives, through his leadership roles in various Government committees/bodies and philanthropic initiatives, in the following areas:

=== Brain science and computer science ===
Gopalakrishnan has contributed ₹2.25 billion (equivalent to ₹3.9 billion or US$41 million in 2026) to develop a Centre for Brain Research at the Indian Institute of Science in Bangalore. He is the donor of the largest philanthropic gift ever received by the 105-year-old institute from an individual. He has contributed an additional ₹600 million (equivalent to ₹990 million or US$10 million in 2026) to set up distinguished visiting chairs in Neurocomputing and Data Science at the IISc Bengaluru and Indian Institute of Technology Madras of Chennai.

Another project Gopalakrishnan has funded at IIT Madras is the "Sudha Gopalakrishnan Brain Centre", which he says is the first of its kind in the world. The centre is undertaking the cellular-level image mapping of the brain.

Gopalakrishnan is chairing the governing board of India's ₹36.6 billion (US$380 million) National Mission on Cyber-Physical System Technologies which is overseeing the establishment of 25 hubs related to CPS and allied technologies.

=== Healthcare ===
Gopalakrishnan has furthered ageing research in India through the Srinivasapura Aging Neuro Senescence and Cognition Study, and GenomeIndia, a pan-India initiative focused on Whole Genome Sequencing of 10,000 individuals from representative populations across India. He is also supporting the Accelerator Program for Discovery in Brain Disorders using Stem Cells at the National Centre for Biological Sciences in Bangalore, Karnataka.

He is on the Board of Swasth Digital Health Foundation, a not-for-profit consortium charting an innovative healthcare model in India.

== Other activities ==
Gopalakrishnan instituted the Gopalakrishnan–NTU Presidential Postdoctoral Fellowships, focused on Industry 4.0, Smart Cities.

He supports young researchers in India through the Pratiksha Trust Young Investigators Award at IISc, Pratiksha Trust Scholarship and travel grants for Winter Schools on Quantitative Systems Biology at ICTS, and the Young Faculty Recognition Award and Travel Grants at IIT Madras.

Gopalakrishnan established the Gopalakrishnan–Deshpande Centre for Innovation and Entrepreneurship at IIT Madras in August 2017, to be able to solve India's society's problems by applying the full capabilities of the scientific and technological knowledge of Indian academic institutions through world class innovation and entrepreneurship.

Gopalakrishnan supports the nurturing of livelihoods of farmers through programs like the Naandi Foundation and Centre for Collective Development.

He has supported several interesting history projects – such as the History of Indian IT through itihaasa.com and a research project on History of Mathematics in India at IIT Gandhinagar.
