= List of School of Oriental and African Studies people =

This is a list of School of Oriental and African Studies people, including alumni, former and current members of staff. The School of Oriental and African Studies (SOAS) at the University of London has many notable alumni in positions of authority around the world. The university is particularly well known for educating royalty, diplomats and academics.

== Royalty and nobility ==
- Prince Mateen of Brunei – member of the Bruneian royal family
- Princess Muta-Wakkilah of Brunei – member of the Bruneian royal family
- Princess Wijdan Ali of Jordan
- Anthony Brooke, Rajah Muda of Sarawak
- Princess Maria Laura of Belgium, Archduchess of Austria-Este
- Mette-Marit, Crown Princess of Norway
- Princess Muzna bint Ghalib Al Qu'aiti
- Sultan Salahuddin, King of Malaysia 1999–2001
- Abdulaziz bin Turki al Faisal – Grandson of King Faisal of Saudi Arabia
- Princess Lalla Oulaya Benharbit - Granddaughter of King Mohammed VI of Morocco
- Milo Arthur Johnson - Eldest Son of former British Prime Minister Boris Johnson
- Fahda bint Saud Al Saud - Saudi royal and artist.

== Government and politics ==
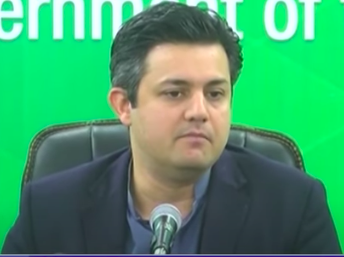
Hammad Azhar, former Finance Minister of Pakistan

- Aung San Suu Kyi, Nobel Peace Prize Laureate and Member of the Burmese Parliament
- Luisa Diogo, former Prime Minister of Mozambique
- Bisher Al-Khasawneh, current Prime Minister of Jordan
- Bülent Ecevit, former Prime Minister of Turkey
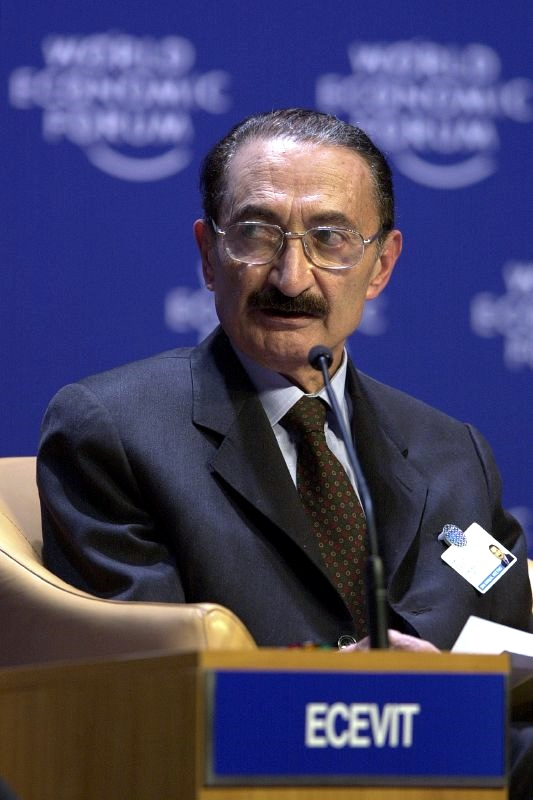
  Bülent Ecevit, who was Prime Minister of Turkey four times between 1974 and 2002
- John Atta Mills, former President of Ghana
- Justice Miangul Hassan Aurangzeb, Judge Islamabad High court, Pakistan
- Hammad Azhar, Pakistani Barrister and former Finance minister of Pakistan
- Iqra Choudhary, member of parliament of India
- Mohamed Jameel Ahmed, fourth Vice President of the Maldives
- Francis K. Butagira, Ambassador and Permanent Representative, Mission of the Republic of Uganda to the United Nations
- Hugh Carless, UK Ambassador to Venezuela
- Johnnie Carson, US Assistant Secretary of State for African Affairs and former US Ambassador to Kenya, Zimbabwe and Uganda
- Hüseyin Çelik, Turkish Minister of Education and Member of Parliament
- Kraisak Choonhavan, former Senator in the Senate of Thailand
- Herbert Chitepo, first Black Rhodesian barrister
- Femi Fani-Kayode, former Minister of Culture and Tourism and former Minister of Aviation in Nigeria
- Francesca P. Albanese, United Nations Special Rapporteur on the Occupied Palestinian Territories
- Sir Leslie Fielding, former British diplomat
- Shreela Flather, Baroness Flather, teacher, politician
- David Hannay, Baron Hannay of Chiswick, British diplomat
- Lord Jay of Ewelme, civil servant
- Zairil Khir Johari, Member of the Malaysian Parliament
- Jemima Khan, UK Ambassador to UNICEF
- Idris Kutigi, Chief Justice of the Supreme Court of Nigeria
- David Lammy, Member of the British Parliament and former minister
- Gunapala Malalasekera, Sri Lankan Ambassador to UK, Canada and Soviet Union
- Sir Robin McLaren, UK Ambassador to China and the Philippines
- Emma McCune, British foreign aid worker
- Dan Mokonyane, South African activist
- Margie Moran, chairperson of the Cultural Center of the Philippines and Miss Universe 1973
- Maajid Nawaz, co-founder and executive director of Quilliam, the world's first counter-extremism think tank
- Samia Nkrumah, Ghanaian Member of Parliament
- Sylvester Umaru Onu, Judge of the Supreme Court of Nigeria
- Aaron Mike Oquaye, Minister of Communication in Ghana
- Amal Pepple, Minister of Housing, Lands and Urban Development in Nigeria and former Head of the Nigerian Civil Service
- Enoch Powell, British politician
  British parliamentarian Enoch Powell
- Quinton Quayle, UK Ambassador to the Kingdom of Thailand and to Lao People's Democratic Republic
- Atiur Rahman, Governor of Central Bank, Bangladesh
- Sir Shridath Ramphal, Secretary-General for the Commonwealth
- Walter Rodney, historian and Guyanese political activist
- Gita Sahgal, writer and journalist, film director, and human rights activist
- Alan Senitt, political activist for homosexual rights
- Ivor Stanbrook, Member of the British Parliament and diplomat
- Hassan Taqizadeh, Member of Iranian Parliament and diplomat
- Sheikha Alya Ahmed Saif Al-Thani, Permanent Representative of the State of Qatar to the United Nations
- Sir John Vinelott, lawyer and judge
- Chris Trott, Ambassador to the Holy See
- Sir David Warren, former UK Ambassador to Japan
- Sir Michael Weir, former UK ambassador to Egypt
- Catherine West, Member of British Parliament
- Carter Page, American Political Consultant and former advisor to the Trump Administration
- Sir Ray Whitney, Member of British Parliament
- Michael C Williams, UN Special Coordinator for Lebanon
- David Wilson, Baron Wilson of Tillyorn, 27th Governor of Hong Kong
- Tim Yeo, UK Conservative Party politician
- Sir Edward Youde, 26th Governor of Hong Kong
- Bo Bo Nge, Burmese economist, vice governor of the Central Bank of Myanmar, and political prisoner
- Umran Chowdhury, Bangladeshi lawyer and historian

== Media/writers ==
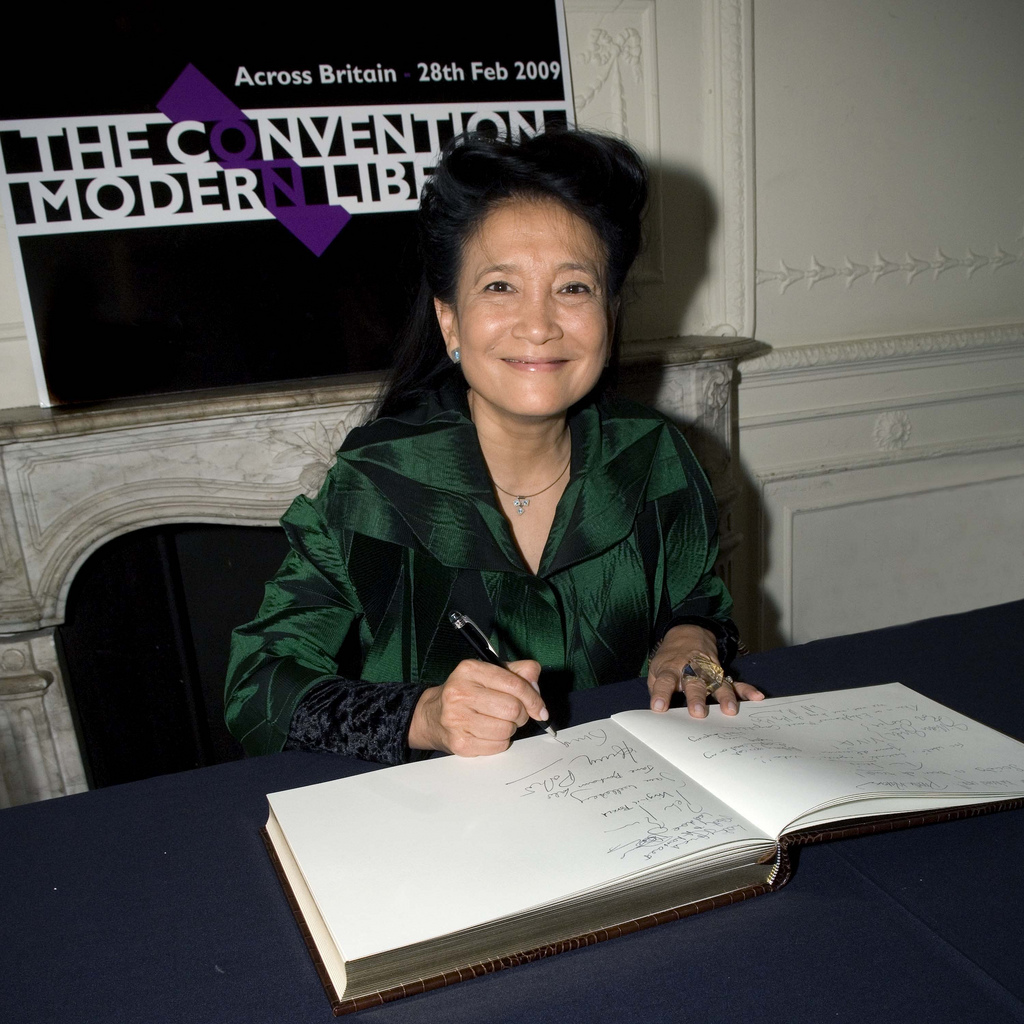
The Chinese-born British writer Jung Chang, who is best known for her family autobiography Wild Swans

- Jomana Alrashid, CEO, Saudi Research and Media Group
- Desi Anwar, journalist and presenter, Metro TV, Jakarta, Indonesia
- Abdel Bari Atwan, journalist, editor-in-chief of Al-Quds Al-Arabi newspaper in London
- Zeinab Badawi, journalist and presenter
- Peter Barakan, broadcaster
- Fatima Bhutto, author and journalist
- Martin Bright, journalist, political editor of the Jewish Chronicle
- Jason Chan Chi-san, actor and television presenter
- Jung Chang, writer
- Edward Chisholm, true crime author, memoirist
- Chris Crudelli, author and BBC television broadcaster
- Swapan Dasgupta, political analyst, journalist, columnist
- Hossein Derakhshan, Iranian blogger credited with starting the blogging revolution in Iran
- Jamal Elshayyal, news producer at Al Jazeera English
- Ghida Fakhry, journalist and news anchor at Al Jazeera English
- Faris Glubb, son of Glubb Pasha, activist, author and journalist
- James Harding, journalist, former editor of The Times
- Aidan Hartley, author and journalist
- Lindsey Hilsum, Channel 4 News correspondent and columnist for the New Statesman
- Dom Joly, television comedian and journalist
- Sabiha Al Khemir, Tunisian writer and expert in Islamic art
- Clive King, author
- Emma Larkin, American author
- Richard Mason, novelist
- Rabindra Mishra, editor, BBC Nepali Service
- Khyentse Norbu, filmmaker and Tibetan Buddhist Lama
- Taimur Rahman, Member CentComm Communist Mazdoor Kissan Party
- Andrew Robinson, author and journalist
- Gita Sahgal, writer and journalist, film director, and human rights activist
- Saira Shah, journalist and filmmaker
- Freya Stark, travel writer
- Christopher Sykes, author
- Sherine Tadros, al Jazeera English correspondent
- Rupert Wingfield-Hayes, journalist and broadcaster

== Academics ==
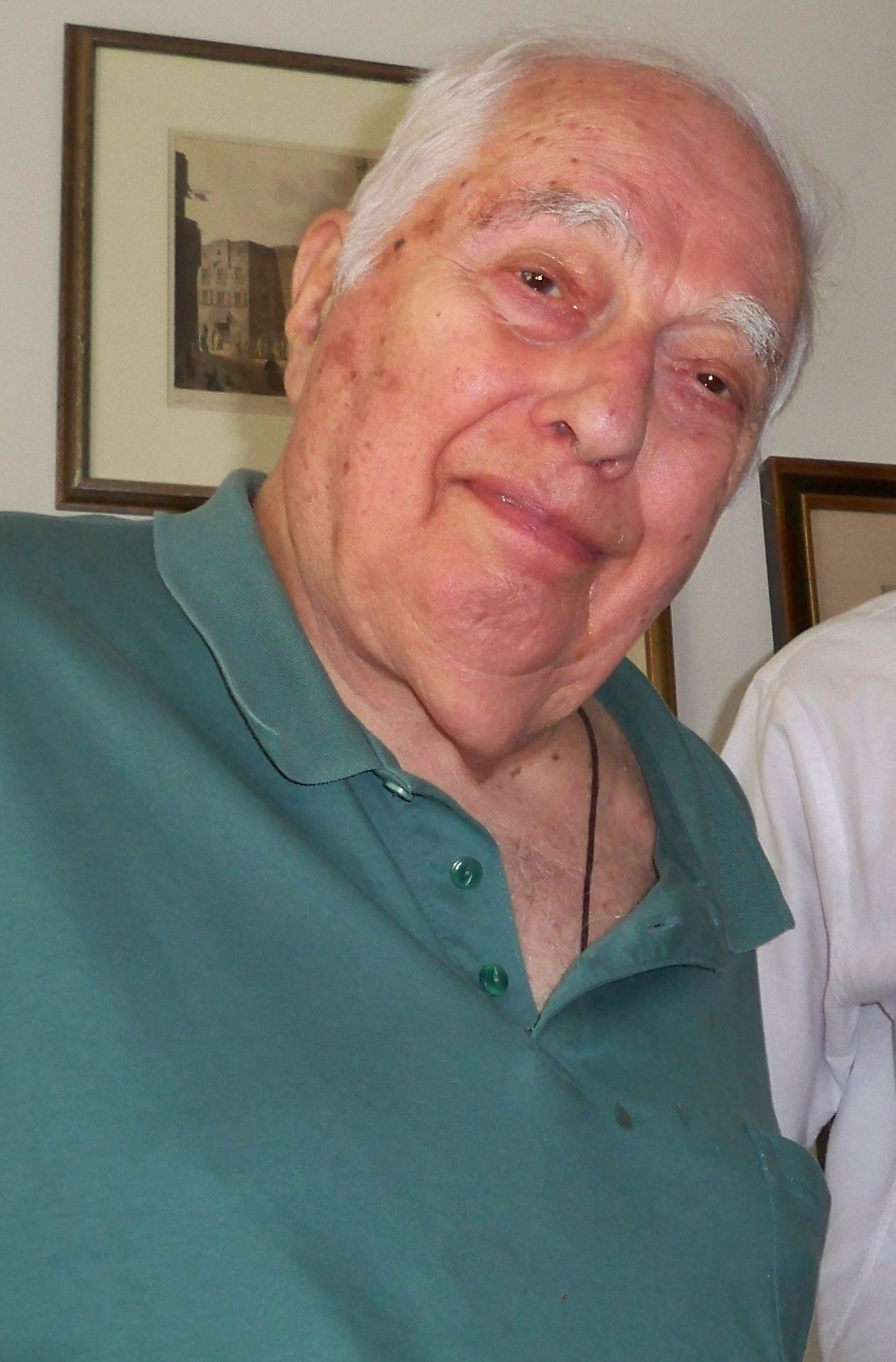
Bernard Lewis, renowned orientalist

- Hakim Adi, historian and scholar specializing in African affairs
- Michael Vaillancourt Aris, historian
- Suniti Kumar Chattopadhyay, considered to be the greatest Bengali linguist and grammarian
- Sushil Kumar De, Indian polymath and author
- Mario Aguilar, Oromo scholar and theologian
- Akbar Ahmed, author, diplomat and scholar of contemporary Islam
- Ali M. Ansari, historian, Iran expert, professor
- Amira Bennison, historian of the Middle East
- Charles Otto Blagden, linguist
- Issa J. Boullata, Arabic literature and Qur'anic studies,
- Urvashi Butalia, historian, feminist, founder and director of Kali for Women
- Hazel Carter (linguist), Linguist, known for her work on the Bantu languages, Shona, Kongo and Tonga.
- Gus Casely-Hayford, curator, cultural historian
- K. N. Chaudhuri, historian, author, creative writer, and graphic artist
- George N. Clements, linguist
- Craig Clunas, art historian, Professor of History of Art at the University of Oxford
- Hugh E. Conway, American economist and college professor
- Simon Digby, oriental scholar
- Frank Dikötter, Dutch historian
- Ronald P. Dore, sociologist
- Diana L. Eck, comparative religion and Indian Studies
- Dafydd Fell, British political scientist writing extensively on politics of Taiwan.
- Antony Flew, philosopher
- David SG Goodman, scholar of contemporary China
- Wang Gungwu, Chinese historian
- Sir Martin Harris, educationalist
- Fred Halliday, historian, international relations
- Ian Hancock, linguist and Romani scholar
- Betty Heimann, Indologist
- Anthony Hyman, academic, writer and Islamicist
- Mohammad Hashim Kamali, Islamic Scholar and Professor of Law
- Robert Graham Irwin, historian and writer on Arabic literature
- Marsden Jones, Islamic scholar
- Samten Karmay, Tibetologist, expert on Bon religion, CNRS
- Kusuma Karunaratne, Sinhalese language and literature
- Nick Knight, Professor of Asian Studies
- Gregory B. Lee, Professor of Chinese Studies at the University of St Andrews
- Trevor LeGassick, Professor of Arabic Literature at University of Michigan
- Bernard Lewis, Islamic scholar and Emeritus Professor at Princeton University, USA
- Victor Lieberman, Southeast Asian historian
- Martin Lings, English Muslim scholar and author
- Michael Loewe, sinologist
- David Neil MacKenzie, scholar of Iranian languages
- Victor Mair, sinologist
- Nur Masalha, author, historian, editor and Middle East scholar
- Duncan McCargo, Southeast Asian Politics
- Syed Muhammad Naquib al-Attas, philosopher
- Ian Nish, Japanese studies
- Farish Noor, academic, historian specialised in Southeast Asian region
- Ben Pimlott, historian, biographer
- Ambeth Ocampo, historian specializing in Rizal studies and Philippine history
- Susan Oosthuizen, Emeritus Professor of Medieval Archaeology at the University of Cambridge
- Martin Orwin, author, scholar, and poet
- James R. Russell, Armenian Studies
- Kamal Salibi, Lebanese historian and professor
- Tsering Shakya, historian and Tibetologist
- Ram Sharan Sharmam historian of Ancient India
- Alireza Shapour Shahbazi, prominent Persian archaeologist, Iranologist, world expert on Achaemenid archaeology
- Ninian Smart, religious studies
- Patrick Sookhdeo, theologian and Anglican canon
- Isolde Standish, Film theorist specialised in East Asia
- Romila Thapar, Indian historian
- Farouk Topan, director of the Swahili Centre at the Aga Khan University
- Thomas Trautmann, historian
- Konrad Tuchscherer, historian
- Than Tun, historian of Burma
- Andrew Turton, anthropologist, specialised on Thailand and Tai peoples
- Giles Ji Ungpakorn, former university lecturer at Chulalongkorn University
- Ivan van Sertima, historian and anthropologist, professor of African studies at Rutgers University
- William Montgomery Watt, historian and Islamic scholar
- Timothy J. Winter, aka Abdul Hakim Murad, Islamic scholar, author and teacher
- Ehsan Yarshater, Iranian studies
- Rosemarie Said Zahlan, historian, writer on the Persian Gulf states
- Syed Muhammad Naquib al-Attas, prominent contemporary Muslim philosopher and thinker from Malaysia

== Music and the arts ==
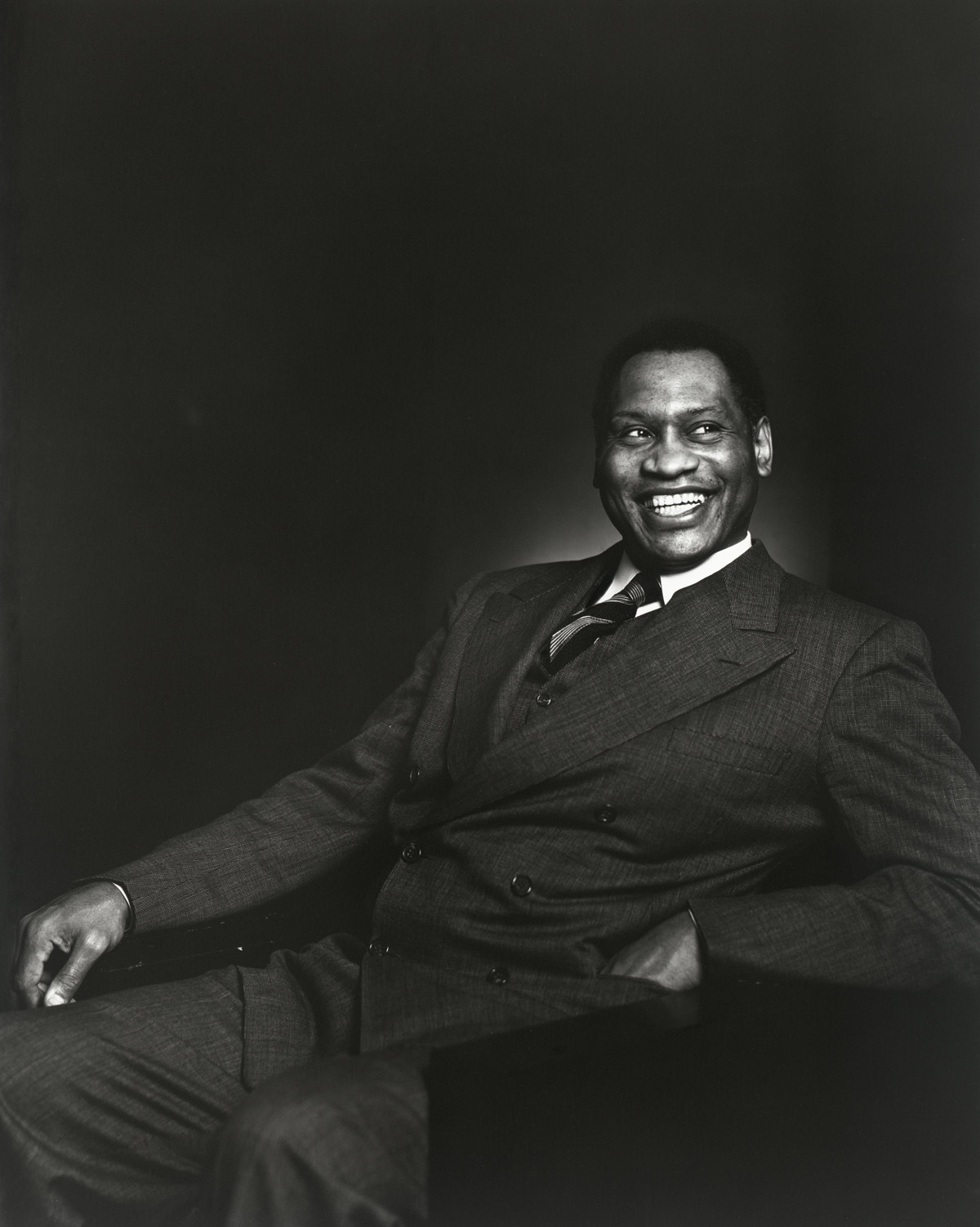
Paul Robeson, musician and civil rights activist

- Khyam Allami, musician, oud player
- M. K. Asante, writer and filmmaker
- Thurston Clarke, writer
- Raman Mundair, writer, artist, poet and playwright
- Olu Oguibe, artist and academic
- Derwin Panda, musician and producer
- Paul Robeson, musician, writer and civil rights activist
- Himanshu Suri aka "Heems", rapper, member of Das Racist
- Gareth Williams, musician, member of This Heat
- Cheng Yu, musician
- Jason Chan, Actor and Television Presenter
- Poompat Iam-Samang, Thai actor and model
- Dom Joly, writer, comedian and former diplomat
- Nick Mulvey, musician

== Business and finance ==
- Fred Eychaner, American businessman, philanthropist
- Sir Joseph Hotung, businessman, art collector, and philanthropist
- Lesetja Kganyago, Governor of the South African Reserve Bank
- Peter Parker, chairman of the British Railways Board
- Atiur Rahman, Governor of Bangladesh Bank, the central bank of the country
- Sir Dermot de Trafford, banker, businessman and aristocrat

== Religion ==
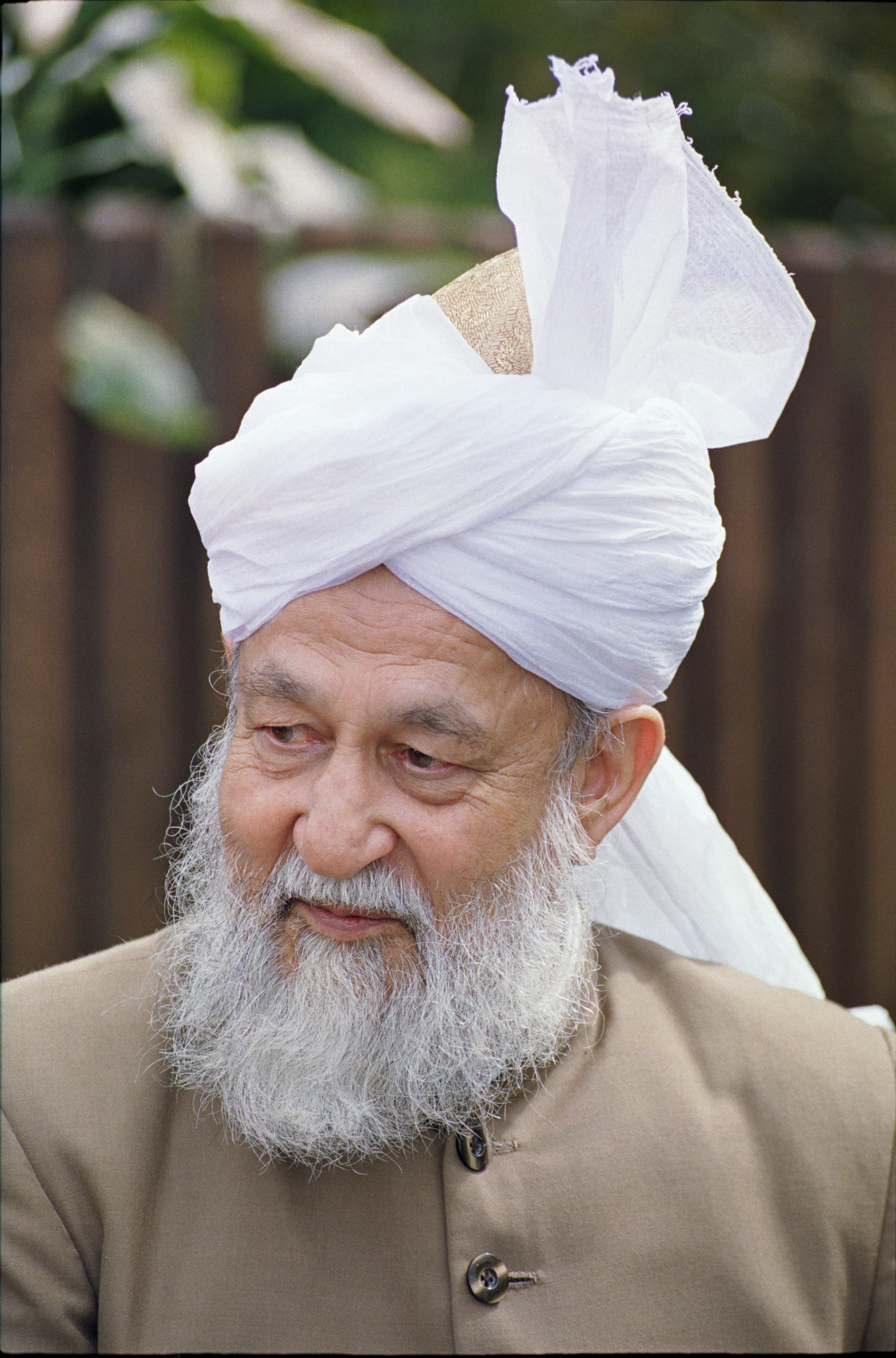
Mirza Tahir Ahmad, fourth Khalifa of the Ahmadiyya

- Mirza Tahir Ahmad, fourth khalifa of the Worldwide Ahmadiyya Muslim Community
- Andrew Bertie, Grand Master of the Sovereign Military Order of Malta, and distant relative of Queen Elizabeth II.
- Michael L. Fitzgerald, Cardinal, President of the Pontifical Council for Interreligious Dialogue 2002–2006, Apostolic Nuncio to Egypt (from 2006)
- Maurice Noël Léon Couve de Murville, Archbishop of Birmingham 1982–1999
- Sheikh Abdul Qayum, scholar and Chief Imam of the East London Mosque
- Hammalawa Saddhatissa, Buddhist Monk of Sri Lanka
- David Young, Bishop of Ripon 1977–1999

== Others ==
- Jack Briggs, soldier, Arabist and police officer
- Charlie Bronks, sustainability executive and former England international rugby union player, part of the winning squad at the 1994 Women's Rugby World Cup
- Josh Carrott, YouTuber
- Sir Hamish Forbes, Bt, British Army officer
- Ngozi Fulani, educator and women's rights advocate
- Maro Itoje, England rugby union international (current student)
- Raju Kendre, Social Entrepreneur
- Samantha Lewthwaite, alleged mastermind of the Westgate shopping mall attack and widow to 7 July 2005 London bombings perpetrator Germaine Lindsay. Currently wanted by INTERPOL and Kenyan authorities.
- Gordan Lonsdale, Soviet Spy
- William Montgomery McGovern, Inspiration for the character Indiana Jones
- Margarita Moran-Floirendo, Miss Universe 1973 representing the Philippines
- Sarina Prabasi, CEO of WaterAid America

== Notable faculty and staff ==
=== Faculty of Law and Social Sciences ===
- Gilbert Achcar, Globalisation
- Gunnar Beck, EU lawyer and Member of the European Parliament (MEP).
- Malcolm Caldwell, Southeast Asian Economic History
- Ben Fine, Economics
- Mushtaq Khan, Economics
- Laleh Khalili, Middle East Politics
- Alfredo Saad-Filho, Marxian economist
- Guy Standing, Economics
- Philip Stott, Biogeography
- Charles R. H. Tripp, Middle East Politics

=== Faculty of Arts and Humanities ===
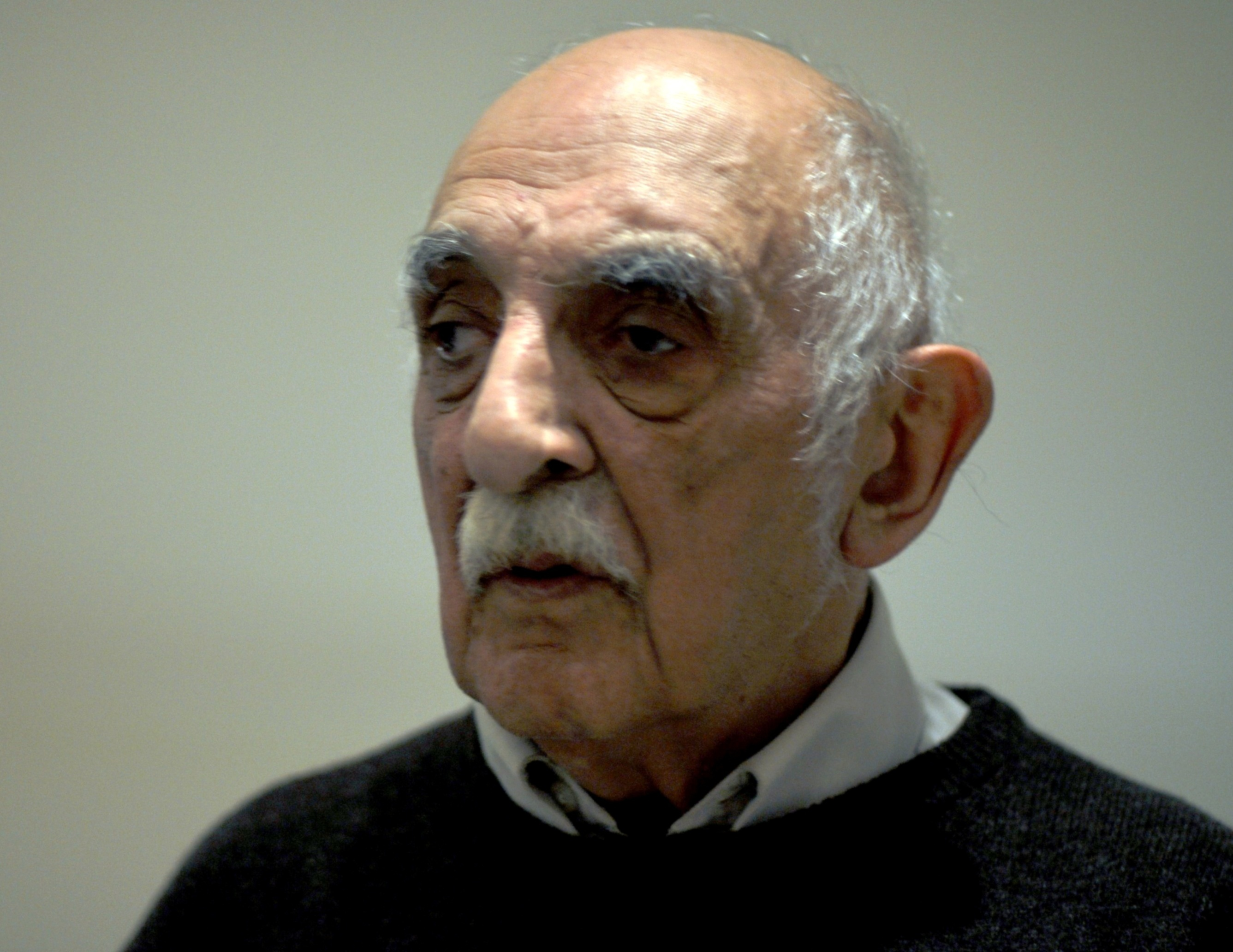
Alexander Piatigorsky, Russian philosopher

- Arthur Llewellyn Basham, Indian History
- K. N. Chaudhuri, Indian History
- Michael Cook, Islamic History
- Patricia Crone, Islamic History
- Lucy Durán, African Music
- Nelida Fuccaro, Middle Eastern History
- William Hale (professor), Turkey and Turkish politics
- D. G. E. Hall, History of South East Asia
- Gerald Hawting, History of the Near Middle East
- Dick Hodder, geographer
- Jung Chang, writer and historian, author of Wild Swans
- Nasser David Khalili, Islamic Art
- Roland Oliver, African History
- Alexander Piatigorsky, History of South Asia
- Timon Screech, Japanese art, architecture and history
- R. G. Tiedemann, historian of Christianity in China
- Andrew Turton, anthropology and South East Asian studies
- John Wansbrough, Islamic History

=== Faculty of Languages and Cultures ===
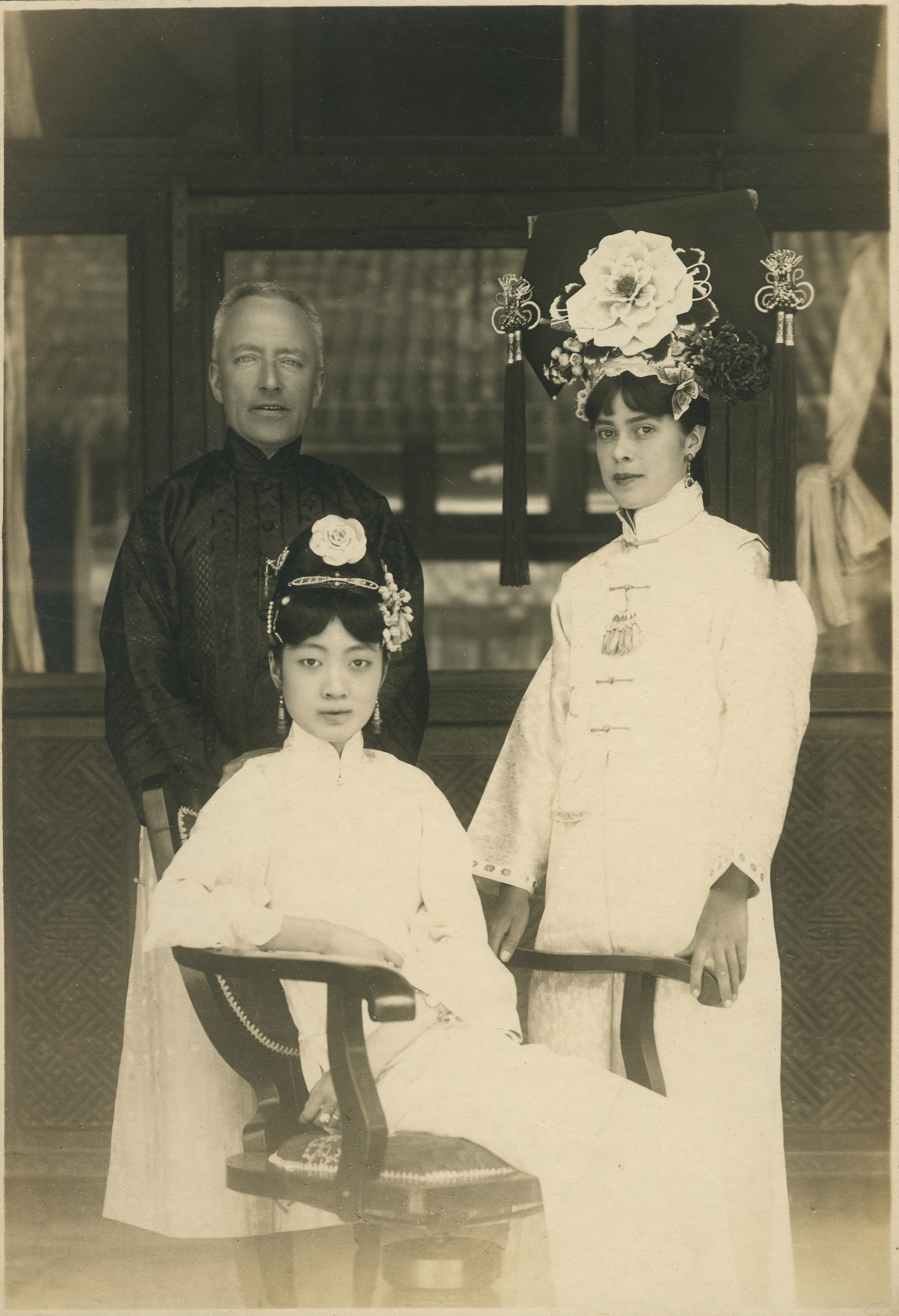
Reginald Johnston, Chinese linguist and tutor to the last Emperor of China

- Muhammad Abdel-Haleem, Islamic Studies
- Shirin Akiner, Central Asian Studies
- David Appleyard, Languages of the Horn of Africa
- Arthur John Arberry, Persian Studies
- Charles Bawden, Mongolian Studies
- Mary Boyce, Iranian Studies
- J. Percy Bruce, Chinese
- Monik Charette, linguist and phonologist
- Evangeline Edwards, Chinese language and literature
- John Rupert Firth, Linguistics
- Sir Hamilton Gibb, Orientalist
- Angus Charles Graham, Classical Chinese
- Alfred Guillaume, Islamic Studies
- Walter Bruno Henning, Iranian Studies
- Michel Hockx, China and Inner Asia Studies
- Reginald Johnston, Chinese language and literature
- Hugh N. Kennedy, Arabic
- Philip G. Kreyenbroek, Iranian studies
- Ann Lambton, Iranian Studies
- Wendy Doniger O'Flaherty, Indian religion
- Patrick Geoffrey O'Neill, Japanese
- Soe Tjen Marching, academic, activist, and a composer of avant-garde music from Indonesia
- Vladimir Minorsky, Iranian Studies
- David Marshall Lang, Caucasian Studies
- Bernard Lewis, Middle East Studies
- John Ralston Marr, South Asian Studies
- Tudor Parfitt, Modern Jewish Studies
- Xiao Qian, China and Inner Asia Studies
- William Radice, Bengali language and literature
- Christopher Reynolds, Dhivehi and Sinhala language
- Ralph Russell, Urdu language and literature
- Christopher Shackle, Languages and Cultures of Northwest India
- Nicholas Sims-Williams, Iranian and Central Asian Studies
- David Snellgrove, Tibetan Studies
- Arthur Stanley Tritton, Arabic language and literature
- Kenneth Strong, Japanese
- Paul Thompson, Classical Chinese
- Edward Ullendorff, Ethiopian Studies and Semitic Languages
- Arthur Waley, Japan and China Studies
- Richard Olaf Winstedt, Malay language and literature
