= Farouk Topan =

Tanzanian linguist

- Born: 1940 (age 85–86)
- Occupations: Director of the Swahili Centre, Aga Khan University

Academic background
- Education: School of Oriental and African Studies

Academic work
- Discipline: Swahili language and literature
- Institutions: School of Oriental and African Studies, Institute of Ismaili Studies, Aga Khan University

Farouk Mohamedhusein Tharia Topan (born 1940) is the director of the Swahili Centre at the Aga Khan University. He is a specialist in the language and literature of the Swahili people. He has taught at the University of Dar es Salaam, the Institute of Ismaili Studies, and the School of Oriental and African Studies.

== Early life and education ==
After completing his basic education, Topan travelled to England at the age of 19 and took a degree in anthropology, linguistics and literature at the School of Oriental and African Studies (SOAS) in the University of London. He subsequently completed his PhD there on spirit possession which he received in 1972 for a thesis titled "Oral literature in a ritual setting: the role of spirit songs in a spirit-mediumship cult of Mombasa, Kenya." The thesis looked specifically at the kipemba cult in Changamwe, Kenya, and the practices of the pungwa and the types of oral literature produced by the cult.

== Career ==
Topan is a specialist in the language and literature of the Swahili. He has written two plays, Mfalme Juha (1971), and Aliyeonja Pepo (1973), the second of which was published in an English translation in 1980.

His first academic job was in 1968, at the University of Dar es Salaam where he taught Swahili literature in Kiswahili. In 1969 he started a BA in Swahili and linguistics with professor Abdul Aziz. In 1970 he became chairperson of the department of Swahili at the University of Dar es Salaam. After completing his PhD in 1972 he worked at the University of Nairobi, in London, and then at the University of Riyadh. Among his students at Dar es Salaam and Nairobi were the future playwrights Hussein Ibrahim and John Habwe.

He was a research scholar and head of the teacher training programme at the Institute of Ismaili Studies in London from 1977 to 1993 and lectured at SOAS until 2006. As of 2018, Topan is the director of the Swahili Centre at the Aga Khan University.

He is the editor with Pat Caplan of Swahili Modernities. Culture, Politics and Identity on the East Coast of Africa (Africa World Press, 2004).

Topan has spoken about the greater academic interest in Kiswahili outside Africa than within, perhaps due to a lack of economic incentives to promote Kiswahili inside Africa, and has described the English language as "the elephant in the room" as far as the spread of Kiswahili within east Africa is concerned as people prefer English which is seen as a more global language.

== Selected publications ==
=== Academic ===
- "Modern Swahili Poetry", Bulletin of the School of Oriental and African Studies, Vol. 37, No. 1 (February 1974), pp. 175–187.
- "Vugo: A Virginity Celebration Ceremony Among the Swahili of Mombasa", Journal of African Cultural Studies, Vol. 8, No. 1 (January 1995), pp. 87–107.
- "Biography Writing in Swahili", History in Africa, Vol. 24, p. 299 (January 1997)
- "Some Spirits Heal, Others Only Dance: A Journey of Human Selfhood in an African Village", The International Journal of African Historical Studies, Vol. 71, No. 4 (January 2001), p. 707.
- "Projecting Islam: Narrative in Swahili Poetry", Journal of African Cultural Studies, Vol. 14, No. 1, (June 2001), pp. 107–119.
- Swahili Modernities. Culture, Politics and Identity on the East Coast of Africa. Africa World Press, 2004. (Editor with Pat Caplan)
- "Why Does a Swahili Writer Write? Euphoria, Pain, and Popular Aspirations in Swahili Literature", Research in African Literatures, Vol. 37, No. 3 (September 2006), pp. 103–119.

=== Fiction ===
- Mfalme Juha. Oxford University Press, Dar es Salaam, 1971. ISBN 0195721969 OCLC 174457758
- Aliyeonja Pepo. 1973. OCLC 917075793
- A Taste of Heaven (Aliyeonja Pepo). Tanzania Publishing House, Dar es Salaam, 1980. (translated by Martin Mkombo) OCLC 10756973
