= ASEAN Integrated QR Code Payment System =

Regional cardless payment system

The ASEAN Integrated QR Code Payment System is a 2023 initiative by ASEAN for an integrated QR code payment systems. It was part of ASEAN's Local Currency Transaction (LCT) Framework. The initiative was aimed at using local currencies and reduced dependence on certain currencies, particularly the US dollar, in cross-border transaction among ASEAN countries.

== History ==
At the 10th joint meeting of the ASEAN Finance Ministers and Central Bank Governors, held in Jakarta, Indonesia, on 25 August 2023, the group committed to integrating each country's QR payment systems as part of the Financial Integration and Liberalisation agenda.

As of 2024, the following QR payment systems were or would soon be included in the integrated payment system:

Country	QR Code Payment System	Authority/Owner	National QR Integration Launch Date	Cross-Border QR Linkage Launch Date	Notes
Malaysia	DuitNow QR	PayNet and Bank Negara Malaysia	10 December 2018	Thailand (2021); Singapore (2023); Indonesia (2023); Cambodia (2024)	DuitNow allows all participating banks and e-wallets in Malaysia to use the same QR Code for transactions. It is launched by PayNet under the Bank Negara Malaysia's Interoperable Credit Transfer Framework (ICTF). Some of the banks and e-wallets that support this payment system are Maybank, Hong Leong Bank, CIMB, HSBC, Touch 'n Go eWallet, GrabPay, Setel, ShopeePay, OCBC, UOB, ICBC, and more.
Cambodia	KHQR	Soramitsu and National Bank of Cambodia	26 June 2020	Thailand (2020); Laos (2023); Vietnam (2023); Malaysia (2024)	KHQR is Cambodia national QR payment standard part of Bakong System launched on 26 June 2020. KHQR is developed by National Bank of Cambodia and Soramitsu (Japanese-Swiss fintech company).
Laos	LAO QR	Bank of the Lao PDR	29 January 2020	Cambodia (2023); Thailand (2024); Vietnam (2025)	LAO QR is a unified QR payment system in Laos. The Bank of the Lao PDR held an official launch on 29 January 2020, with the presence of BOL Governor, Mr. Sonexay Sithphaxay, senior officials from the Bank of Lao PDR, representatives from relevant ministries, and commercial banks financial institutions, Fintech, WB Group, and Union Pay.
Myanmar	MMQR (MyanmarPay)	Central Bank of Myanmar	4 March 2025	-	MyanmarPay (MMQR) is a unified QR code payment system in Myanmar. MMQR ensures seamless interoperability across banks, mobile wallets, and payment platforms. MyanmarPay owned and regulated by the Central Bank of Myanmar and operated by PayPlus Co., Ltd.
Philippines	QR Ph (National QR Code Standard)	PPMI and Bangko Sentral ng Pilipinas	20 November 2019	-	QR Ph is the QR code standard in the Philippines, approved by the Philippines Payment Management, inc. (PPMI) in accordance with circular 1055 of the Bangko Sentral ng Pilipinas. The system is based on the Europay-Mastercard-VISA (EMV) standard, allowing one QR Code to serve transactions from different banks and e-wallets.
Indonesia	QRIS	Bank Indonesia	17 August 2019	Thailand (2022); Malaysia (2023); Singapore (2023)	QRIS combines all the separate QR codes from different payment services into a single QR code that merchants can use to receive payments from any e-wallets or banks that support QRIS. All payment services in Indonesia are required to support QRIS, including GoPay, OVO, Dana, LinkAja, ShopeePay, BCA, BNI, BRI, Mandiri, BSI, Bank Muamalat, Bank Mega, Allo Bank, Bank Danamon, Permata Bank, CIMB Niaga, SeaBank, MNC Bank, etc.
Singapore	SGQR+ (NETS QR)	MAS and IMDA	17 September 2018	Thailand (2021); Malaysia (2023); Indonesia (2023)	SGQR combines multiple QR codes used by multiple payment services in Singapore, including DBS Bank, PayNow and NETS, into one QR code. This scheme is co-owned by MAS and IMDA. SGQR+ is the successor of SGQR, it supports interoperability and cross-border function.
Thailand	Thai QR Payment (PromptPay QR)	Bank of Thailand	30 August 2017	Cambodia (2020); Vietnam (2021); Malaysia (2021); Singapore (2021); Indonesia (2022); Laos (2024)	Thai QR Payment (PromptPay) integrates QR payment systems in Thailand. It was launched by the Bank of Thailand.
Vietnam	VietQR	NAPAS	15 June 2021	Thailand (2021); Cambodia (2023); Laos (2025)	VietQR is the national QR code payment standard for Vietnam, launched as a collaborative effort by the National Payment Corporation of Vietnam (NAPAS) in partnership with several major banks, including Vietcombank, BIDV, VietinBank, and Agribank. VietQR aims to streamline digital transactions across various financial platforms by using a unified QR code format that supports interoperability among different banks and e-wallets.
