= Eve Edwards =

Eve Edwards may refer to:

- Pen name of Julia Golding, British novelist
- Evangeline Edwards (1888–1957), Professor Chinese at SOAS, University of London
