= Brooke Ackerly =

American political scientist

Brooke A. Ackerly
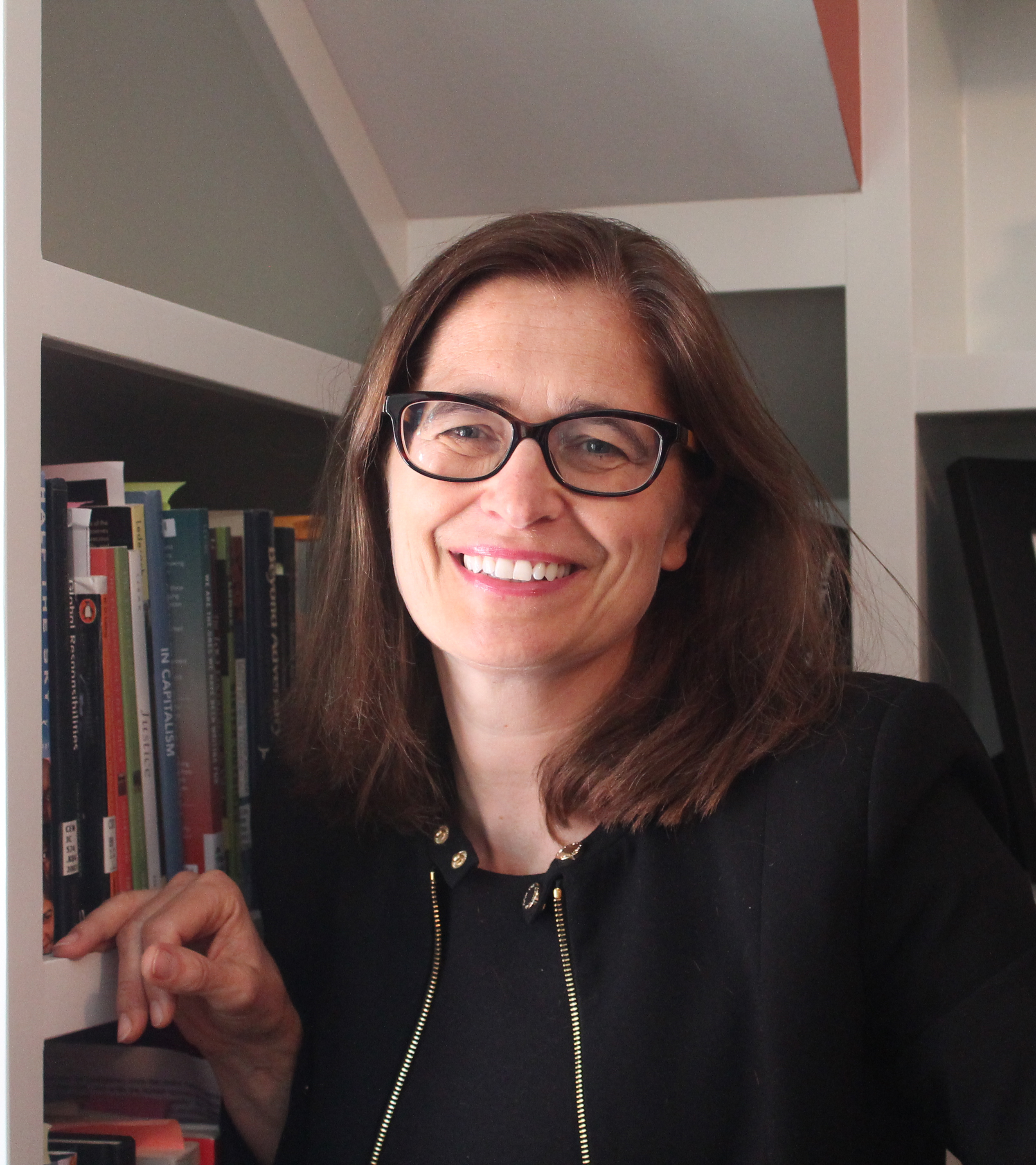
- Brooke A. Ackerly
- Occupation: Political Scientist

Academic background
- Education: Stanford University

Brooke A. Ackerly is an American political scientist and Professor of Political Science at Vanderbilt University with affiliations to the Human and Organizational Development Department, Law School, Philosophy Department, and Women's and Gender Studies Program, noted for her research on grounded normative theory, feminist theory, feminist international relations, and scholar activism.

== Education ==
Ackerly earned her BA in French and Economics from Williams College in 1988, her M.A. in political science from Stanford University in 1993, and her Ph.D. from Stanford University in 1997.

== Career ==
Ackerly was a Visiting assistant professor at the University of California, Los Angeles from 1997 to 2000 and completed a post-doctoral Research Fellowship at the University of Southern California from 2000 to 2001 before her employment at Vanderbilt University starting in 2001. She became associate professor in 2007 and Full Professor in 2017. She is an Editor-in-chief at the International Feminist Journal of Politics and Chair-elect in the Human Rights Organized Section of the American Political Science Association. Ackerly is on the editorial board of academic journals such as the Journal of Politics, Political Research Quarterly, Human Rights and Human Welfare, and Politics, Groups and Identities. She is the winner of the Vanderbilt College of Arts and Science Graduate Teaching Award. She is the founder of the Global Feminisms Collaborative, a group of scholars and activists developing ways to collaborate on applied research for social justice.

== Research ==
Brooke Ackerly's research has crossed between political theory and international relations, with special interest in gender issues and political methodology. One of Ackerly's biggest contributions has been theorizing universal human rights, finding a middle ground between relativism and essentialism built through the insights of women's human rights activists. Her Political Theory and Feminist Social Criticism (Cambridge 2000) builds from field research, feminist theory, and deliberative democracy theory, laying out a methodology for and theory of feminist social criticism. Her Universal Human Rights in a World of Difference (Cambridge 2008) builds on this theorizing, but with an emphasis on and attention to difference, disagreement, and diversity. With Jacqui True and Maria Stern, Ackerly edited Feminist Methodologies for International Relations (Cambridge 2006), which lays out both a theoretical approach to feminist methodologies for international relations and a variety of possible methods to be used. She has contributed to debates about the utility of quantitative methods for feminist theorizing, foci on people-centric notions of rights, discussions about reflexivity in research, and the role of deliberation in politics generally and feminist politics specifically, in Doing Feminist Research with Jacqui True (Palgrave 2010).

Ackerly has also contributed theories of human rights, especially as it relates to global justice. Her newest book Just Responsibility: A Human Rights Theory of Global Justice (Oxford 2018), examines the difference between moral responsibility and political responsibility, and challenges conventional norms about responsibility and its basis in volition and cognition.

Ackerly has been at the forefront of recent developments in the "grounded normative theory” methodological approach. Grounded normative theory involves the direct incorporation and/or analysis of empirical research in the processes of normative theorizing. The approach dates at least to Jane Mansbridge’s 1980 monograph cum 1983 book, Beyond Adversary Democracy, which incorporated original field work at New England town meetings and a crisis helpline center. Ackerly has been perhaps the leading recent practitioner and proponent of the approach, especially in a more critical, solidaristic vein, where the scholar theorizes with those engaged in struggles over justice and social recognition. Further, for Ackerly, grounded normative theorizing follows grounded theory as it has been more broadly developed in sociology and cognate disciplines - the method is inductive, developing normative theories from the empirical context upward, rather than bringing theoretical claims to the context. Ackerly began laying the theoretical groundwork for her own grounded interventions in her 2000 monograph, Political Theory and Feminist Social Criticism. By 2008’s Universal Human Rights in a World of Difference, she was conducting and incorporating extensive field work involving participants at World Social Forums. Her most recent monograph, Just Responsibility, presents a fully realized “feminist grounded normative theory approach.” It joins feminist methodologies and orientations to grounded normative theorizing. The book presents findings from Ackerly's interviews and data and content analysis of 125 grant applications from organizations focused on women's rights in 26 countries.
