= International Feminist Journal of Politics =

- Discipline: Politics, international relations
- Language: English
- Edited by: Brooke Ackerly, Elisabeth Jay Friedman, Krishna Menon, Marysia Zalewski

Publication details
- Publisher: Taylor and Francis
- Frequency: Quarterly
- Impact factor: 0.970 (2015)

Standard abbreviations
- ISO 4: Int. Fem. J. Politics

Indexing
- CODEN: IJOIED
- ISSN: 1461-6742 (print); 1468-4470 (web)
- LCCN: sn99033230
- OCLC no.: 43515877

Links
- Journal homepage; Online access; Online archive; IngentaConnect archive

The International Feminist Journal of Politics is a quarterly peer-reviewed academic journal covering international relations and international political economy with a focus on gender issues in global politics. The journal was established by Jan Jindy Pettman (Australian National University) in 1999. In 2020, the editors-in-chief are Brooke Ackerly (Vanderbilt University), Elisabeth Jay Friedman (University of San Francisco), Krishna Menon (Ambedkar University Delhi), and Marysia Zalewski (Cardiff University). Past editors include Heidi Hudson (University of the Free State), Laura Sjoberg (University of Florida), and Cynthia Weber (University of Sussex). The journal is published by Taylor and Francis.

== Origins ==
Gender as a subject of analysis noticeably increased in the mid-1990s in the study of international relations. At this time there was a significant focus on the ways in which conceptions of gender influenced language, policies, and processes occupying the international arena. The creation of the journal was a result of this feminist thinking building up in the areas of international politics. Key conferences that were a factor in perpetuating these ideals were the 1994 International Conference on Population and Development in Cairo, the 1993 World Conference on Human Rights in Vienna, and the 1995 Fourth World Conference on Women. At the 1996 meeting of the International Studies Association, Routledge representatives approached members of the Feminist Theory and Gender Studies section (FTGS) with the idea of a feminist journal, modeled on the recently launched journal, Feminist Economics.

The establishment of the journal was a collaborative effort headed by Jan Jindy Pettman in 1999. The editorial board was envisioned to be culturally diverse, featuring scholars in different cultural and ethnicity groups with a wide range of geographic representation.

== Indexing ==
According to the Journal Citation Reports, the journal has a 2015 impact factor of 0.970, ranking it 67th out of 161 journals in the category "Political Science" and 19th out of 40 journals in the category "Women's Studies".

== See also ==
- List of political science journals
- List of women's studies journals
