= Martha MacDonald =

Academic background
- Education: Boston College

Academic work
- Discipline: Feminist economics
- Institutions: St Mary's University

Notes
- Thesis Employment strategies of firm: the low-wage sector. (1983)

Martha Lorraine MacDonald is the professor of economics in the department of economics, St Mary's University, Halifax, Nova Scotia, Canada, and was the president of the International Association for Feminist Economics (IAFFE) from 2007 to 2008.

Her main areas of research are: economic restructuring, social security policy, gender and economy. She has spoken on numerous occasions in Canada's Standing Committee on the Status of Women, and in 2009 she co-edited Gender and the contours of precarious employment with Iain Campbell and Leah Vosko.

== Education ==
MacDonald gained her degree from Dalhousie University, Nova Scotia in 1971, she then went to the US to study for her masters (1975) and her doctorate (1983), both in economics, at Boston College, Chestnut Hill, Massachusetts.

== Selected bibliography ==
=== Books ===
- MacDonald, Martha; Connelly, Patricia (1990). Women and the labour force, 1986 Census of Canada Focus, Minister of Supply and Services. Vol. 4. Ottawa, Canada: Volumes 98-125 of DBS Catalogue, Statistics Canada. ISBN 9780660540177. In French as Les femmes et la population active published by Statistique Canada.
- MacDonald, Martha; McCrorie, James (1992). The constitutional future of the Prairie and Atlantic regions of Canada. Regina, Sask., Canada: Canadian Plains Research Center, University of Regina. ISBN 9780889770683.
- MacDonald, Martha; Campbell, Iain; Vosko, Leah (2009). Gender and the contours of precarious employment. London New York: Routledge. ISBN 9780415494540.

=== Chapters in books ===
- MacDonald, Martha; Connelly, M. Patricia; Murray Li, Tania; Parpart, Jane L (2000), "Feminism and development: theoretical perspectives", in Barriteau, Eudine; Connelly, M. Patricia; Parpart, Jane L (eds.), Theoretical perspectives on gender and development, Ottawa: International Development Research Centre (IDRC), pp. 51–160, ISBN 9780889369108
- MacDonald, Martha; Campbell, Iain; Vosko, Leah F (2009), "Introduction: gender and the concept of precarious employment", in MacDonald, Martha; Campbell, Iain; Vosko, Leah F (eds.), Gender and the contours of precarious employment, London New York: Routledge, pp. 1–25, ISBN 9780415494540
- MacDonald, Martha (2009), "Spatial dimensions of gendered precariousness: challenges for comparative analysis", in MacDonald, Martha; Campbell, Iain; Vosko, Leah F (eds.), Gender and the contours of precarious employment, London New York: Routledge, pp. 211–225, ISBN 9780415494540
- MacDonald, Martha (2009), "Income security for women: what about employment insurance?", in Cohen, Marjorie Griffith; Pulkingham, Jane (eds.), Public policy for women the state, income security, and labour market issues, Toronto Buffalo: University of Toronto Press, pp. 251–270, ISBN 9780802095008
- Reed, Maureen; Parkins, John R (2012), "Labour migration and mobility in Newfoundland: social transformation and community in three rural areas", in MacDonald, Martha; Sinclair, Peter; Walsh, Detra (eds.), Social transformation in rural Canada community, cultures, and collective action, Vancouver, Canada: UBC Press, pp. 110–130, ISBN 9780774823821

=== Journal articles ===
- MacDonald, Martha; Benería, Lourdes; Floro, Maria; Grown, Caren (2000). "Introduction: globalization and gender". Feminist Economics. 6 (3): vii–xviii. doi:10.1080/135457000750020100. S2CID 154930148.
- MacDonald, Martha; MacPhail, Fiona; Phipps, Shelley (December 2001). "Gender equity within families versus better targeting: an assessment of the family income supplement to employment insurance benefits". Canadian Public Policy. 27 (4): 423–446. doi:10.2307/3552535. JSTOR 3552535.
- MacDonald, Martha; et al. (2005). "Rural women in Canada (special issue)". Canadian Woman Studies. 24 (4): all.
- MacDonald, Martha; Neis, Barbara; Murray, Grant (2008). "State policy, livelihood protection and gender on Canada's East Coast". International Journal of Canadian Studies. 38 (38): 149–180. doi:10.7202/040810ar.
- MacDonald, Martha; Myers, Jan (April 2014). "Reciprocal relationships: the role of government and the social economy in the co-construction of social policy in Atlantic Canada". Canadian Public Policy. 40 (s1): 17–25. doi:10.3138/cpp.2011-065. S2CID 153333008.

=== Papers ===
- MacDonald, Martha (1983). Employment strategies of firm: the low-wage sector (Ph.D thesis). Michigan: Boston College. OCLC 63977432.
- MacDonald, Martha; Connelly, Patricia (1983). The role of women: development and change in the rural Nova Scotia economy. Halifax, Nova Scotia: Gorsebrook Research Institute for Atlantic Canada Studies, Saint Mary's University. OCLC 629901951. "No. 2-83"

== See also ==
- Feminist economics
- List of feminist economists

Non-profit organisation positions
Preceded by Edith Kuiper	President of the International Association for Feminist Economics; 2007–2008	Succeeded by Cecilia Conrad
