= Jane L. Parpart =

American social historian (born 1940)

- Born: Barbara Jane Little; 1940 (age 85–86); New Hampshire
- Other names: B. Jane Parpart, Barbara Jane Little Parpart, Jane Little Parpart, Jane Parpart
- Occupation: Academic

Jane L. Parpart (born 1940) is a social historian and academic whose focus is on gender and development with particular interest in the global south. Parpart was formerly the coordinator of women's and gender studies and the Lester B. Pearson Chair of international development studies at Dalhousie University in Nova Scotia. Her work has explored the rights of access and opportunity to socio-politico-economic stability and decision-making for men and women. She and her husband, political scientist Timothy M. Shaw, are jointly adjunct research fellows of the Department of Conflict Resolution, Human Security and Global Governance at the University of Massachusetts Boston.

== Early life and education ==
Barbara Jane "Jane" Little was born in New Hampshire in 1940 to Barbara (née Chase) and Elbert Payson Little. Her mother was from Rhode Island, and had been a teacher before marrying. Her father was a well-known physicist and pioneering computer scientist. Jane, the eldest of eight siblings, was followed by Elbert Jr., Eleanor, Elizabeth, Hannah, Eric, Katharyn, and William "Buck". The family lived in Exeter, New Hampshire until 1948 and then moved to West Newton, Massachusetts. Little graduated from Newton High School in 1957. She married Arthur K. Parpart Jr. and then earned a bachelor's degree from Pembroke College in Brown University in 1961. Continuing her education, Parpart earned a master's degree (1966) and PhD (1980) from Boston University in African studies.

== Career ==
In 1981, Parpart began working as an assistant professor in the history department at Fort Lewis College in Durango, Colorado. In the fall of 1983, she went to Halifax, Nova Scotia where she started her career at Dalhousie University, as a visiting professor. She worked her way up the ranks, becoming part of the regular staff by 1985 and president of the Dalhousie Women's Faculty Association. She was an associate professor and one of the women who helped formalize the women's studies courses at Dalhousie in 1988. Since 1982, courses had been offered and coordinated by Sue Sherwin but no degree was associated with the interdisciplinary curricula and approval was delayed. Eight professors worked on the coordinating committee with Parpart, who was selected to lead the program from Fall 1988. Parpart became a full professor in 1993 and the following year became coordinator of international development studies. She became the Lester B. Pearson Chair of international development studies in 2003 and retained that chair until 2005, when she became a professor emeritus at Dalhousie.

Parpart served as a visiting professor and the graduate coordinator in the Institute for Gender and Development Studies at the University of the West Indies, Saint Augustine, Trinidad and Tobago from 2007 to 2011. She also worked as a research fellow for the Gender Institute of the London School of Economics until 2015. Parpart and her husband, political scientist Timothy M. Shaw became adjunct research fellows of the Department of Conflict Resolution, Human Security and Global Governance at the University of Massachusetts Boston in 2012. In 2019, the couple established a graduate scholarship in international development studies and political sciences at Dalhousie. She is on the editorial board of the journal African Security.

== Research ==
Parpart's work has focused on the intersections of gender, agency, and development with a focus on the Global South and particularly Africa. She has examined correlations between colonial power structures drawing parallels with traditional rural power hierarchies by elder men. Political scientist Meredeth Turshen said that Parpart concluded that controlling women's sexual behavior and freedoms facilitated the functioning of indirect rule. Controlling women's choices in whom to marry, preventing wives' adultery, keeping women in rural areas and preventing them from free movement all contributed to the system that centralized power in men kept male authority intact. Parpart and other scholars pointed out that women rarely appeared in colonial records unless it was to address a moral panic such as prostitution or polygyny, or as code for problems related to rights or generational relationships. Looking at other power structures, Parpart argued, as had other feminist authors such as Maria Mies, that the capitalist system relied on exploiting women's domestic labor as free, thereby minimizing its value.

Unaludo Sechele, stated that Parpart's work confirmed that post-independence, despite constitutional guarantees for equal access to education and socio-politico-economic structures, many African women found limitations to their educational experiences and job opportunities. While women were increasingly accepted into universities, the courses that accepted them were typically in the humanities, and the jobs they were able to secure paid less and had more limits to advancement than those available to men. She proposed that policies of gender equity did not require that men and women (or boys and girls) be treated in the exact same manner, but instead that their differing needs, aspirations, and behaviors be equally valued and given support and access to take advantage of opportunities and participate in decision-making. Scholars Ann-Dorte Christensen and Sune Qvotrup Jensen stated that Parpart examined the ramifications of being excluded from decision-making and having limited paths for economic security and concluded that poverty and lack of opportunities have led young men to participate in terrorist actions. She argued that societal expectations for masculinity made young men prime targets for recruitment to military and paramilitary groups because theses types of organizations provided men with the means to make a living and appear strong.

Another focus of Parpart's work has been on urbanization and specifically problems that accompany modernization and development. Much of her analysis has evaluated how gender impacts and is impacted by development policies in Africa and Asia. According to sociologist Kriemild Saunders, Parpart has criticized the participatory rural appraisal model of development because, although it incorporates local knowledge in evaluating solutions and developing policy, it does not take into account power imbalances which may lead to continued marginalization of women. Along with others, Parpart had identified that there are often entrenched biases against marginalized groups which prevent or inhibit their empowerment. Instead, she advocates for a more balanced approach in designing developmental models that are informed by both tradition and modern changes. To shift shift development toward equality for both men and women, Parpart and other scholars who advocate for a balanced approach, argue that the complex relationships between poverty, race, ethnicity, class, and gender must be evaluated in terms of power relationships.

== Selected works ==
- Parpart, Barbara Jane Little. Labor and Capital on the Copperbelt: African Labor Strategy and Corporate Labor Strategy in the Northern Rhodesian Copper Mines, 1924–1964 (PhD). Boston, Massachusetts: Boston University. OCLC 8523580.
- Parpart, Jane L.; Staudt, Kathleen A., eds. (1989). Women and the State in Africa. Boulder, Colorado: Lynne Rienner Publishers. doi:10.1515/9781685853037. ISBN 978-1-68585-303-7.
- Parpart, Jane L. (July 1993). "Who is the 'Other'?: A Postmodern Feminist Critique of Women and Development Theory and Practice". Development and Change. 24 (3). Hoboken, New Jersey: Wiley-Blackwell: 439–464. doi:10.1111/j.1467-7660.1993.tb00492.x. ISSN 0012-155X. OCLC 5156186035.
- Parpart, Jane L.; Connelly, M. Patricia; Barriteau, V. Eudine, eds. (2000). Theoretical Perspectives on Gender and Development. Ottawa, Ontario: International Development Research Centre. ISBN 978-0-88936-910-8.
- Parpart, Jane L.; Rai, Shirin M.; Staudt, Kathleen, eds. (2002). Rethinking Empowerment: Gender and Development in a Global/Local World. Warwick Studies in Globalisation. London, UK: Routledge. ISBN 978-0-415-27769-3.
- Marchand, Marianne H.; Parpart, Jane L., eds. (2003). Feminism/ Postmodernism/ Development (PDF) (Ebook ed.). London, UK: Routledge. ISBN 978-0-203-42609-8.
- Parpart, Jane L.; Zalewski, Marysia, eds. (2008). Rethinking the Man Question: Sex, Gender and Violence in International Relations. London, UK: Zed Books. ISBN 978-1-84277-979-8.
- Parpart, Jane L. (April 2014). "Exploring the Transformative Potential of Gender Mainstreaming in International Development Institutions". Journal of International Development. 26 (3). New York, New York: John Wiley & Sons: 382–395. doi:10.1002/jid.2948. ISSN 0954-1748. OCLC 5566337085.
- Parpart, Jane; McFee, Deborah (December 2017). "Rethinking Gender Mainstreaming in Development Policy and Practice" (PDF). Caribbean Review of Gender Studies (11). Saint Augustine, Trinidad: University of the West Indies: 242–252. ISSN 1995-1108.
- Parpart, Jane L. (July 2020). "Rethinking Silence, Gender and Power in Insecure Sites: Implications for Feminist Security Studies in a Postcolonial World". Review of International Studies. 46 (3). Cambridge, Cambridgeshire: Cambridge University Press: 315–324. doi:10.1017/S026021051900041X. ISSN 0260-2105. OCLC 8611553115.
