= Than Than Swe =

13th Governor of Central Bank of Myanmar

- သန်းသန်းဆွေ

13th Governor of the Central Bank of Myanmar
- In office 19 August 2022 – 10 April 2026
- Appointed by: State Administration Council
- Deputy: Zaw Myint Aung; Dr Lin Aung
- Preceded by: Than Nyein
- Succeeded by: Khin Naing Oo

Deputy Governor of the Central Bank of Myanmar
- In office 4 February 2021 – 18 August 2023
- Appointed by: State Administration Council
- Prime Minister: Min Aung Hlaing
- Served with: Win Thaw, Deputy Governor

Personal details
- Born: 3 February 1967 (age 59)

Than Than Swe (Burmese: သန်းသန်းဆွေ) is a Burmese civil servant who was governor of Central Bank of Myanmar between 2022 and 2026. She became the first female to hold the position of governor in the country's history.

== Career ==
She was appointed as one of two vice-governors of the Central Bank on 4 February 2021, three days after the military seized power by overthrowing the country's democratically elected government. She was also appointed as the leader of a board to supervise dollars and gold. Than Than Swe was the target of a failed assassination attempt by anti-regime resistance fighters during a public outrage over a new Central Bank decree ordering the sale of all U.S. dollars and other foreign currencies at a fixed rate to licensed banks. She became the highest-ranking official of the regime to be attacked. On 19 August 2022, the State Administration Council appointed Than Than Swe as governor of the Central Bank of Myanmar, replacing Than Nyein. She was replaced as Governor in April 2026.
