= Satyabrata Rai Chowdhuri =

Indian political scientist (1935–2016)

- Satyabrata Rai Chowdhuri
- Born: 27 August 1935; Bengal Presidency, British India
- Died: 2016
- Awards: Fellow of the Royal Asiatic Society
- Scientific career
- Fields: Political Science, International Relations, South Asian Studies
- Workplaces: Institute of Commonwealth Studies; University of London

Satyabrata Rai Chowdhuri, FRAS (27 August 1935 – 2016) was an Indian political scientist, political historian and international relations expert.

== Life and career ==
Chowdhuri was a senior research fellow in international relations at the Institute of Commonwealth Studies, University of London, United Kingdom, and an Emeritus Professor of Political Science at India's University Grants Commission. Earlier he taught at the universities of Calcutta, Rabindra Bharati, London and Oxford.

Chowdhuri was a prolific writer with primary interests in nuclear issues and South Asian Politics. He was a columnist at Project Syndicate, and Asia Times Online, besides many news dailies across the globe. He was also known for his books Nuclear Politics and Leftism in India among others.

Chowdhuri scholarship in South Asian Studies was honoured in 2006 with the Fellowship of the Royal Asiatic Society, the UK's highest society in Asian studies.

Chowdhuri died in 2016.
