= Leah Vosko =

Canadian political scientist

Academic background
- Education: B.A., Political science, Trent University; M.A., Women's Studies, Simon Fraser University; PhD., York University
- Thesis: No jobs, lots of work: the gendered rise of the temporary employment relationship in Canada, 1897-1997 (1999)

Academic work
- Discipline: Political science
- Institutions: York University
- Main interests: Political Economy, Labour Rights, Gender Studies, Migration, Citizenship

Leah F. Vosko FRSC (born 1971) is a professor of political science and Canada Research Chair at York University. Her research interests are focused on political economy, labour rights, gender studies, migration, and citizenship. In 2015, she was elected a Fellow of the Royal Society of Canada.

== Education ==
Vosko earned her Bachelor of Arts in political science from Trent University before attending Simon Fraser University. She published her thesis under the title "Shrink, cut...dye? : NAFTA and women's work in the Canadian clothing industry" in 1994 and earned her Master of Arts in gender studies. From there, Vosko earned her PhD at York University. Her dissertation from York University was titled "No jobs, lots of work: the gendered rise of the temporary employment relationship in Canada, 1897-1997."

== Career ==
In 2000, following her PhD from York University, Vosko published "Temporary Work: The Gendered Rise of a Precarious Employment Relationship" through the University of Toronto Press. Three years later, while working at York University in the Faculty of Liberal and Professional Studies, she co-edited "Changing Canada: Political Economy as Transformation" through the McGill-Queen's University Press. As a Canada Research Chair in Feminist Political Economy, Vosko conducted research through the Community University Research Alliance on Contingent Employment and the Social Sciences and Humanities Research Council with Cynthia Cranford and Nancy Zukewich. Her research results showed that the Canadian labour market was becoming unstable due to "the growth of temporary and part-time wage work, self-employment and other forms of work not fully protected by labour laws and policies." In March 2004, her research on precarious employment regarding foreign labour was featured on CBC Radio.

In 2005, Vosko received funding from the Ontario government under the Early Researcher Award. Vosko's funding went towards her research project regarding precarious employment in first world countries such as the United States and Australia. That year she published "Self-Employed Workers Organize: Law, Policy, and Unions" through the McGill-Queen's University Press with Cynthia Cranford, Judy Fudge, and Eric Tucker. The book created a multi-disciplinary discourse around how legal, political, and social positions affected labour rights. The following year she edited "Precarious Employment: Understanding Labour Market Insecurity in Canada," an interdisciplinary book with academic contributors from across Canada that focused on precarious employment and how laws, policies, and labour market institutions affected it.

In 2009, Vosko, Martha MacDonald, and Iain Campbell published "Gender and the Contours of Precarious Employment," which focused on precarious employment in Canada, Germany, the United States, Australia and in the European Union. In the book, the authors argue that precarious employment was the result of social, economic, and political inequality at the national and regional level. This was followed by "Managing the Margins: Gender, Citizenship and the International Regulation of Precarious Employment" which focused on capitalistic labour markets and the rise in precarious employment such as part‐time, temporary paid employment, and self‐employment. Four years later, Vosko collaborated with Valerie Preston and Robert Latham to create "Liberating Temporariness: Imagining Alternatives to Permanence as a Pathway to Social Inclusion." The book focused on the ways in which temporariness, such as unstable work, was being institutionalized as a condition of life.

In 2015, she was elected a Fellow of the Royal Society of Canada's Division of Social Sciences for her work on the political economy of work, gender, citizenship, migration and labour markets. That year she also helped lead a panel discussion at York's Global Labour Research Centre about the Canadian political economy. Vosko focused her research on employment standards and labour rights, specifically regarding migrant workers. As a result, she became the Principal Investigator of an employment standards research partnership titled “Closing the Enforcement Gap: Improving Employment Standards Protections for People in Precarious Jobs” with the Ontario Ministry of Labour. Simultaneously, she worked as the director of the Employment Standards Database which would work in conjuncture with this partnership to provide researchers with research on employment standards across national contexts. As a result, she was the recipient of York's inaugural Charles Taylor Prize for Excellence in Policy Research by Broadbent Institute in 2016.

The following year, Vosko received $131,793 from the Canadian Foundation for Innovation for her research project "Canada Labour Code Data Analysis Infrastructure." Her project's goal was to create a research tool that would allow for researchers to sift through the large databases the Government of Canada's Labour Program collected efficiently. In July 2016, the Government of Ontario published a study titled "The Changing Workplaces Review" which Vosko helped prepare. Due to her research in precarious work, Vosko had been approached by two government advisors to help create their study on the Ontario Employment Standards Act. She was also renewed as a Tier 1 Canada Research Chair in the Political Economy of Gender and Work and recognized by York University as a research leader in the Faculty of Liberal Arts & Professional Studies.

In 2018, her research and recommendations from “Closing the Enforcement Gap: Improving Employment Standards Protections for People in Precarious Jobs” with the Ontario Ministry of Labour was used to shape the Canadian Labour Code Bill C-86. That year, Vosko was renewed again as a Tier 1 Canada Research Chair in the Department of Political Science. In 2019, Vosko began collaborating with Mark P. Thomas, Carlo Fanelli, and Olena Lyubchenko to analyze the social change of the Canadian political-economic regarding work and social inequality. On September 10, 2019, Vosko became the first York faculty member to be the recipient of the Social Sciences and Humanities Research Council of Canada Impact Award.

== Publications ==
The following is a list of publications:

- Change and Continuity: Rethinking the New Canadian Political Economy (2019)
- Disrupting Deportability: Transnational Workers Organize (2019)
- Liberating Temporariness?: Migration, Work and Citizenship in an Age of Insecurity (2014)
- Managing the Margins: Gender, Citizenship and the International Regulation of Precarious Employment (2010)
- Gender and the Contours of Precarious Employment (2009)
- Precarious Employment: Understanding Labour Market Insecurity in Canada (2006)
- Self-Employed Workers Organize: Law, Policy, and Unions (2005)
- Challenging the Market: The Struggle to Regulate Work and Income (2004)
- Changing Canada: The Political Economy of Transformation (2003)
- Studies in Political Economy: Developments in Feminism (2003)
- Temporary Work: The Gendered Rise of a Precarious Employment Relationship (2000)
