= MyanmarPay =

Myanmar digital payment switch system

- Product type: Instant real-time inter-bank and inter-mobile payment system
- Current owner: Central Bank of Myanmar
- Produced by: Central Bank of Myanmar
- Country: Myanmar
- Introduced: 27 February 2025; 20 months ago
- Markets: Myanmar
- Website: myanmarpay.com.mm

MMQR (Myanmar Quick Response) is a national QR code payment standard developed by the Central Bank of Myanmar (CBM). It was introduced to support digital payments in Myanmar by allowing different banks and mobile financial service providers to operate through a common QR payment system. MMQR uses the EMVCo standard and enables users to make payments by scanning a single QR code accepted across participating platforms.

== History ==
Myanmar previously had multiple QR payment systems operated by separate banks and digital wallet providers. Because these systems followed different standards, payments between platforms were not always compatible.

The Central Bank of Myanmar launched MMQR on 4 March 2025 as a national QR payment standard. The system was introduced to connect participating banks, mobile wallets, and payment platforms through a common QR framework and to encourage wider adoption of digital payments.

In January 2019, the Central Bank of Myanmar released the MMQR Specification Version 1.0 for QR-based payments. The Central Bank later selected Payplus as the digital payment switch operator for MyanmarPay in 2021, with implementation of the system starting in 2022. MMQR was officially introduced in February 2025 as Myanmar's national QR payment standard.

== See also ==
- ASEAN Integrated QR Code Payment System
- Central Bank of Myanmar
