= Institute of Commonwealth Studies =

British postgraduate academic institution

- Established: 1949; 77 years ago
- Parent institution: School of Advanced Study, University of London
- Director: Kingsley Abbott
- Location: London, England, United Kingdom
- Campus: Urban
- Website: commonwealth.sas.ac.uk

The Institute of Commonwealth Studies is the sole postgraduate academic institution in the United Kingdom devoted to the study of the Commonwealth.

== History ==
The Institute of Commonwealth Studies was founded in 1949.

The predecessor to the Menzies Australia Institute, the Australian Studies Centre, was founded in 1982 in the Institute of Commonwealth Studies, headed by Australian historian Geoffrey Bolton. In 1999 the centre was moved to King's College London and renamed Sir Robert Menzies Centre for Australian Studies.

== Description and functions ==
The institute is a national and international centre of excellence for policy-relevant research, research facilitation and teaching. As a member of the University of London's School of Advanced Study, the institute aims to address the challenges confronting the modern Commonwealth through the development of effective, evidence-based policy solutions with a focus on human rights, the rule of law, media freedom and climate change.

It is also home to the longest-running interdisciplinary and practice-oriented human rights MA programme in the UK.

The institute's library is an international resource holding more than 190,000 volumes, with particularly impressive Caribbean, Southern African and Australian holdings and over 200 archival collections.

== Notable academics ==
- Satyabrata Rai Chowdhuri, senior research fellow in international relations
- Krishnan Srinivasan, fellow from 2002 to 2008
- Susan Williams, senior research fellow
- Marika Sherwood, senior research fellow

=== List of directors ===
Following the resignation of Pat Caplan in 2000, Anthony Kenny, former Warden of Rhodes House conducted a review, the Kenny Report. This suggested that the institute should put more weight behind contemporary politics and international relations, which was reflected in the appointment of Tim Shaw as director after a delay of a year.

- 1949–1957: Keith Hancock
- 1957–1965: Kenneth Robinson
- 1966-1983: WH Morris-Jones
- 1983-1993: Shula Marks
- 1998–2000: Pat Caplan
- 2000 – 30 May 2001: Terence Daintith (acting)
- 1 June 2001 – 31 July 2001 Robert Holland (acting)
- 1 August 2001 – 2006 Timothy M. Shaw
- 2006-2009 Richard Crook
- 2009–2022: Philip Murphy
- 2022–2023: Sue Onslow
- 2023–present: Kingsley Abbott

== Notable alumni ==
- Richard Fell
