= Susan Williams (historian) =

British historian and author

- Occupations: Historian and author
- Employer(s): Institute of Commonwealth Studies, University of London
- Awards: Windham Campbell Prize 2023

Susan Williams is a historian and author based in London. She is best known for her more recent works on how Britain, the United States, and the rest of the Western World influenced or interfered in modern 20th-century autonomy in African countries.

== Career ==
Williams is a senior research fellow at the Institute of Commonwealth Studies, University of London.

Her publications include The People's King: The True Story of the Abdication, a book about the abdication of Edward VIII, published in 2003; and Colour Bar: The Triumph of Seretse Khama and His Nation, published in 2006, on which the 2016 film A United Kingdom is based. The film was directed by Amma Asante, and stars David Oyelowo as Seretse Khama and Rosamund Pike as Ruth Khama.

Her book Who Killed Hammarskjold? (2011), about the 1961 death of the then-Secretary-General of the United Nations, Dag Hammarskjöld, triggered a new UN investigation in 2015.

In Spies in the Congo: America's Atomic Mission in World War II she tells an intricate tale regarding the formation of special unit of the US Office of Strategic Services (OSS), a forerunner of the CIA, to purchase and secretly extract all the uranium from Shinkolobwe in Katanga Province, Belgian Congo. The purpose of this was to obtain the radioactive material and keep it out of the hands of the Axis powers. The uranium was used in the bombing of Hiroshima and Nagasaki.

Her latest book is White Malice: The CIA and the Covert Recolonization of Africa, published in 2021.

== Awards ==
She was the recipient of a 2023 Windham–Campbell Literature Prize for non-fiction.

The Windham Campbell judges noted that: 'Susan Williams chronicles imperial legacies with a forensic eye, a historical mind, and a decolonial sensibility for African agency; her findings are as stunning as they are transformative.'

== Books ==
- —— (2000). Ladies of Influence: Women of the Elite in Interwar Britain. London: Allen Lane. ISBN 9780713992618.
- —— (2003). The People's King: The True Story of the Abdication. London: Allen Lane. ISBN 9780713995732.^{α}
- —— (2006). Colour Bar: The Triumph of Seretse Khama and His Nation. London: Allen Lane. ISBN 9780713998115.^{β}
- —— (2011). Who Killed Hammarskjöld? The UN, the Cold War, and White Supremacy in Africa. London: Hurst. ISBN 9781849041584.
- —— (2016). Spies in the Congo: America's Atomic Mission in World War II. PublicAffairs. ISBN 9781610396547.
- —— (2021). White Malice: The CIA and the Covert Recolonization of Africa. PublicAffairs. ISBN 9781541768291.

=== Notes ===
^αon the abdication of Edward VIII
^βon the founding president of Botswana
