= Charles Otto Blagden =

English Orientalist and linguist

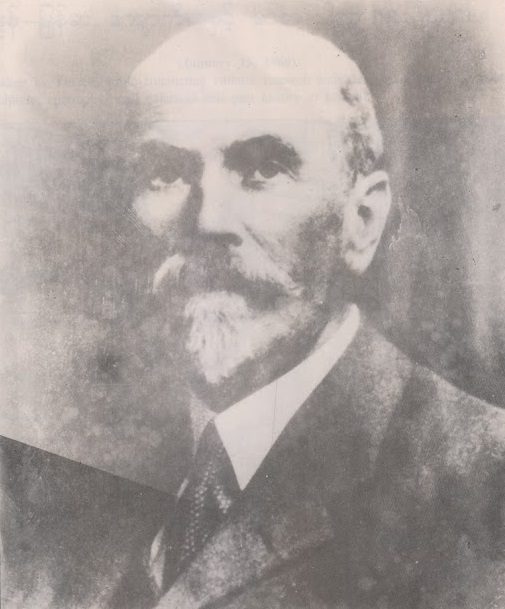
- Born: 6 September 1864
- Died: 25 August 1949 (aged 84)
- Citizenship: United Kingdom
- Education: Corpus Christi College, Oxford
- Known for: Study of Mon and Pyu inscriptions
- Scientific career
- Fields: Linguistics

Charles Otto Blagden (6 September 1864 – 25 August 1949) was an English Orientalist and linguist who specialised in the Malay, Mon and Pyu languages. He is particularly known for his studies of Burmese epigraphic inscriptions in the Mon and Pyu scripts.

== Biography ==
Blagden was educated at Dulwich College in London, after which he obtained a scholarship to Corpus Christi College, Oxford University where he read Classics, graduating with a first class degree.

In 1888 Blagden was appointed to the Straits Settlements civil service in Malaya, where he held a number of administrative and judicial posts in Malacca and Singapore In 1897 he returned to England due to ill health, and the following year he became a Holt Scholar of Gray's Inn in London. In 1897 he was called to the bar, and for the next seventeen years he practiced law, co-authoring a number of legal works, whilst continuing to publish academic articles on Malay, Mon and Pyu.

In 1916 the School of Oriental Studies (later School of Oriental and African Studies) was founded as a constituent college of the University of London, in order to promote the teaching of Asian languages and to train colonial officials for the British Empire, admitting its first students in January 1917. Blagden had been acting as an examiner in Malay for the University of London since 1910, and in 1917 he was appointed as Lecturer in Malay at the School of Oriental Studies. He was later promoted to Reader and then Dean, before retiring in 1935.

Blagden also cooperated with Evangeline Edwards on studies of Chinese vocabularies of Malacca Malay (1931) and Cham (1939).

Blagden acted as vice-president of the Royal Asiatic Society of Great Britain and Ireland during 1923–1933 and 1935–1938, and then honorary vice-president from 1938 until his death in 1949. He was also vice-president of the Royal Anthropological Society.

In the 1950s Gordon Luce revealed plans to "complete and publish Blagden’s long-planned grammar and etymological dictionary of Old Mon", plans which, despite Luce's "tremendous effort", were not to be realised.

== Works ==
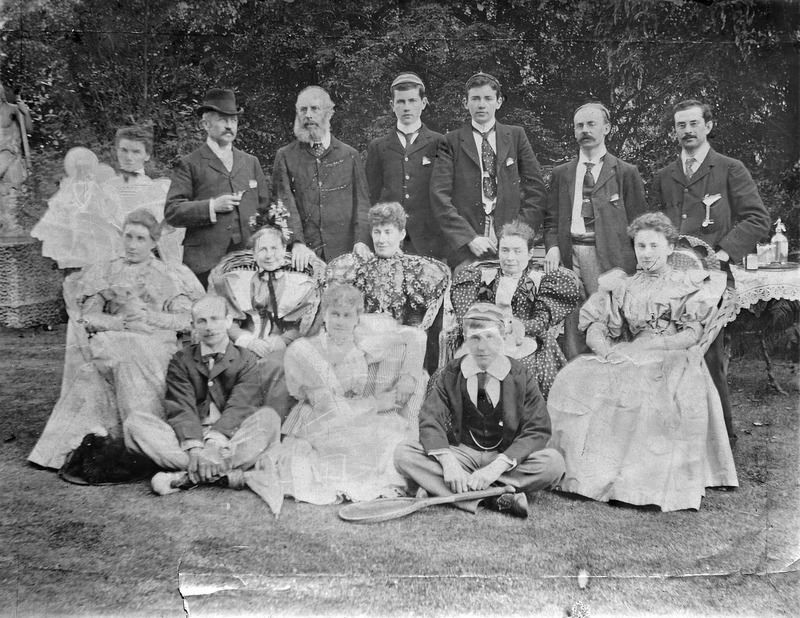
Photograph by Charles Otto Blagden of his family

- 1898. "The medieval chronology of Malacca".
- 1902. "A Malayan element in some of the languages of Southern Indo-China". In Journal of the Straits Branch, Royal Asian Society no. 38.
- 1906. With Walter William Skeat. Pagan races of the Malay Peninsula. London, Macmillan and Co.
- 1906. "Siam and the Malay Peninsula". In Journal of the Royal Asiatic Society.
- 1909. "Notes on Malay history". In Journal of the Royal Asiatic Society.
- 1910. "Quelques notions sur la phonétique du Talain et son évolution historique". In Journal asiatique.
- 1912. "Notes on Talaing epigraphy".
- 1914. "The Pyu inscriptions". In Epigraphica Indica vol. 12 no. 16: 127–137.
- 1917. With Richard Winstedt. A Malay Reader. Oxford : Clarendon Press.
- 1920. Môn Inscriptions. Rangoon: Government Printery and Stationery.
- 1928. "The inscriptions of the Kalyāṇīsīmā, Pegu". In Epigraphia Birmanica.
- 1960. English-Malay phrase-book. Singapore; Malays Publishing House.

Further works listed by sealang.net here
