= Pat Caplan =

British anthropologist and academic

Pat Caplan FRAI
- Born: Ann Patricia Bailey; 13 March 1942 (age 84)
- Title: Professor of Social Anthropology
- Spouse: Lionel Caplan (m. 1967)

Academic background
- Education: SOAS University of London; University of London

Academic work
- Discipline: Social anthropology
- Sub-discipline: Gender; Sexuality; Women; Food and health; Africa; India
- Institutions: Birkbeck, University of London; SOAS University of London; Open University; Goldsmiths, University of London; Institute of Commonwealth Studies, London

Ann Patricia Bailey "Pat" Caplan, FRAI (born 13 March 1942) is a retired British anthropologist and academic. From 1989 to 2003, she was Professor of Social Anthropology at Goldsmiths College, University of London. She was also the Director of the Institute of Commonwealth Studies between 1998 and 2000.

== Early life and education ==
Caplan was born on 13 March 1942 to Sylvester Launcelot Bailey and Marjorie Bailey (née Parr). From 1960 to 1963, she studied for a Bachelor of Arts (BA) degree in African Studies (Swahili) at the SOAS University of London, University of London. She then undertook postgraduate studies in social anthropology at the University of London, and completed a Master of Arts (MA) degree in 1965. In 1968 she gained a Doctor of Philosophy (PhD) degree with a thesis titled Non-unilineal kinship on Mafia Island, Tanzania.

== Academic career ==
Caplan worked as a tutor at Birkbeck College, University of London, for the 1964/1965 and 1968/1969 academic years, and as a tutor at the Open University in the 1970/1971 and 1974/1975 academic years. She was a postdoctoral fellow at the School of Oriental and African Studies, University of London from 1968 to 1970 and from 1974 to 1976.

In 1977, Caplan joined Goldsmiths College, University of London, as a lecturer in anthropology; she was later promoted to senior lecturer. Goldsmiths did not have an Anthropology Department until the 1980s. In 1989, she was appointed Professor of Social Anthropology. From 1998 to 2000, she was also Director of the Institute of Commonwealth Studies of the School of Advanced Study, University of London.

Caplan retired in 2003 and was appointed Emeritus Professor.

== Personal life ==
In 1967, the then Pat Bailey married Lionel Caplan. Together they have two children: one son and one daughter.

== Honours ==
In 1995, Caplan was elected a Fellow of the Royal Anthropological Institute (FRAI).

== Selected works ==
- Caplan, A. Patricia (1972). Priests and Cobblers: a study of social change in a Hindu village in Western Nepal. London: Intertext Books. ISBN 978-0700201969.
- Caplan, Ann Patricia (1975). Choice and Constraint in a Swahili Community: Property, Hierarchy and Cognatic Descent on the East African Coast. London: Oxford University Press. ISBN 978-0197241950.
- Caplan, Patricia; Bujra, Janet M., eds. (1978). Women United, Women Divided: cross cultural perspectives on female solidarity. London: Tavistock Publications. ISBN 978-0422764803.
- Caplan, Patricia (1985). Class and Gender in India: Women and their Organisations in a South Indian City. London: Tavistock Publications. ISBN 978-0422799706.
- Caplan, Pat, ed. (1989). The Cultural Construction of Sexuality. London: Routledege. ISBN 978-0415040136.
- Le Guennec-Coppens, Françoise; Caplan, Pat, eds. (1991). Les Swahili entre Afrique et Arabie (in French). Paris: Karthala. ISBN 978-2865373253.
- Bell, Diane; Caplan, Pat; Karim, Wazir Jahan, eds. (1992). Gendered Fields: Women, Men and Ethnography. London: Routledge. ISBN 978-0415062527.
- Caplan, Pat, ed. (1995). Understanding Disputes: The Politics of Argument. Oxford: Bloomsbury. ISBN 978-0854969241.
- Caplan, Pat (1997). African Voices, African Lives: Personal Narratives from a Swahili Village. London: Routledge. ISBN 978-0415137232.
- Caplan, Pat, ed. (1997). Food, Health and Identity: approaches from the social sciences. London: Routledge. ISBN 978-0415156790.
- Caplan, Pat, ed. (2000). Risk Revisited. London: Pluto Press. ISBN 978-0745314631.
- Caplan, Pat, ed. (2003). The Ethics of Anthropology: Debates and Dilemmas. New York: Routledge. ISBN 978-0415296427.
- Caplan, Pat; Topan, Farouk, eds. (2004). Swahili Modernities: Culture, Politics, and Identity on the East Coast of Africa. Trenton, N.J.: Africa World Press. ISBN 978-1592210466.

The papers of Pat and Lionel Caplan, comprising field notes as well as material relating to the subsequent publication of books and articles based on fieldwork are held by SOAS Archives
