= Timothy M. Shaw =

Canadian political scientist

Timothy M. Shaw (born January 1945) is an England-born Canadian political scientist whose research interests include International Political Economy, Global South, development studies and regionalism in Africa and the Caribbean. He is Associate Research Fellow at United Nations University, and Adjunct Research Professor at Carleton University, University of Ottawa and University of Massachusetts Boston. On 1 August, Shaw was appointed Director of the Institute of Commonwealth Studies at the University of London where he remains Professor Emeritus.

He is editorial board member of academic journals such as African Review, African Security, African Security Review, Canadian Journal of Development Studies, Globalizations, Governance in Africa, International Relations of the Asia-Pacific, Journal of Global Ethics, Journal of Intervention & Statebuilding, and The Round Table, Third World Quarterly. He also is editor of Routledge Book Series on International Relations in East Asia and Palgrave Macmillan’s International Political Economy Series.

After completing his MA at the University of East Africa (1969) (whilst it was still an independent external college of the University of London) and PhD at the Princeton University (USA) (1975), Shaw taught at the Dalhousie University for three decades (1971–2000), and directed the Pearson Institute, the International Development Studies department, and the Centre for Foreign Policy Studies. In 2014, he received an honorary PhD from the University of St Andrews in Scotland.
