= Jacqui True =

Australian political scientist

Jacqui True FASSA
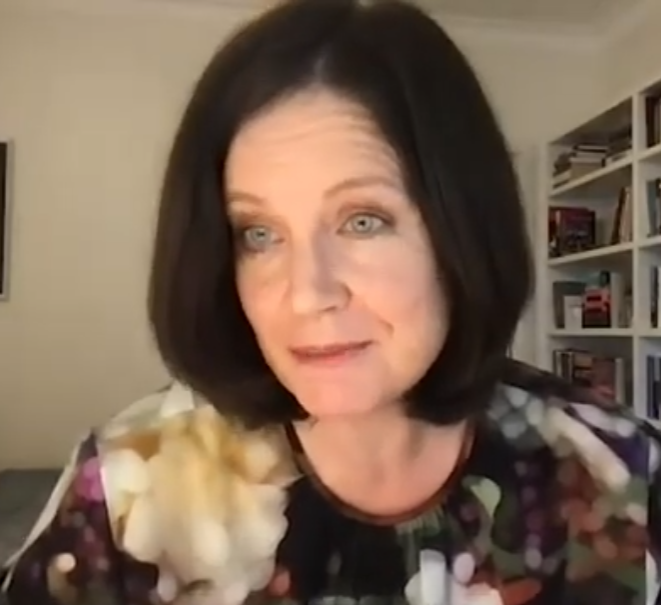
- In an online discussion in 2021
- Education: University of Arizona; York University
- Scientific career
- Fields: Political science; Gender studies
- Workplaces: University of Southern California; Michigan State University; University of Auckland; Australian National University; University of Gothenburg; Monash University

Jacqui True FASSA is a political scientist and expert in gender studies. She is a professor of international relations at Monash University, where she is also Director of the Centre for Gender, Peace and Security. She studies international relations, gender mainstreaming, violence against women and its connections to political economy, and the methodology of feminist social science.

== Career ==
True received an MA from the University of Arizona, followed by a PhD from York University. She then was a post-doctoral fellow at the University of Southern California, before joining the faculty at Michigan State University. She later moved to the University of Auckland, and then Monash University. She has also had visiting positions at the Australian National University and University of Gothenburg.

In addition to more than 100 articles in peer-reviewed academic journals, True has been an author or editor of more than a dozen books. She has been the sole author of multiple books, including Gender, globalization, and postsocialism: The Czech Republic after communism (2003).

In her 2012 book, The political economy of violence against women, True addresses the apparent paradox that significant recent legislation around the world with the stated purpose of decreasing violence against women had not managed to substantially reduce the problem. She does so by studying what causes violence against women to occur in the first place, from the origins of domestic violence to war crimes targeting women. She develops an approach based on political economy. True argues that violence against women arises inextricably from inequality, poverty, and the gendered division of household labour, as well as broader phenomena like militarism. This provides an explanation for violence against women in terms of social and economic processes at the local, regional, and global levels, from violence at the home to the tendency for international financial crises to disproportionately affect the well-being of women. The book takes a feminist economic approach to the study of human rights using existing data, case studies, and new analyses. The political economy of violence against women won the Best Book Award from the Human Rights Section of the American Political Science Association in 2013, the 2013 International Political Economy Book Prize from the British International Studies Association, and the Australian Political Science Association's Carole Pateman book prize for gender and politics. It also received the annual book prize from the International Political Economy working group of the British International Studies Association.

True is a Fellow of the Academy of the Social Sciences in Australia. In 2018, True was awarded an honorary doctorate by Lund University.

True's work has been cited, or she has been quoted, in media outlets like The New York Times, Ms., and The Christian Science Monitor.

== Selected works ==
- "Transnational networks and policy diffusion: The case of gender mainstreaming", International studies quarterly, with Michael Mintrom (2001)
- Gender, globalization, and postsocialism: The Czech Republic after communism (2003)
- Feminist methodologies for international relations, with Brooke A. Ackerly and Maria Stern (2006)
- Doing feminist research in political and social science, with Brooke A. Ackerly (2010)
- The political economy of violence against women (2012)

== Selected awards ==
- Fellow, Academy of the Social Sciences in Australia
- Honorary doctorate, Lund University (2018)
- Eminent Scholar Award in Feminist Theory and Gender Studies, International Studies Association (2020)
