= QR Ph =

Cashless payment standard

QR Ph logo

QR Ph (officially the National QR Code Standard) is the standardized quick-response code system adopted in the Philippines, which is based on the Europay-Mastercard-VISA (EMV) standard. It serves as a swift and secure payment method for customers of both participating banks and non-bank electronic money issuers (EMI) in the country. Through QR Ph, users can conduct various transactions, including payments, fund transfers, and receipts from bank and e-money accounts within the Philippines. The implementation of QR Ph has been officially endorsed by Philippine Payments Management, Inc., following guidelines set forth in Circular 1055 by the Bangko Sentral ng Pilipinas (BSP).

The move towards digital payments aligns with the central bank's objective of promoting financial inclusion, particularly for small businesses and consumers, by providing them with convenient options for day-to-day transactions. BSP's then-governor Benjamin Diokno emphasized that this transition supports the goal of making the Philippine society more "cash-light" instead of its current "cash-heavy" state. During the pandemic, the government promoted cashless payments to cut down physical interaction.

The standard currently focuses on person-to-person and person-to-merchant payments. The standard is expected to enhance customer and merchant experiences, promoting heavier utilization of digital payments.

== See also ==
- QRIS — similar system used in Indonesia
