= Andrew Turton =

British anthropologist (1938–2021)

- Turton dancing with a Thai woman in 1976
- Born: 1938; Bristol, England
- Died: 13 August 2021 (aged 82–83)

Academic background
- Thesis: Northern Thai Peasant Society: A Case Study of Jural and Political Structures at the Village Level and Their Twentieth Century Transformations (1975)

Academic work
- Discipline: Anthropologist
- Institutions: SOAS

Andrew Turton (1938 – 13 August 2021) was a British anthropologist who specialised on Thailand and the Tai peoples of Southeast Asia.

== Life ==
Turton held the Chair of Anthropology and Chair of the Centre of Southeast Asian Studies at the School of Oriental and African Studies (SOAS), University of London. He lived for many years in Thailand, where he did research, mainly in Northern Thailand, but also in Laos and the Chinese province of Yunnan, where the native areas of several Tai peoples lie. He lived in London until his death in 2021.

== Notable works ==
- "Matrilineal Descent Groups and Spirit Cults of the Thai-Yuan in Northern Thailand" (PDF). Journal of the Siam Society. 60 (2): 217–256. 1972.
- Thailand: Roots of Conflict (co-edited with Jonathan Fast and Malcolm Caldwell). Nottingham: Spokesman. 1978.
  - "The Current Situation in the Thai Countryside": 104–142. (Also published in the Journal of Contemporary Asia. 8 (1): 104–142. 1978. doi:10.1080/00472337885390061.)
- Thai Institutions of Slavery. Oxford: Blackwell. 1980. pp. 251–92.
- History and Peasant Consciousness in South East Asia (co-edited with Shigeharu Tanabe). Osaka: National Museum of Ethnology. 1984.
  - "Limits of Ideological Domination and the Formation of Social Consciousness": 19–74.
- Production, Power and Participation in Rural Thailand: Experiences of Poor Farmers' Groups. Geneva: United Nations Research Institute for Social Development. 1987.
- Southeast Asia (co-edited with John G. Taylor). Basingstoke and London: Macmillan. 1988.
- Agrarian Transformation: Local Processes and the State in Southeast Asia (co-edited with Gillian Hart and Benjamin White). Berkeley: University of California Press. 1989.
- Thai Construction of Knowledge (co-edited with Manas Chitakasem). London: School of Oriental and African Studies, University of London. 1991.
- Civility and Savagery: Social Identity in Tai States (editor). Richmond, Surrey: Curzon. 2000.
- The Gold and Silver Road of Trade and Friendship: The McLeod and Richardson Diplomatic Missions to Tai States in 1837 (co-edited with Volker Grabowsky). Chiang Mai: Silkworm Books. 2003.
