= Some Spirits Heal, Others Only Dance =

1999 book by Roy Willis

- Author: Roy Willis
- Language: English
- Subject: Cultural anthropology
- Publisher: Berg
- Publication date: 1999
- Media type: Print (Hardback and paperback)
- ISBN: 1-85973-288-7

Some Spirits Heal, Others Only Dance: A Journey into Human Selfhood in an African Village is an anthropological study of the ngulu cult among the Lungu people of Zambia authored by the anthropologist Roy Willis. It was first published in 1999 by Berg Publishers.

In the book, Willis discusses his own personal experiences with both the ngulu ceremonies of spiritual healing and the beliefs in malevolent muloozi sorcerers.

== Background ==
In 1993, Willis unsuccessfully applied to the Economic and Social Research Council (ESCR) to obtain funding for an anthropological expedition to study spirit possession in Zambian Ulungu. In 1995, he successfully submitted a re-formulated application influenced by the ideas of Anthony Cohen and Edith Turner, who argued that anthropologists should not dismiss people's belief in spirits from a western rationalist perspective. The following year, he returned to Ulungu, where he obtained three Lungu research assistants, and together they observed and filmed five ngulu rituals in Ulungu.

== Synopsis ==
Chapter one, "Research Assistance", provides a brief biography of Wallis' three Lungu assistants. In the second chapter, "Homeland and Familihood", Wallis offers a description of Ulungu and Lungu society, paying particular attention to extended family structures. Chapter three, "Managing Time and Space", explores conceptions of time and space among the Lungu, while in the following chapter, "Making Ethnography", Wallis outlines the ngulu ceremonies that he helped to organise and subsequently took part in; as part of this, he describes his own personal altered states of consciousness during the rituals. Chapter five, "Sorcery Attack", details Willis' own experience with alleged sorcerers (muloozi) and the rituals enacted to counteract them.

== Main arguments and observations ==
=== Ngulu ===
Willis described adepts of ngulu as a subcategory of Lungu "knowledge-bearing indigenous healers", with others being described as "herbalists", "spirit-aided doctors", and "female experts in sexuality and reproductive problems". He stated that many of these individuals could be described as "non-ordinary" people, with "a significant number" claiming to have attained their powers following a personal catastrophe. He also believed that one of the dominant features of all of these indigenous healers was their perceived ability to "'go beyond' social and even human boundaries in pursuit of healing knowledge and powers." He noted that dreaming played a major role in how Lungu healers obtained their esoteric knowledge, and felt that the distinctive feature of them was their "expanded self".

=== Muloozi and majini ===
Willis notes that in Lungu society, certain individuals have been accused of being a muloozi (sorcerer), individuals who work malevolent magic that can cause sickness and death using viwaanga (sorcery objects). Most of these muloozi were believed to be male, although he did meet one elderly woman serving as a nacimbuuza (traditional midwife) who claimed to have been a former sorcerer guilty of killing a number of people using miscarried foetuses as viwaanga. He noted that in the years before his arrival, an accused muloozi had been killed by an angry mob.

Willis also described his own personal experiences with muloozi and majini. One night in bed, in a semi-dreaming state, he saw a cylindrical white object moving toward him, something he felt was "unmistakenly hostile". Initially feeling paralysed, he then fully awoke and the object vanished. The following day he posed questions to a pendulum to ascertain the cause of this experience (a technique taught to him by a spiritual healer back in Britain); the answers he obtained led him to the conclusion that the hostile object had been sent by a sorcerer but that Wallis' own reaction had led to it being sent back to the original sender. His Lungu assistants believed that local sorcerers had wished to harm him because of his recent attempts to organise ngulu ceremonies and heal local people. The following night he again felt a hostile presence in his room, this time of a "thickset creature" about the size of a badger; he awoke shouting n"damn you" and it disappeared.

== Reception and recognition ==
Deborah Durham of Sweet Briar College in Virginia reviewed Willis' tome for the African Studies Review. She described it as a "charming little book", and praised it for being structured in a "readable manner", but nevertheless thought that it taught her little of the role of healing in Lungu society. She also remained unconvinced that Willis' self-expansive experience shed special light on Lungu indigenous healers. In the journal Anthropos, Wyatt MacGaffey remarked that Willis' account of his fieldwork was "attractive and unusually intimate", and that the narrative was "attractively readable" and ideal for introductory courses for students. He nevertheless criticised Willis' account of Lungu ritual conceptions of time and space as "conventional, literal, and naïve", and opined that his arguments for rejecting traditional Western rationalist interpretations of selfhood were "Postmodern, New Age and Old Hat."
