= Journal of African Cultural Studies =

- Discipline: African studies
- Language: English

Publication details
- Former name(s): African Languages and Cultures
- History: 1988-present
- Publisher: Routledge
- Frequency: Biannually

Standard abbreviations
- ISO 4: J. Afr. Cult. Stud.

Indexing
- ISSN: 1469-9346
- OCLC no.: 50709779

Links
- Journal homepage; Online access; Online archive

The Journal of African Cultural Studies is a biannual peer-reviewed academic journal covering research on African culture, including African literatures, both written and oral, performance arts, visual arts, music, the role of the media, the relationship between culture and power, culture and gender issues and sociolinguistic topics of cultural interest. It was established in 1988 as African Languages and Culture and obtained its current title in 1998.

== History ==
This journal continues African Language Studies. There was a 10-year hiatus between the publications.
