= Marysia Zalewski =

Marysia Zalewski is an academic associated with feminist approaches to international relations theory. They are a professor of international relations in the School of Law and Politics at Cardiff University. Previously, they were a professor and head of the School of Social Science (2011–2014) at the University of Aberdeen.

They graduated from the University of East Anglia with a degree in politics in 1988.

== Books ==
- International theory: positivism and beyond, co-edited with Steve Smith and Ken Booth, Cambridge University Press, 1996.
- The "man" question in international relations, co-edited with Jane Parpart, Westview Press, 1998.
- Feminism after postmodernism: Theorising through practice, Routledge, 2000.
- Rethinking the man question: Sex, gender and violence in international relations, co-edited with Jane L. Parpart, Zed Books, 2008.
- Feminist international relations: Exquisite corpse, Routledge, 2013.
