= Meredeth Turshen =

American political scientist

- Born: United States
- Occupations: Political scientist, academic, artist and an author

Academic background
- Education: B.A., Philosophy; M.A., Political Science; Ph.D., Comparative Politics
- Alma mater: Oberlin College; New York University; University of Sussex
- Thesis: The Political Economy of Health with a Case Study of Tanzania (1975)

Academic work
- Institutions: Rutgers University

Meredeth Turshen is an American political scientist, academic, artist and an author. She is a professor emerita at Rutgers University.

Turshen is most known for her works on the political ecology of disease and the political economy of health. Among her authored works are her publications in academic journals, including The Review of African Political Economy and Social Research as well as books such as What Women Do in Wartime: Gender and Conflict in Africa and Women's Health Movements: A Global Force for Change. She is the recipient of the 2007 Leadership in Diversity Award from Rutgers University. She is also known for her artwork, which integrates abstract and figurative compositions.

== Education ==
Turshen earned her B.A. in Philosophy from Oberlin College, followed by an M.A. in Political Science from New York University. She obtained her Ph.D. in Comparative Politics from the University of Sussex, UK.

== Career ==
Turshen began her career in 1960 when she joined the United Nations Children's Fund, serving as a research assistant. In 1965 she transferred to WHO, Geneva. Subsequently, she assumed the role of associate professor at Howard University from 1980 to 1982. She maintained a professorial role in public health and women's studies at Rutgers University from 1982 to 2018. Between 1983 and 2010, she held various positions at the Robert Wood Johnson Medical School. Since 2018, she is a professor emerita at Rutgers University.

== Research ==
Turshen's research covers international health, with a focus on African women's health and the repercussions of war on women. Her early research explored how malnutrition and disease in Tanzania's Songea District during the colonial era were shaped by economic, social, and political factors, emphasizing the negative health consequences of colonial economic policies, labor migration, and the neglect of domestic food production due to a dependent relationship with colonial powers. In the year 2000, she examined the economic and political violence against women during the civil war in Uganda, highlighting the prevalence of rape by soldiers, its social and economic consequences, and proposed mitigating gender disputes through free education and adult literacy classes for women's rehabilitation. Her 2002 study traced the trajectory of women in Algeria from active involvement in the war of independence to their later fight against eroding rights and inhumane treatment, especially during the civil war, highlighting ongoing resistance and organized movements. Moreover, in her 2021 research, she explored 20th-century demographic shifts in British-ruled Tanganyika, confronting the absence of precolonial data, questioning conventional fertility assumptions, highlighting the influence of new production modes on family size and child labor, and establishing links between population growth and health decline.

== Works ==
Throughout her academic career, Turshen has authored and edited books on various topics, including exploration of the complex issues associated with the privatization of health services in Africa. In 1984, she authored The Political Ecology of Disease in Tanzania, a book providing an analysis of the effects of colonialism on health in Tanzania, encompassing historical, socio-economic, and policy-related dimensions, spanning both the colonial and post-independence periods. In 1994, she edited What Women Do in Wartime: Gender and Conflict in Africa which provided an account of women's experiences in African civil wars, combining reportage, testimony, and scholarship to discuss their roles as combatants and victims, as well as their responses to war and efforts for change, with a particular focus on gendered political violence such as rape. In 2001, she co-edited a book with S Meintjes and A Pillay, wherein she offered an examination of the complex issues surrounding women in the context of war, post-conflict reconstruction, and societal transformation. In 2010, she edited African Women: A Political Economy, which examined post-Independence political and economic challenges for African women, employing gender and transnational theory to explore themes such as feminism, women's work, and politics, with a central emphasis on labor control and a critical assessment of materialist thought in African women's studies.

In 2016, Turshen authored the book Gender and the Political Economy of Conflict in Africa. The book examined the enduring violence in African conflict zones, employing a political economy framework to analyze its impact on macro-economic and micro-political levels, using case studies from the Democratic Republic of Congo, Sierra Leone, and Tanzania. In her review of the book, Fenella Porter from University of London said "The book is reflective of the extreme messiness of violence and conflict that make up the lives of many women, and for this it is refreshing and ultimately more convincing, and more useful in understanding the persistence of violence in women's lives." Her more recent book, Women's Health Movements: A Global Force for Change, published in 2020, investigated the changing realm of women's health, addressing conservative assaults on reproductive rights, exploring tech-driven women's health movements, presenting country-specific cases, and examining global issues amid economic and political policies.

=== Exhibitions ===
Turshen has explored nature, landscapes, and interior spaces in her art, capturing and expressing them through a blend of abstract and figurative compositions. In 2008 she was inducted as a signature member of the National Association of Women Artists. Her solo exhibitions include Post Scriptum, Ceres Gallery, New York (2009); Sudden Appearances, Viridian Gallery, New York (2010); Imagined Realities, hob’art cooperative gallery, Hoboken, NJ (2014); The Lie of the Land, Edward Williams Gallery, Fairleigh Dickinson University, Hackensack, NJ (2016); Arguments of Light, Beamesderfer Gallery, Highland Park, NJ (2016); New Views of Old Hoboken, Hoboken Historical Museum, Hoboken, NJ (2020); Life Distilled, Alfa Arts Gallery, New Brunswick (2020) and Latitudes/Longitudes/Meridians, Alfa Arts Gallery, New Brunswick, NJ (2021).

Turshen has also participated in many group exhibitions, including the 2010 Binaries, Watchung Arts Center, Watchung, New Jersey; Viridian Artists at Onward Gallery, Tokyo, Japan (2010); The Women in our Lives, hob’art cooperative gallery, Hoboken, NJ (2015); Similarities and Differences, Viridian Gallery, NY (2017); Collages: The Art of Layering, National Association of Women Artists, NYC (2019); and Ingres's Violin: Writers who Paint, The Writers Room, NYC (2022).

== Awards and honors ==
- 1977–78 – Residency, National Science Foundation
- 1984 – Faculty Merit Award, Rutgers University
- 1987 – Residency, Virginia Center for the Creative Arts
- 1989–90 – Fellow, INSERM, Paris, France
- 1993 – Fulbright-Hays Seminars Abroad, North Africa
- 2007 – Leadership in Diversity Award, Rutgers University
- 2009 – Jerome Rose Teaching Award, Rutgers University
- 2011 – Fulbright Chair in Human Rights, University of Ottawa, Canada

== Bibliography ==
=== Books ===
- Political Ecology of Disease in Tanzania (1984) ISBN 978-0813510309
- The Politics of Public Health (1989) ISBN 9780813514222
- Privatizing Health Services in Africa (1999) ISBN 9780813525815
- Gender and the Political Economy of Conflict in Africa: The Persistence of Violence (2016) ISBN 9781138795228
- Women’s Health Movements: A Global Force for Change (2020) ISBN 9789811394669

=== Selected articles ===
- Turshen, M. (1977). The impact of colonialism on health and health services in Tanzania. International Journal of Health Services, 7(1), 7–35.
- Turshen, M. (2000). The political economy of violence against women during armed conflict in Uganda. Social Research, 803–824.
- Turshen, M. (2001). Engendering relations of state to society in the aftermath. The aftermath: Women in post-conflict transformation, 78–96.
- Turshen, M. (2001). The political economy of rape: An analysis of systematic rape and sexual abuse of women during armed conflict in Africa. Victors, perpetrators or actors: Gender, armed conflict and political violence, 55–68.
- Turshen, M. (2002). Algerian women in the liberation struggle and the civil war: From active participants to passive victims?. Social Research: An International Quarterly, 69(3), 889–911
