= Bo Bo Nge =

Burmese banking official

- ဘိုဘိုငယ်

Deputy Governor of the Central Bank of Myanmar
- In office 21 July 2017 – 1 February 2021
- President: Htin Kyaw
- Preceded by: Maw Than
- Governor: Kyaw Kyaw Maung

Personal details
- Born: 21 June 1968 (age 57)
- Citizenship: Myanmar
- Party: National League for Democracy
- Spouse: Hnin Wai Lwin
- Children: 1
- Education: Rangoon University
- Alma mater: Bard College; Johns Hopkins University (MA); SOAS University of London (PhD)
- Occupation: Civil servant; economist

Bo Bo Nge (Burmese: ဘိုဘိုငယ်, also spelt Bobo Nge) is a Burmese civil servant and political prisoner, best known for serving as the Central Bank of Myanmar's deputy governor until the 2021 Myanmar coup d'etat.

== Early life and education ==
Bo Bo Nge was born on 21 June 1968. He attended Rangoon University, as a geology major. After joining the 8888 Uprising protests, he was arrested by the military regime. He spent four and a half years in prison. During his imprisonment, he learned English, becoming fluent in the language. Upon his release, he relocated to Inle Lake in Shan State, launching a successful business to export taro.

He then migrated to Great Barrington, Massachusetts, a town in the United States, sponsored by Ba Win, the provost of Bard College at Simon's Rock. Bo Bo Nge worked as a dishwasher, while studying at Berkshire Community College from 1999 to 2001.

He went on to earn a bachelor's degree in economics and mathematics at Bard College, where he graduated in 2004. Thereafter, he conducted research for the American Institute for Economic Research's American Investment Services. In 2016, he got a master's degree in international economics from Johns Hopkins University's Paul H. Nitze School of Advanced International Studies, and a PhD from SOAS University of London in 2019.

== Career ==
=== Return to Myanmar ===
Bo Bo Nge returned to Myanmar in 2015, after the 2015 Myanmar general election, which marked a major democratic transition. He joined the National League for Democracy's economic committee and also served as KBZ Bank's head of research and risk management. On 12 August 2016, Bo Bo Nge was appointed by the national parliament to the board of directors of the Central Bank of Myanmar, replacing Maw Than, who was appointed in April 2016.

=== Deputy governorship at Myanmar's central bank ===
On 21 July 2017, he was nominated and appointed by President Htin Kyaw to become deputy governor, alongside Soe Min and Soe Thein. During his tenure, he fought corruption and pushed for financial reforms. He also served as the chairperson of the Kyaukphyu Special Economic Zone and a member of the Myanmar Investment Commission.

=== 2021 coup and arrest ===
In the early morning of 1 February 2021, as part of the 2021 Myanmar coup d'état, he was arrested at his home in Naypyidaw by military authorities, as part of a broader movement by the coup leaders to detain prominent individuals connected to the civilian-led government, including Aung San Suu Kyi. His alma mater, SOAS, called for his immediate release. On 1 March, US senator Mitch McConnell committed Bo Bo Nge's story in the Washington Post, entitled "An American success story is lost in Myanmar's coup," to the Congressional Record.

Following his arrest, the military-appointed Anti-Corruption Commission of Myanmar launched an investigation on Bo Bo Nge. On 10 May 2022, the military regime indicted him under corruption charges, invoking Article 55 of the Anti-Corruption Law. Military authorities alleged that he had failed to collect taxes on a US$1.4 million donation from the Open Society Foundation intended to support small and medium enterprises, and that he had mismanaged foreign exchange, banking and accounting operations during his tenure at the Central Bank. The charges were widely criticized as being politically motivated. In December 2022, he was sentenced to 20 years in prison.

In May 2025, while still detained, he was awarded the Bard College Awards 2025's Laszlo Z. Bito Award for Humanitarian Service by his alma mater, Bard College.

== Personal life ==
Bo Bo Nge is married to Hnin Wai Lwin (Me Kyi), and has one son (born c. 2016). He suffers from hypertension and gastrointestinal disease.
