= J. Percy Bruce =

Joseph Percy Bruce
- Born: 1861
- Died: 1934 (aged 72–73)

Joseph Percy Bruce (Chinese: 卜道成; pinyin: Bǔ Dàochéng, 1861–1934) was a British missionary to China. In 1908, he purchased about 360,000 square meters (545 mu) of land to the southwest of the old city of Jinan for the establishment of Cheeloo University. He served as Dean of the theological seminary and later as president of Cheeloo University (from 1916 to 1920). After his return to the United Kingdom, he served as governor of the School of Oriental Studies in London from 1929 to 1931.

In May 1925, Bruce was appointed the first Professor of Chinese at the School of Oriental Studies (later School of Oriental and African Studies, or SOAS), replacing W. Hopkyn Rees, Reader in Chinese, who had died in August 1924. He continued as professor on an annual basis until 1931, when he was replaced by Reginald Johnston. He remained on at SOAS as a language instructor until his death in 1934.

== Works ==
- J. Percy Bruce, The Philosophy of Human Nature by Chu Hsi, Probsthain, London, 1922
- J. Percy Bruce, Chu Hsi and His Masters: An Introduction to Chu Hsi and the Sung School of Chinese Philosophy, Probsthain, London, 1923
- J. Percy Bruce, E. Dora Edwards, C. C. Shu (Chien-Chun Shu), Chinese, Linguaphone Institute, (Linguaphone: Oriental Language Courses), 1930s
- J. Percy Bruce, E. Dora Edwards, She Lao (a.k.a. Lao She), Chinese, Linguaphone Institure, (Linguaphone: Oriental Language Courses), c. 1938
- J. Percy Bruce (editor), Farmers of Forty Centuries; or, Permanent Agriculture in China, Korea and Japan, 1926
