= Central Bank of Myanmar =

Central bank in Myanmar

Coordinates: 19.7915°N 96.1441°E

Central Bank of Myanmar မြန်မာနိုင်ငံတော်ဗဟိုဘဏ်
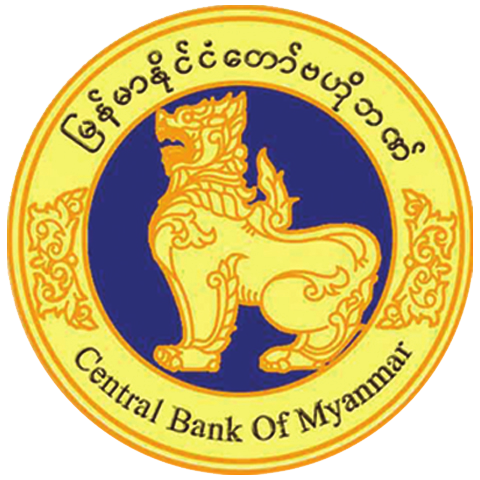
- Seal

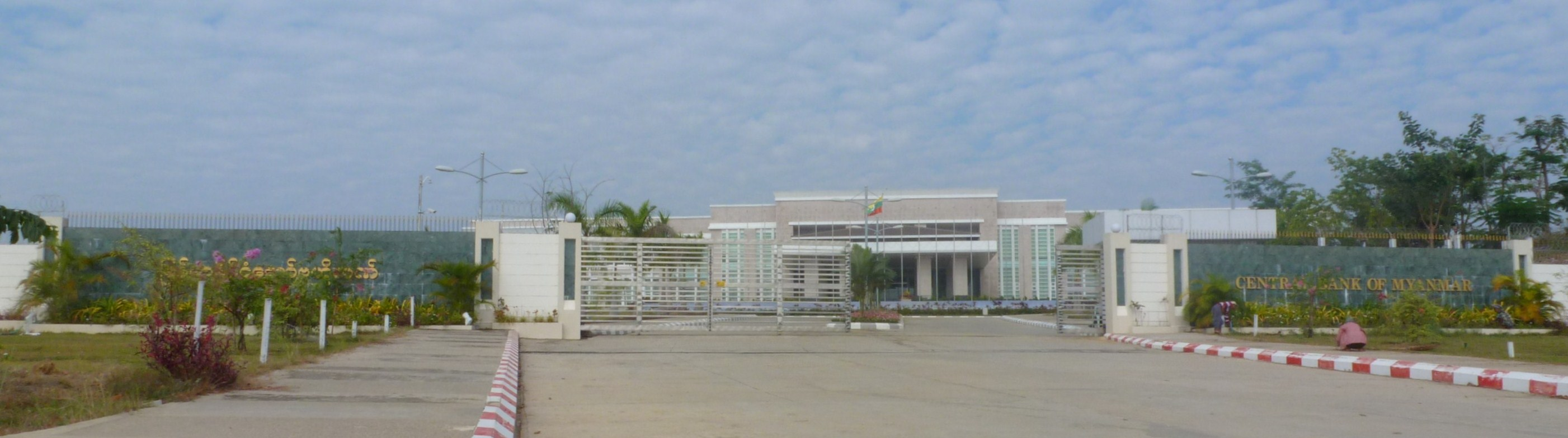
- Headquarters
- Central bank of: Myanmar (Burma)
- Headquarters: Naypyidaw
- Established: 3 April 1948 (as Union Bank of Burma)
- Ownership: 100% state ownership
- Governor: Dr Khin Naing Oo
- Currency: Myanmar kyat MMK (ISO 4217)
- Preceded by: Union Bank of Burma; People's Bank of Union Bank of Burma
- Website: www.cbm.gov.mm

The Central Bank of Myanmar (Burmese: မြန်မာနိုင်ငံတော်ဗဟိုဘဏ်, MLCTS: mranma nuingngamtau bahuibhan; IPA: [mjəmà nàinŋàndɔ̀ bəhòʊbàn]; abbreviated CBM) is the central bank of Myanmar (formerly Burma).

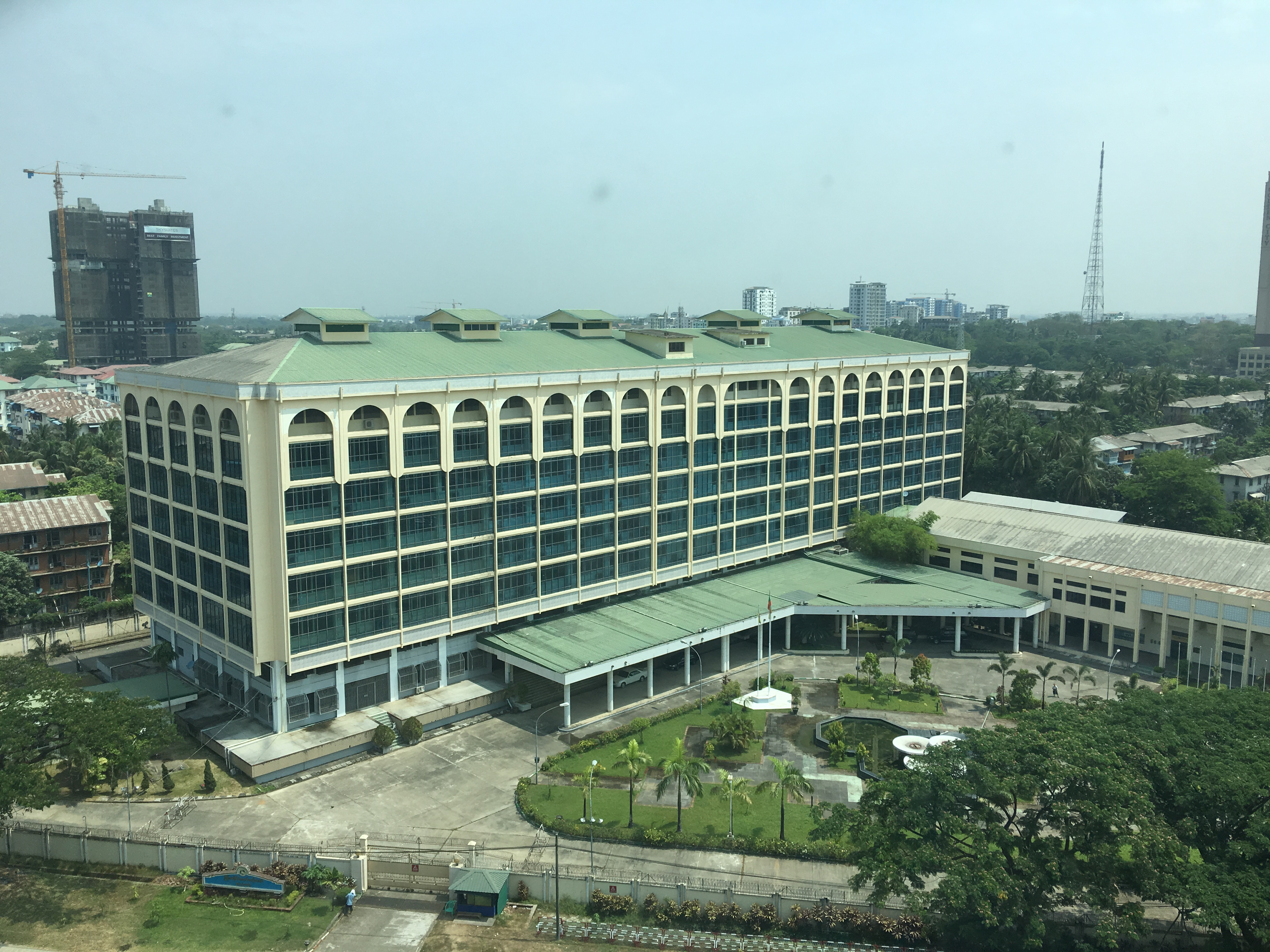
Former headquarters of CBM in Yangon

== Organisation ==
Its headquarter is located in Nay Pyi Taw, and has branches in Yangon and Mandalay.

== History ==
The Central Bank of Myanmar was founded as the Union Bank of Burma on 3 April 1948 by the Union Bank of Burma Act, 1947 and took over the functions of the Rangoon branches of the Reserve Bank of India. The Union Bank of Burma was opened at the corner of Merchant Road and Sule Pagoda Road and had the sole right to issue currency for the country.

In 2013, the Central Bank of Myanmar became an autonomous and independent regulatory body by the Central Bank of Myanmar Law, which was enacted by the Myanmar parliament.

In 2019, the Central Bank began working on a national standard QR payment system. Dubbed MyanmarPay (MMQR), the standard was launched in February 2025.

During the 2021 Myanmar coup d'état, military authorities removed the central bank's civilian-appointed leadership, including governor Kyaw Kyaw Maung, and deputy governor Bo Bo Nge, who was sentenced to 20 years in prison in December 2022 on politically motivated corruption charges.

The State Administration Council appointed Than Nyein in Kyaw Kyaw Maung's place. On 19 August 2022, the SAC appointed Than Than Swe as the governor. She became the first woman to hold the position.

== Role ==
CBM has liberalised the financial organisations for competition, efficiency and integration into the regional financial system. As of the end of October 2020, there are 27 non-banking finance companies that are currently licensed by the Central Bank. According to the changes in the economic requirements of the country, the Central Bank rate has been increased from 10 percent to 12 percent since 1 April 2006.

Agricultural liberalisation speeded up after the elimination of the government procurement system of the main agricultural crops such as rice, pulses, sugarcane, cotton, etc., in 2003–04. The state also reduced the subsidised agricultural inputs, especially fertiliser. With an intention to enhance private participation in trade of agricultural products and inputs, the government is now encouraging export of crops which are in surplus in domestic markets or grown on fallow or waste land, giving opportunities to farmer and private producers.

Upon the guidance of the Ministry of Finance & Revenue, the CBM is responsible for financial stability and supervision of the financial sector in Myanmar. The institutional coverage of the financial supervisory authority includes state-owned banks and private banks in Myanmar. Two main approaches (on-site examination and off-site monitoring) are currently used for supervision, regulation and monitoring of financial stability.

On-site examination involves assessing banks’ financial activities and internal management, to identify areas where corrective action is required and to analyse their banking transactions and financial conditions, ensuring that they are in accordance with existing laws, rules and regulations and the instructions of the CBM by using CAMEL. Off-site monitoring operations are normally based on the weekly, monthly, quarterly and annual reports which are submitted by the banks to the CBM.

The Central Bank has also issued guidelines on the statutory reserve requirement, capital adequacy, liquidity, classification of N.P.L. and provision for bad and doubtful debts, single lending limit, etc. The reserve requirement, liquidity and capital adequacy required to be maintained by financial institutions have been prescribed according to the standards of the Bank for International Settlements (BIS). However, the implementation of Basel II will still take a few more years.

== Organization's Structure ==
=== Divisions ===
1. Governor's Office
2. Administration and Human Resources Development Department
3. Monetary Policy Affairs and Financial Institutions Regulation Department
4. Financial Institutions Supervision Department
5. Accounts Department
6. Foreign Exchange Management Department
7. Currency Management Department

Organizational Chart
Board of Directors	Governor	→	Director-General of Governor's Office	Deputy Director-General	Governor's Office
Board of Directors	Governor	→	Director-General of Governor's Office	Deputy Director-General	Board of Secretary Office
Board of Directors	Governor	Deputy Governor	Director-General of Monetary Policy Affairs and Financial Institutions Regulation Department	Deputy Director-General	Monetary Policy Research and Statistics Department
Board of Directors	Governor	Deputy Governor	Director-General of Monetary Policy Affairs and Financial Institutions Regulation Department	Deputy Director-General	International Relations Department
Board of Directors	Governor	Deputy Governor	Director-General of Monetary Policy Affairs and Financial Institutions Regulation Department	Deputy Director-General	Financial Regulation and Anti-Money Laundering Department
Board of Directors	Governor	Deputy Governor	Director-General of Foreign Exchange Management Department	Deputy Director-General	Foreign Exchange Management Department
Board of Directors	Governor	Deputy Governor	Director-General of Financial Institutions Supervision Department	Deputy Director-General	Financial Institutions Supervision Department
Board of Directors	Governor	Deputy Governor	Director-General of Accounts Department	Deputy Director-General	Accounts Department
Board of Directors	Governor	Deputy Governor	Director-General of Currency Management Department	Deputy Director-General	Currency Administrative Department (Nay Pyi Taw)
Board of Directors	Governor	Deputy Governor	Director-General of Currency Management Department	Deputy Director-General	Currency Administrative Department (Yangon)
Board of Directors	Governor	Deputy Governor	Director-General of Currency Management Department	Deputy Director-General	Currency Administrative Department (Mandalay)
Board of Directors	Governor	Deputy Governor	Director-General of Administration and Human Resources Development Department	Deputy Director-General	Administration and Human Resources Development Department
Board of Directors	Governor	Deputy Governor	Director-General of Administration and Human Resources Development Department	Deputy Director-General	Information and Security
Board of Directors	Governor	Deputy Governor	Director-General of Administration and Human Resources Development Department	Deputy Director-General	Internal Audit

== List of governors ==
#	Name	Took office	Left office
1	Kyaw Nyein	1 July 1954	25 March 1968
2	Kyaw Nyunt	18 December 1971	31 July 1975
3	Aye Hlaing	8 August 1975	12 August 1981
4	Aung Sint	5 September 1981	22 March 1985
5	Kyaw Myint	15 July 1985	11 April 1986
6	Maung Maung Hla	11 April 1986	15 October 1987
7	Maung Maung Han	11 January 1988	27 December 1992
8	Kyi Aye	31 December 1992	2 November 1997
9	Kyaw Kyaw Maung	20 November 1997	11 April 2007
10	Than Nyein	12 April 2007	31 July 2013
11	Kyaw Kyaw Maung	1 August 2013	2 February 2021
12	Than Nyein	2 February 2021	19 August 2022
13	Than Than Swe	19 August 2022	10 April 2026
14	Khin Naing Oo	10 April 2026	Incumbent

== Board of Directors ==
=== 2026 - Present ===
	Name	Position	Took office	Left office	Appointer
1	Dr Khin Naing Oo	Governor	10 April 2026		Min Aung Hlaing
2	U Zaw Myint Naing	Deputy Governor	10 April 2026		Min Aung Hlaing
3	Thet Tun Aung	Deputy Governor	10 April 2026		Min Aung Hlaing
4	Dr Sandar Oo	Deputy Governor	10 April 2026		Min Aung Hlaing
5	Dr Yi Aye	Board Member	10 April 2026		Min Aung Hlaing
6	Tin Myint	Board Member	10 April 2026		Min Aung Hlaing
7	Dr Hla Nyunt	Board Member	10 April 2026		Min Aung Hlaing
8	Dr Zaw Oo	Board Member	10 April 2026		Min Aung Hlaing
9	Dr Phyu Phyu Ei	Board Member	10 April 2026		

=== 2022–2026 ===
Board of Directors (2022–present)
	Name	Position	Took office	Left office	Appointer	Ref
1	Daw Than Than Swe	Governor			SAC	
2	U Zaw Myint Naing	Deputy Governor			SAC	
3	Dr Lin Aung	Deputy Governor			SAC	
4	Dr Khin Naing Oo	Board Member			SAC	
5	U Aung Kyaw Than	Board Member			SAC	
6	U Ye Myint	Board Member			SAC	
7	Dr Zaw Oo	Board Member			SAC	

== See also ==
- Myanmar kyat
- List of banks in Burma
- Economy of Burma
- List of central banks
