= Evangeline Edwards =

British Chinese linguist and academic

- Born: Evangeline Dora Edwards; 13 August 1888
- Died: 29 September 1957 (aged 69)
- Other name: Eve D. Edwards
- Education: University of London
- Scientific career
- Workplaces: SOAS, University of London
- Thesis: Prose literature of the T'ang period as contained in the T'ang Collection of Reprints (1931)

Evangeline Dora Edwards, known as Eve D. Edwards (13 August 1888 – 29 September 1957) taught Chinese language and Chinese literature at SOAS, University of London from 1921 to 1955, and was head of the Department of the Far East from 1937 to 1953. She was the third Professor of Chinese at SOAS, from 1939 to 1947, following J. Percy Bruce (1925–1931) and Reginald Johnston (1931–1937), and the first female professor of Chinese anywhere in the Western world.

== Biography ==
Edwards was born 13 August 1888, the third daughter of a vicar, John Edwards (1857–1934). She went to school at Redbrooke College in Camborne, Cornwall, and later studied at Islington College in London. She then prepared for missionary work by taking a course at St Colm's College in Edinburgh, and in 1913 went to China as a missionary.

After arriving in China, Edwards studied Chinese at the Peking Language School, and continued studying whilst working as a missionary, obtaining a Diploma in Mandarin and Classical Chinese from the school in 1918. From 1915 to 1919 she held a position as principal of the Women's Normal College in Mukden, but she returned to England in 1919.

Edwards joined the staff at the newly-founded School of Oriental Studies (later School of Oriental and African Studies or SOAS) in 1921 as a lecturer, but as she lacked formal qualifications she was not registered as a "recognised teacher" until 1929.

Whilst teaching full-time at SOAS she also studied as an external student at the University of London, and obtained a BA (first class) in Chinese in 1924, and then an MA (with distinction) in 1925. In 1931 she received a D. Lit. from the University of London, with a dissertation on "Prose literature of the T'ang period as contained in the T'ang Collection of Reprints" (i.e. the Tángdài cóngshū 唐代叢書).

In March 1931 Edwards lost out in the competition for the position of Professor of Chinese at SOAS to Reginald Johnston, although two of the appointments committee voted for Edwards over Johnston. She was made Reader in Chinese instead.

The relationship between Johnston and Edwards at SOAS was very poor, and he delegated most of the teaching and administrative duties to Edwards. In one argument with Edwards, Johnston confessed that "I don't profess to understand women and don't know how to deal with them".

In October 1934 Johnston wrote to Charles Otto Blagden, then Dean of SOAS, stating that if the school was unable to support both a professor and a reader of Chinese then he would not object to his position not being renewed. This led to him receiving a notice of the termination of his position at the end of September 1935, but Johnston subsequently fought against this termination, and his position was renewed for a further two years.

In 1935 Johnston took a leave of absence to visit the emperor Puyi in Manchuria, and while he was away Edwards was made acting head of department, and was paid Johnston's salary. In 1937, Johnston retired, and Edwards became acting head of the Far East department. Two years later, in 1939 she was appointed Professor of Chinese at SOAS. She remained head of the department until 1953, but was succeeded as professor by Walter Simon in 1947. In 1951 she became acting head of the Percival David Foundation of Chinese Art that was established by SOAS to house the collection of Chinese ceramics that Sir Percival David had donated to the school.

Edwards retired from SOAS in 1955, and died unexpectedly two years later, on 29 September 1957.

== Contributions ==
Edwards' main area of academic study was Tang dynasty literature and poetry, but she also cooperated with C. O. Blagden on studies of Chinese vocabularies of Malacca Malay (1931) and Cham (1939). She wrote a popular study of Confucius in 1940, and edited anthologies of translations under the titles Dragon Book (1938) and Bamboo, Lotus and Palm (1948).

In addition to her academic studies, she played an important role in the administration of the Far East Department at SOAS, and organizing the running of Chinese, Japanese and Malay language courses during the Second World War. After the war, she helped plan the move of SOAS to its current location in Bloomsbury.

== Selected works ==
- 1937–1938. Chinese Prose Literature of the T'ang Period. London.
- 1938. The Dragon Book. London: William Hodge.
- 1940. Confucius. London: Blackie & Son.
- 1948. Bamboo, Lotus and Palm (an anthology of Far East, South East Asia, and the Pacific). London: William Hodge.
- 1949. "A classified guide to the thirteen classes of Chinese prose"; BSOAS XII: 770–788.
