= Comparison of shopping cart software =

The following is a comparison of the features of notable shopping cart software packages available. Some such shopping cart software is extensible through third-party software components and applications. As such, the features listed below may not encompass all possible features for a given software package. The software listed here is but a fraction of all such packages on the market.

== General information ==
Basic information about the shopping carts including creator, software license and framework, and updates.

Systems listed on a light purple background are no longer in active development.

Name	Creator	First release date	Latest stable version	Latest release date	License	Language	Supported databases	Web application framework	CMS extension
Apache OFBiz	Apache Software Foundation	2007	18.12.16	2024-09-03	Apache 2.0	Java	Apache Derby, MSSQL, MySQL, Oracle, PostgreSQL	Apache OFBiz	integrated, and 3rd party extensions
BigCommerce	BigCommerce Inc	?	Continuous/SaaS	Continuous/SaaS	Proprietary	PHP	Firebird, MySQL		
Drupal Commerce	Drupal Commerce	2011-08-23	2.40	2024-08-22[±]	GPL	PHP	MariaDB, MySQL, Percona Server, PostgreSQL, SQLite, Microsoft SQL Server (module), MongoDB (module)		Drupal
KonaKart	DS Data Systems UK Ltd	?	9.6.0.0	2022-08-31; 2 years ago	GNU LGPL	Java	DB2, MariaDB, MS SQL Server, MySQL, Oracle, PostgreSQL		
Magento	Varien	2007-08-13	2.4.9	2026-05-12[±]	OSL 3.0	PHP	MariaDB, MySQL	Zend Framework	
Miva Merchant	Miva, Inc.	?	9.14	2019-08-07	Proprietary	MIVA Script			
nopCommerce	Nop Solutions Ltd	2008-10-23	5.00.0	2026-10-27; 3 days ago	GPL	C#	MS SQL Server, MySQL, PostgreSQL	ASP.NET MVC	
OpenCart	OpenCart Ltd.	1999-05-11	4.1.0.4	2026-08-11; 2 months ago	GPL	PHP	MariaDB, MySQL, Percona Server, PostgreSQL		
osCommerce	osCommerce	2000-03	4.13	2023-10-13	GNU GPL	PHP	MariaDB, MySQL		
pimcore	pimcore GmbH	2010	12.3.12.1	2026-08-07; 2 months ago[±]	Proprietary	PHP	MariaDB, MySQL, Percona Server, AWS Aurora	Symfony	pimcore
PrestaShop	PrestaShop SA	2007-08-15	9.2.0	2026-09-30; 30 days ago[±]	OSL 3.0	PHP	MariaDB, MySQL	Symfony	
Shopify	Shopify	2006	Continuous/SAAS	Continuous/SAAS	Proprietary	Ruby		Ruby on Rails	
Spree Commerce	Sean Schofield	2007	6.0.1	2026-10-29; 42 hours ago	BSD-3-Clause	Ruby, TypeScript	PostgreSQL, MySQL, SQLite	Ruby on Rails	
SupaDupa	SupaDupa	?	Continuous/SAAS	Continuous/SAAS	Proprietary	Ruby		Ruby on Rails	
uCoz	uCoz Media	?	Continuous/SAAS	Continuous/SAAS	Proprietary	Perl			
VirtueMart	Max Milbers and Team	?	4.2.18	2024-08-20; 2 years ago	GPL	PHP	MariaDB, MySQL, PostgreSQL		Mambo or Joomla!
WooCommerce	WooThemes	2011	6.2.1	2022-02-22	GPL	PHP	MariaDB, MySQL		WordPress
Zen Cart	Zen Ventures	2003-06	2.0.1	2024-05-19[±]	GPL	PHP	MariaDB, MySQL		
	Creator	First release date	Latest stable version	Latest release date	License	Language	Supported databases	Web application framework	CMS extension

== General features ==
Information about the features the shopping carts offer.

	Source code provided	Ajax use	Digital downloads	eBay listing integration	eBay order import	Multiple skins	Point of sale order management	Subscriptions	Taxation	Template engine
Apache OFBiz	Yes	Yes	Yes	Yes	Yes	Yes	Yes	Yes	Yes	Yes
BigCommerce	Yes	Yes	Yes	Yes	Yes	Yes	Yes	No	Yes	Yes
Drupal Commerce	Yes	Yes	Yes	No	No	Yes	Yes	Yes	Yes	Yes
nopCommerce	Yes	Yes	Yes	Yes	Yes	Yes	Yes	Yes	Yes	Yes
Magento	Yes	Yes	Yes	Yes	Yes	Yes	Yes	Yes	Yes	Yes
pimcore	Yes	Yes	Yes	No	No	3rd party	Yes	Yes	Yes	Yes
OpenCart	Yes	Yes	Yes	Add-on	Add-on	Yes	No	Yes	Yes	Yes
osCommerce	Yes	Yes	Yes	Add-on	Add-on	Yes	Yes	Yes	Yes	Yes
PrestaShop	Yes	Yes	Yes	Yes	Yes	Yes	Yes	Yes	Yes	Yes
Shopify	No	Yes	Yes	Yes	Yes	Yes	Yes	No	Yes	Yes
Spree Commerce	Yes	Yes	Yes	No	No	Yes	Yes	No	Yes	Yes
SupaDupa	No	Yes	No	No	No	Yes	Yes	No	Yes	Yes
WooCommerce	Yes	Yes	Yes	Yes	Yes	Yes	Yes	Yes	Yes	Yes
Zen Cart	Yes	Yes	Yes	No	No	Yes	No	Yes	Yes	Yes
	Source code provided	Ajax use	Digital downloads	eBay listing integration	eBay order import	Multiple skins	Point of sale order management	Subscriptions	Taxation	Template engine

== Customer features ==
Information about the features the shopping carts offer.

	Guest account	Customer testimonials	Glossary, tool tip words	Image enlarge	Mini cart	Multiple addresses	Newest products	Newsletter	News	Next-previous product links	Polls	Printing-friendly
Apache OFBiz	Yes	Yes	Yes	Yes	Yes	Yes	Yes	Yes	Yes	Yes	Yes	Yes
BigCommerce	Yes	Add-on	No	Yes	No	Yes	Yes	Yes	Yes	Yes	3rd party	No
Drupal Commerce	Yes	Yes	Add-on	Yes	Yes	Yes	Yes	Yes	Yes	No	Yes	Add-on
KonaKart	Yes	Yes	Yes	Yes	Yes	Yes	Yes	Yes	Yes	Yes	No	Yes
nopCommerce	Yes	Yes	No	Yes	Yes	Yes	Yes	Yes	Yes	No	Yes	No
Magento	Yes	Yes	No	Yes	Yes	Yes	Yes	Yes	No	No	Yes	No
osCommerce	Yes	No	Yes	Yes	Yes	Yes	Yes	Yes	Add-on	Yes	Add-on	No
OpenCart	Yes	Yes	No	Yes	3rd party	Yes	Yes	Yes	Add-on	3rd party	No	Yes
pimcore	Yes	Yes	Yes	Yes	Yes	Yes	Yes	Yes	Yes	Yes	Yes	Yes
PrestaShop	Yes	Yes	Yes	Yes	Yes	Yes	Yes	Yes	Yes	Yes	Yes	Yes
Shopify	Yes	Yes	Yes	Yes	Yes	Yes	Yes	Yes	Yes	Yes	Yes	Yes
Spree Commerce	Yes	Add-on	Yes	Yes	Yes	Yes	Yes	Yes	Yes	Yes	Add-on	Yes
SupaDupa	?	No	Yes	Yes	Yes	No	No	No	Yes	Yes	No	Yes
WooCommerce	Yes	Yes	Yes	Yes	Yes	Yes	Yes	Yes	Yes	Yes	Yes	Yes
Zen Cart	Add-on	Add-on	No	Yes	No	Add-on	Yes	Yes	No	Yes	No	Yes
	Guest account	Customer testimonials	Glossary, tool tip words	Image enlarge	Mini cart	Multiple addresses	Newest products	Newsletter	News	Next-previous product links	Polls	Printing-friendly

	Product image attaching	Product rating	Product reviews	Quotes	Reordering	Returns	Search as user types	Search cloud	Site map, viewable	Social bookmarking	Tell friends	Wish list
Apache OFBiz	Yes	Yes	Yes	Yes	Yes	Yes	Yes	No	Yes	Yes	Yes	Yes
BigCommerce	Yes	3rd party	3rd party	No	Yes	Yes	Yes	No	Yes	Yes	Yes	Yes
Drupal Commerce	Yes	Yes	Yes	No	Yes	Yes	Yes	Yes	Yes	Yes	Yes	Yes
KonaKart	Yes	Yes	Yes	No	Yes	Yes	No	No	No	Yes	Yes	Yes
nopCommerce	Yes	Yes	Yes	Yes	Yes	Yes	Yes	Yes	Yes	Yes	Yes	Yes
Magento	Yes	Yes	Yes	No	Yes	Yes	Yes	Yes	Yes	Yes	Yes	Yes
osCommerce	No	Yes	Yes	No	No	No	Add-on	No	No	Yes	Yes	No
pimcore	Yes	Yes	Yes	Yes	Yes	Yes	Yes	Yes	Yes	Yes	Yes	Yes
PrestaShop	Yes	Yes	Yes	No	Yes	Yes	Yes	Yes	Yes	Yes	Yes	Yes
Shopify	Yes	Yes	Yes	Yes	Yes	Yes	3rd party	3rd party	Yes	Yes	Yes	Yes
Spree Commerce	Yes	Add-on	Add-on	Yes	Yes	Yes	Yes	Yes	Yes	Yes	Yes	Yes
SupaDupa	Yes	No	No	Yes	Yes	No	Yes	No	Yes	No	Yes	No
WooCommerce	Yes	Yes	Yes	Yes	Yes	Yes	Yes	Yes	Yes	Yes	Yes	Yes
Zen Cart	Yes	Yes	Yes	Yes	No	Add-on	3rd party	No	Yes	Add-on	Yes	Add-on
	Product image attaching	Product rating	Product reviews	Quotes	Reordering	Returns	Search as user types	Search cloud	Site map, viewable	Social bookmarking	Tell friends	Wish list

== Customer reward features ==
Information about the features the shopping carts offer.

	Coupons	Gift certificates	Membership discounts	Membership-only categories	Membership-only products	Reward points	Special offers
Apache OFBiz	Yes	Yes	Yes	No	Yes	No	Yes
BigCommerce	Yes	Yes	Yes	Yes	Yes	3rd party	Yes
Drupal Commerce	Yes	Yes	Yes	Yes	Yes	No	Yes
KonaKart	Yes	Yes	Yes	Yes	Yes	Yes	Yes
Magento	Yes	Yes	Yes	Yes	Yes	Yes (Enterprise Edition)	Yes
nopCommerce	Yes	Yes	Yes	Yes	Yes	Yes	Yes
osCommerce	Add-on	Add-on	No	No	No	No	Yes
pimcore	Yes	Yes	Yes	Yes	Yes	Yes	Yes
PrestaShop	Yes	Yes	Yes	Yes	Yes	Yes	Yes
Shopify	Yes	Yes	Yes	Yes	Yes	Yes	Yes
Spree Commerce	Yes	Yes	Yes	Yes	Yes	Yes	Yes
SupaDupa	Yes	Yes	No	No	No	No	Yes
WooCommerce	Yes	Yes	Yes	Yes	Yes	Yes	Yes
Zen Cart	Yes	Yes	Yes	Add-on	Add-on	Yes	Yes
	Coupons	Gift certificates	Membership discounts	Membership-only categories	Membership-only products	Reward points	Special offers

== Administration area features ==
Information about the features the shopping carts offer.

	Product import-export	Statistics	Stock control	WYSIWYG editor
Apache OFBiz	Yes	Yes	Yes	Yes
BigCommerce	Yes	Yes	Yes	Yes
Drupal Commerce	Yes	Yes	Yes	Yes
KonaKart	Yes	Yes	Yes	Yes
Magento	Yes	Yes	Yes	Yes
nopCommerce	Yes	Yes	Yes	Yes
osCommerce	add-on	Yes	Yes	add-on
pimcore	Yes	Yes	Yes	Yes
PrestaShop	Yes	Yes	Yes	Yes
Shopify	Yes	Yes	Yes	No
Spree Commerce	Yes	Yes	Yes	Yes
SupaDupa	Yes	Yes	Yes	No
WooCommerce	Yes	Yes	Yes	Yes
Zen Cart	add-on	Yes	Yes	add-on
	Product import-export	Statistics	Stock control	WYSIWYG editor

== Search engine optimization features ==
Information about the features the shopping carts offer.

	HTML catalog	Meta tagging	RSS feeds	SEO URLs	Site map, XML	GoodRelations RDFa
Apache OFBiz	Yes	Yes	No	Yes	Yes	No
BigCommerce	Yes	Yes	Yes	Yes	Yes	No
Drupal Commerce	Yes	Yes	Yes	Yes	Yes	Yes
KonaKart	Yes	Yes	Yes	Yes	No	No
Magento	Yes	Yes	Yes	Yes	Yes	No
nopCommerce	Yes	Yes	Yes	Yes	Yes	No
osCommerce	No	No	add-on	Yes	add-on	Yes
pimcore	Yes	Yes	Yes	Yes	Yes	Yes
PrestaShop	Yes	Yes	Yes	Yes	Yes	Yes
Shopify	Yes	Yes	Yes	Yes	Yes	No
Spree Commerce	Yes	Yes	Yes	Yes	Yes	No
SupaDupa	Yes	Yes	No	Yes	Yes	No
WooCommerce	Yes	Yes	Yes	Yes	Yes	Yes
Zen Cart	add-on	Yes	add-on	add-on	add-on	No
	HTML catalog	Meta tagging	RSS feeds	SEO URLs	Site map, XML	GoodRelations RDFa

== Security features ==
Information about the features the shopping carts offer.

	Access control list	Form CAPTCHA	Staff action logging	PA/DSS certified
Apache OFBiz	Yes	Yes	Yes	No
BigCommerce	Yes	Yes	Yes	No
Drupal Commerce	Yes	add-on	Yes	No
KonaKart	Yes	No	Yes	No
Magento	Yes	Yes	enterprise	No
Miva Merchant	No	Yes	No	Yes
nopCommerce	Yes	Yes	Yes	No
osCommerce	Yes	No	No	No
pimcore	Yes	No	No	No
PrestaShop	Yes	Yes	No	No
Shopify	Yes	Yes	Yes	No
Spree Commerce	Yes	Yes	Yes	No
SupaDupa	Yes	No	No	No
WooCommerce	No	add-on	No	No
Zen Cart	Yes	add-on	Yes	No
	Access control list	Form CAPTCHA	Staff action logging	PA/DSS certified

== Other features ==
Information about the features the shopping carts offer.

	Multiple store fronts	Affiliates	API (remote management functions)	Minimum orders	Multiple vendor support	Out-of-the-box shopping cart
Apache OFBiz	Yes	Yes	Yes	Yes	No	Yes
BigCommerce	No	3rd party	Yes	Yes	Yes	Yes
Drupal Commerce	Yes	Yes	Yes	Yes	Yes	Yes
KonaKart	No	No	Yes	Yes	Yes	Yes
Magento	Yes	3rd party	Yes	Yes	Yes	Yes
nopCommerce	Yes	Yes	Yes	Yes	Yes	Yes
osCommerce	No	No	No	Yes	No	Yes
pimcore	Yes	Yes	Yes	Yes	Yes	No
PrestaShop	Yes	Yes	Yes	Yes	Yes	Yes
Shopify	No	Yes	Yes	Yes	Yes	Yes
Spree Commerce	Yes	3rd party	Yes	Yes	Yes	Yes
SupaDupa	No	No	No	No	No	Yes
WooCommerce	No	Yes	Yes	No	Yes	No
Zen Cart	add-on	3rd party	No	add-on	No	Yes
	Multiple store fronts	Affiliates	API (remote management functions)	Minimum orders	Multiple vendor support	Out-of-the-box shopping cart

== Payment gateway support ==
Information about which payment gateways are supported.

	Authorize.Net AIM	Authorize.Net SIM	Barclaycard CPI	Barclaycard MPI	HSBC API	HSBC CPI	PayPal Standard
Apache OFBiz	Yes	No	No	No	No	No	Yes
BigCommerce	Yes	Yes	No	No	No	No	Yes
Drupal Commerce	Yes	No	No	No	No	No	Yes
KonaKart	Yes	Yes	No	No	No	No	Yes
Magento	Yes	3rd party	Yes	Yes	Yes	Yes	Yes
nopCommerce	Yes	Yes	No	No	No	No	Yes
osCommerce	Yes	Yes	No	No	No	No	Yes
pimcore	No	No	No	No	No	No	No
PrestaShop	Yes	Yes	Yes	Yes	Yes	Yes	Yes
Shopify	Yes	Yes	No	Yes	No	No	Yes
WooCommerce	Yes	Yes	No	No	No	No	Yes
Zen Cart	Yes	Yes	No	No	No	No	Yes
	Authorize.Net AIM	Authorize.Net SIM	Barclaycard CPI	Barclaycard MPI	HSBC API	HSBC CPI	PayPal Standard

	Skrill	Stripe	PayPal Pro	PayPal Payflow Link	PayPal Payflow Pro	Sage Pay Form	Sage Pay Direct	USAePay	WorldPay	Offline processing	Offline methods
Apache OFBiz	No	No	No	No	No	No	No	No	Yes	Yes	Yes
BigCommerce	No	Yes	Yes	Yes	Yes	Yes	Yes	Yes	Yes	Yes	Yes
Drupal Commerce	Yes	Yes	Yes	Yes	Yes	No	Yes	Yes	Yes	Yes	No
KonaKart	Yes	No	No	No	Yes	No	No	Yes	Yes	Yes	Yes
Magento	Yes	Yes	Yes	Yes	Yes	Yes	Yes	3rd party	Yes	Yes	Yes
nopCommerce	Yes	Yes	Yes	Yes	Yes	Yes	Yes	3rd party	Yes	Yes	Yes
osCommerce	Yes	Yes	Yes	No	No	Yes	Yes	No	No	Yes	Yes
pimcore	No	No	No	No	No	No	No	No	No	No	No
PrestaShop	Yes	Yes	Yes	No	No	No	No	No	Yes	Yes	Yes
Shopify	Yes	Yes	Yes	Yes	Yes	Yes	Yes	Yes	Yes	Yes	Yes
Spree Commerce	No	Yes	Yes	Yes	Yes	No	No	No	No	No	Yes
WooCommerce	No	Yes	Yes	Yes	Yes	Yes	Yes	No	Yes	Yes	Yes
Zen Cart	Yes	Yes	Yes	No	add-on	No	Yes	Yes	Yes	add-on	Yes
	Skrill	Stripe	PayPal Pro	PayPal Payflow Link	PayPal Payflow Pro	Sage Pay Form	Sage Pay Direct	USAePay	WorldPay	Offline processing	Offline methods

== Alternative checkout support ==
Information about which alternative checkouts are supported.

	Amazon Pay	Google Checkout	PayPal Express
Apache OFBiz	Yes	Yes	Yes
BigCommerce	Yes	No	Yes
Drupal Commerce	add-on	Yes	Yes
Magento	add-on	Yes	Yes
nopCommerce	Yes	Yes	Yes
osCommerce	add-on	No	Yes
pimcore	No	No	No
PrestaShop	Yes	Yes	Yes
Shopify	Yes	Yes	Yes
Spree Commerce	add-on	Yes	Yes
WooCommerce	Yes	Yes	Yes
Zen Cart	add-on	add-on	Yes
	Checkout by Amazon	Google Checkout	PayPal Express

== Real-time shipping calculation ==
Information about if shopping carts have real-time shipping calculation built-in to allow calculating how much it will cost to ship an order in real time when the customer checks out an order.

	Australia Post	Canada Post	DHL	FedEx	OnTrac	United States Postal Service	UPS	Purolator
Apache OFBiz	No	No	Yes	Yes	No	Yes	Yes	No
BigCommerce	Yes	Yes	No	Yes	No	Yes	Yes	No
KonaKart	No	No	No	Yes	No	Yes	Yes	No
Magento	No	Yes	Yes	Yes	No	Yes	Yes	Yes
nopCommerce	Yes	Yes	No	Yes	No	Yes	Yes	No
osCommerce	No	No	No	No	No	No	No	No
PrestaShop	Yes	Yes	No	Yes	No	Yes	Yes	Yes
Shopify	No	add-on	No	No	No	Yes	Yes	No
Spree Commerce	Yes	Yes	Yes	Yes	No	Yes	Yes	No
WooCommerce	No	Yes	No	No	No	Yes	No	No
Zen Cart	add-on	add-on	add-on	add-on	Yes	add-on	Yes	Yes
	Australia Post	Canada Post	DHL	FedEx	OnTrac	United States Postal Service	UPS	Purolator

== Shipment booking integration ==
Information about if shopping carts have shipment booking integration to allow staff to be able to book shipments for a number of orders at once via the control panel.

	Australia Post	Canada Post	DHL	FedEx	OnTrac	United States Postal Service	UPS
Apache OFBiz	No	No	No	No	No	No	No
BigCommerce	Yes	Yes	No	Yes	No	Yes	Yes
KonaKart	No	No	No	Yes	No	Yes	Yes
Magento	No	No	No	No	No	No	No
nopCommerce	No	No	No	No	No	No	No
osCommerce	No	No	No	No	No	No	No
PrestaShop	webservice	No	No	No	No	No	No
Shopify	No	No	No	No	No	No	No
Spree Commerce	Yes	Yes	Yes	Yes	No	Yes	Yes
WooCommerce	Yes	Yes	No	No	No	Yes	No
Zen Cart	No	No	No	Yes	Yes	Yes	Yes
	Australia Post	Canada Post	DHL	FedEx	OnTrac	United States Postal Service	UPS

== Shipment tracking integration ==
Information about if shopping carts have shipment tracking integration to show the customers the tracking information on the "View order" pages.

	Australia Post	Canada Post	DHL	FedEx	United States Postal Service	UPS
Apache OFBiz	No	No	Yes	Yes	Yes	Yes
BigCommerce	Yes	Yes	No	Yes	Yes	Yes
KonaKart	No	No	No	Yes	Yes	Yes
Magento	No	No	Yes	Yes	Yes	Yes
nopCommerce	No	No	No	Yes	Yes	Yes
osCommerce	No	No	No	No	No	No
PrestaShop	webservice	No	No	Yes	Yes	Yes
Shopify	No	No	No	No	No	No
Spree Commerce	Yes	Yes	Yes	Yes	Yes	Yes
WooCommerce	Yes	Yes	No	No	Yes	No
Zen Cart	No	No	add-on	add-on	add-on	add-on
	Australia Post	Canada Post	DHL	FedEx	United States Postal Service	UPS

== See also ==
- E-commerce
- Online shopping
- Types of e-commerce
