= OpenCart =

ECommerce platform for creating online stores

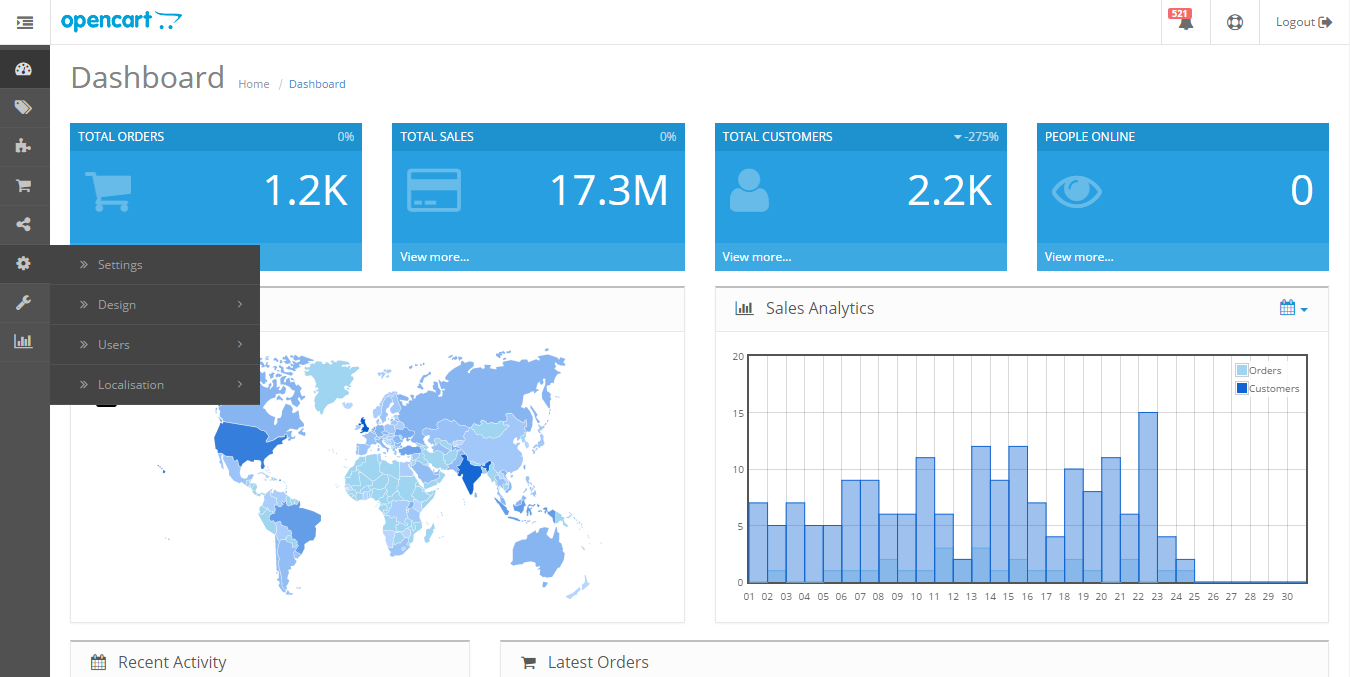
- Developer: OpenCart Limited
- Initial release: April 2010
- Stable release: 4.1.0.3 / 2025-03-24; 13 months ago
- Written in: PHP, JavaScript
- Operating system: Cross-platform
- Type: Shopping cart software
- License: GNU General Public License
- Website: www.opencart.com
- Repository: OpenCart Repository

OpenCart is an online store management system developed by Hong Kong–based OpenCart Limited. It is PHP-based, using a MySQLi (MySQL, MariaDB, Percona Server) or PostgreSQL database and HTML components. Support is provided for different languages and currencies. It is freely available under the GNU General Public License.

== History ==
OpenCart was originally developed in 1998 by Christopher G. Mann for Walnut Creek CDROM and later The FreeBSD Mall. The first public release was on May 11, 1999. Developed in Perl, the project saw little activity, and progress stalled in 2000, with Mann posting a message on April 11 stating "other commitments are keeping me from OpenCart development".

The domain expired in February 2005 before being revived by Daniel Kerr, a UK-based developer, who used it as the basis for his own e-commerce software, written in PHP. The first stable release was version 1.1.1, released onto Google Code on February 11, 2009.

In September 2014, Kerr claimed that OpenCart was the number one e-commerce software supplier in China while in August 2015 it was recorded as responsible for 6.42% of the global e-commerce volumes recorded by builtwith.com, behind WooCommerce and Magento and ahead of OSCommerce, ZenCart and Shopify. In February 2017, he stated that OpenCart had about 317,000 live OpenCart sites, which was, according to Kerr, more than Shopify or Magento.

Version 2.0 of the software was released in October 2014, featuring an extensive update of the interface.

Version 2.2.0.0 of the software was released in March 2016, after months of testing from OpenCart users.

Version 3.0.3.7 of the software was released in February 2021.

Version 3.0.4.1 of the software was released in May, 2025 with the help of Dr.Vk one the main software professional in opencart .

Version 4.1.0.3 of the software was released on March 24, 2025.

== Features ==
=== Anti-Fraud ===
OpenCart uses fraud management services such as FraudLabs, ClearSale and Global Payments to review customer orders.

=== Payments ===
The OpenCart package offers a variety of payment methods, from bank transfers to online payment gateways. The available core payment methods in an OpenCart installation are as follows: 2Checkout, Authorize.Net, Amazon Payments, Bank Transfer, Cash On Delivery, Klarna, PayPal, Skrill, SagePay and many more.

== Publications ==
- Yilmaz, Murat (August 2010). OpenCart 1.4: Beginner's Guide. Packt Publishing. p. 240. ISBN 9781849513029. Archived from the original on 2014-08-02.
- Hasan, Tahsin (March 2011). OpenCart 1.4 Template Design Cookbook. Packt Publishing. p. 328. ISBN 9781849514309. Archived from the original on 2014-08-02.
- Watson, Kerry R (March 2012). ShowMe Guides OpenCart 1.5 User Manual. CreateSpace Independent Publishing Platform. p. 352. ISBN 978-1468142365.
- Mihail Savov (August 2016). The Definitive Guide to Getting Started with OpenCart 2.x For Beginners. iSenseLabs. p. 140. ISBN 978-0-9966004-5-3.
- iSenseLabs (2015). OpenCart 2.0 Tips and Tricks #2. iSenseLabs. p. 118. ISBN 978-0-9966004-1-5.

== Security Vulnerabilities ==
As of November 22, 2023, there have been 23 reported issues on CVE Details, six having a score of 8.0 or above.

== Controversies ==
OpenCart's developer and owner, Daniel Kerr, has been criticized for his hostility towards volunteer security researchers who reported "serious" security vulnerabilities in OpenCart.

The difficulty of contacting OpenCart to report security concerns has also been noted.

== See also ==
- Comparison of shopping cart software
- List of online payment service providers
