= VirtueMart =

Content management system software

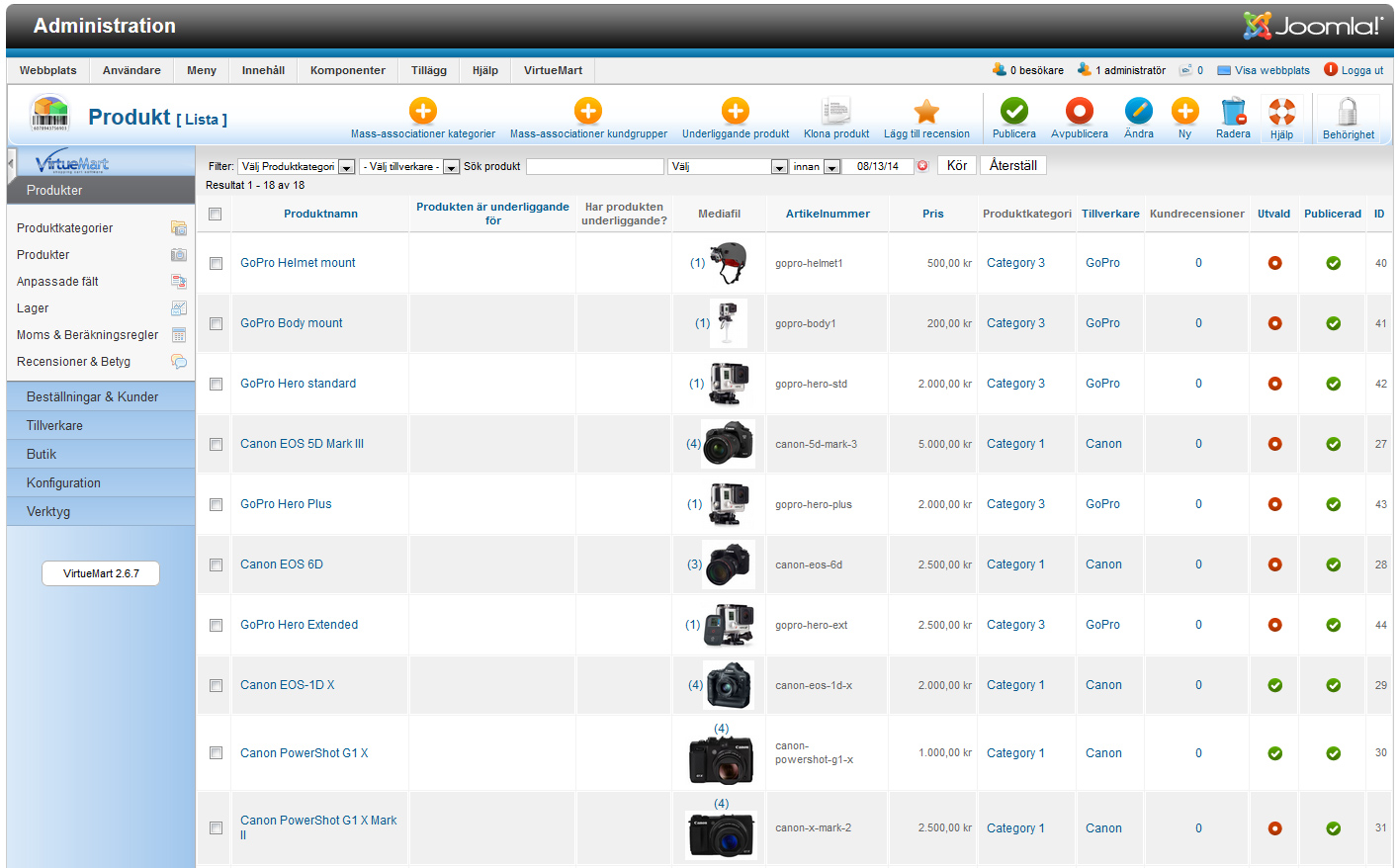
- Virtuemart’s administration page
- Original author: Sören Eberhardt-Biermann
- Developers: Max Milbers and Team
- Release: 1997
- Stable release: 4.2.18 / 20 August 2024; 2 years ago
- Operating system: Cross-platform
- Type: Webshop
- License: GNU General Public License
- Website: virtuemart.net

VirtueMart (formerly known as mambo-phpShop) is an open-source e-commerce application designed as an extension of the Mambo or Joomla! content management systems (CMS). VirtueMart is written in PHP and requires the MySQL database environment for storage. It is best suited for low to medium level traffic web-sites.

== History ==
VirtueMart began as offshoot of the stand-alone phpShop e-commerce web application. Originally dubbed mambo-phpShop it became the first substantial native e-commerce component for the Mambo CMS system. After the community forked Mambo into Joomla, the developer re-branded mambo-phpShop as VirtueMart, officially supporting the newer Joomla CMS. While current implementations may still function with Mambo CMS, and older editions of mambo-phpShop are still available to download, they are no longer actively supported.

Originally developed by Sören Eberhardt-Biermann, in September 2009 a new team began developing VirtueMart 2. The new version was released in December 2011. In October 2012 the developer team declared end of life for VirtueMart 1.1 and since then VirtueMart 2 is no longer maintaining Joomla 1.5 compatibility.

== Features ==
VirtueMart supports an unlimited number of products and categories, with products assignable to multiple categories. Until version 3, it permitted the sale of downloadable products. That functionality is now mostly supported by separate, subscription plugins. It offers a catalog mode where the shopping cart features are turned off. VirtueMart supports multiple prices for a single product, based around shopper groups or a quantity range, and permits the use of a variety of different payment gateways.

Because VirtueMart is an open-source e-commerce solution all the application code is openly visible in PHP. This allows PHP developers to view, update or customize the operation of the shopping cart. In addition VirtueMart itself offers simplified templates (called 'fly pages' in VirtueMart) structure that allows various shopping and cart page(s) to be edited as standard HTML and CSS.

Notably new to VirtueMart 1.1.0 was the inclusion of the ability quickly to change themes for category, product, checkout and cart pages. The cart is also integrated with Rapid 3.0, which enables transaction data to be sent directly from the customer's browser to the payment gateway without passing through the merchant's systems.

Virtuemart is supported by an iPhone app by iVMStore.

== Usage ==
VirtueMart has been adopted by over 269,000 online retailers.

For the week of Sep 23rd 2013, Quantcast data collated by BuiltWith Trends indicated that VirtueMart ran on 1.47% of the top 10K sites, 3.25% of the top 100K sites, and 6.02% of the top million sites.

== Requirements ==
As VirtueMart is only a plugin for Joomla! / Mambo, it has the same system requirements.

Several other required supporting libraries or extensions include MySQL, XML and Zlib support built into PHP. Support for HTTPS (OpenSSL) and cURL is recommended.

== Compatibility ==
- VirtueMart 1.1.x is compatible with Joomla 1.5.x.
- VirtueMart 2.0.x is compatible with Joomla 2.5.x.
- VirtueMart 2.6.x is compatible with Joomla 2.5.x.
- VirtueMart 2.9.x is compatible with Joomla 3.x.
- VirtueMart 3.0.x is compatible with Joomla 2.5.x and Joomla 3.x.

== See also ==
- Comparison of shopping cart software
- List of online payment service providers
