= Omnisend =

Marketing software

- Founded: 2014; 12 years ago
- Founders: Rytis Lauris; Justas Kriukas
- Headquarters: London
- Products: Email marketing SMS marketing
- Services: Marketing Automation
- Website: www.omnisend.com

Omnisend is a marketing automation platform for ecommerce businesses, focusing on email and SMS marketing. It is designed by the company Omnisend, established in 2014 under the name Soundest. Omnisend is headquartered in London, United Kingdom.

== History ==
Rytis Lauris and Justas Kriukas founded Soundest in 2014, which was rebranded to Omnisend in November 2017. In 2018, the company added SMS marketing features.

In 2019, Omnisend became one of the top-five marketing apps on Shopify and was listed in G2's selection of the Top 50 Products for Marketers 2019. On 16 September 2020, Omnisend invested in Outfunnel, a startup specialising in integrating CRMs with automated emails. In 2020, the company opened a U.S. office.

In 2021 and 2022, Omnisend was ranked 75 and 85 respectively in the ranking of Europe's fastest-growing companies. In 2023 Omnisend was included in 270 position. The following year, Omnisend became a Bronze winner in the 18th annual The Stevie Awards.

In 2024, Omnisend launched a new feature “Product reviews” for Shopify merchants. Omnisend has native integration with e-commerce platforms like Shopify, WooCommerce, BigCommerce, Wix.com and other platforms.

== Operations ==
The platform provides email and SMS automation features. It has a library of adjustable templates and drag-and-drop builder with preview on different devices for creating email campaigns and allows sending them to contacts. It allows users to add products from online stores into their marketing emails and segment email lists, and is integrated with Shopify, WooCommerce, BigCommerce, and Wix. The platform also includes features for automation and personalization of SMS marketing and Web push notifications.

It has more than 100,000 customers.

== Review ==
Omnisend earns a commendable 4 out of 5 stars from TechRadar, praised for its features, seamless integration and round-the-clock support.
