= Mailrelay =

Email marketing web service

- Release: 2001
- Stable release: Version 3
- Available in: Spanish English Portuguese
- License: Owner

Mailrelay is a web service for email marketing and a proprietary software for sending mailings, newsletters and analysis of email campaigns.

This email marketing platform has the added advantage of being able to use most of its features on its free plan.

== Features ==
It was created in 2001 by the company hosting ConsultorPC as an additional service to its customers, and in 2011 began operating independently as a provider of email, offering among its features sending newsletters, filters and statistics.

Its servers are located in Europe, and it has free and paid plans.

Software version 3 was released in March 2019.

== Plugins and tools ==
=== Plugins ===
Extensions:

- Drupal
- Joomla
- Magento
- Opencart
- PrestaShop
- Sugar CRM
- vBulletin
- Wordpress
- Zen Cart

=== Tools ===
- Application for iPhone
- Synchronization with Windows Contact
