= Eway =

Eway, E-Way, or any other variant, may refer to:

- eWay, global electronic payment system
- eway, an electronic street map application for Australia by Ausway
- E-way, abbreviation of expressway
- e-way, electronic toll-type toll road
- E-Way (1990 song), song by Dirty District from the 1990 album Pousse au crime et Longueurs de temps
- EWAY, light rail and bus system proposed for Belfast, Northern Ireland, UK
