= Spree Commerce =

Open-source headless e-commerce platform

- Original authors: Sean Schofield, Damian Legawiec
- Developers: Spree Commerce, Inc., Spark Solutions, Vendo
- Release: 2007
- Stable release: 6.0.1 / 29 October 2026; 1 day ago
- Written in: Ruby, TypeScript
- Platform: Ruby on Rails
- Type: Online shopping
- License: BSD-3-Clause
- Website: spreecommerce.org
- Repository: github.com/spree/spree

Spree Commerce is an open-source headless e-commerce platform. It provides REST APIs that allow Next.js storefront developers, mobile app developers, and SaaS platforms to build commerce experiences against a shared backend.

It was created by Sean Schofield in 2007 and has since had over 800 contributors. The project has gained over 15,000 stars on GitHub, and has been downloaded almost 3 million times.

Companies using Spree included Goop (company), Craftsman, Kenmore, DieHard, New England Patriots, Blue Bottle Coffee, Fortnum and Mason, GoDaddy, Everlane, and Surfdome.

== Features ==
Spree 6.0, released in October 2026 under the BSD-3-Clause license, includes:

- a multi-vendor marketplace: vendor onboarding and approval, commission rules, a ledger of vendor earnings, vendor payouts, and a separate vendor dashboard
- B2B commerce: company accounts with divisions, customer-specific catalogs and prices, and purchase order numbers on orders
- cross-border selling: markets with their own currencies and languages, VAT numbers, product customs details, and customs duties charged on the order
- inventory management with purchase orders and suppliers
- fulfilment and tracking, returns and exchanges, promotions, and built-in reports
- tools for data privacy requests and consent records

=== Architecture ===
Spree 6 provides a REST API with typed clients for its storefront, admin and seller interfaces, an admin dashboard built with React, an official Docker image, and a Model Context Protocol server through which AI assistants can work in a store. A Next.js storefront starter is available under the MIT license.

== Licensing ==
Spree Commerce is licensed under the open-source BSD-3-Clause license — free to use, modify, and distribute for any purpose, including commercial use.

Spree ecosystem packages (starters, SDKs, payment integrations, and extensions) are licensed under the MIT license.

In Spree 5, the Multi-Store module (spree_multi_store) was available under the AGPL v3, which is an OSI-approved open-source license, with a Commercial License option available for those who wish to keep their code changes private. Single-store installations were not affected by this.

== Spree Commerce history ==
On July 1, 2011, Spree received $1.5 million in seed funding from AOL and True Ventures. On February 25, 2014, Spree raised an additional $5M in Series A funding led by Thrive Capital. Also participating were Vegas Tech Fund (led by Zappos CEO Tony Hsieh), Red Swan (led by Bonobos CEO Andy Dunn) as well as existing investors True Ventures and AOL Ventures.

On September 21, 2015, it was acquired by First Data. After the First Data acquisition, developers from Spark Solutions and VinSol now maintain and develop the Spree Commerce Open Source project. Vinsol also develops Spree extensions.

In 2016 an OpenCommerce Conference was held in New York to showcase the newest e-commerce projects running on Spree.

In 2021, Spree transitioned from a monolithic architecture to an API-first, headless model, introducing REST APIs that decoupled the commerce backend from the frontend presentation layer. A JavaScript SDK was released to support developers building storefronts against the Spree API.

On April 2, 2025, Spree 5.0 was released, splitting the project into a free Community Edition (BSD-3-Clause) and a commercial Enterprise Edition with B2B, marketplace, and multi-tenant modules. Spree 5 also upgraded the APIs to conform to the OpenAPI 3.0 specification.

In April 2026, Spree 5.4 introduced a TypeScript SDK, a Next.js storefront starter, a provider-agnostic Payment Sessions API supporting Stripe, Adyen, and PayPal, and a Markets system for managing multiple countries with per-region currencies, languages, and payment configurations from a single installation.

On October 27, 2026, Spree 6.0 was released, adding marketplace and B2B features to the open-source edition, a React admin dashboard, and a Model Context Protocol server for AI assistants.

== See also ==
- Comparison of free and open source eCommerce web application framework
