= Drupal Commerce =

- Developer(s): Open-source community, led by Commerce Guys
- Initial release: 23 August 2011
- Stable release: 2.40 / 2024-08-22[±]
- Written in: PHP
- Operating system: Cross-platform
- Type: Webshop, Shopping cart
- License: GNU General Public License
- Website: www.drupalcommerce.org

Drupal Commerce is open-source eCommerce software that augments the content management system Drupal. Within the context of a Drupal-based site, Drupal Commerce presents products for purchase; walks customers through the checkout process; keeps track of invoices, receipts, orders, and payments; facilitates shipping and payment; and performs other functions needed by online merchants.

== History ==
Drupal Commerce was created by Commerce Guys under the leadership of Ryan Szrama, the author of shopping-cart software Übercart. It was originally born as a rearchitecture project of Übercart, and was called "Übercore" until January 14, 2010, when Mr. Szrama renamed it "Drupal Commerce". Version 1.0 was released on August 23, 2011.

Drupal Commerce has had steady growth since its introduction. As of December 2023, over 42,000 active sites use it, including U.K. postal service Royal Mail, international language school Eurocentres, McDonald's (France), and hundreds of consumer brands. The Drupal Commerce market has also supported publication of several instructional books and video courses.

== Extending Drupal Commerce ==
Like Drupal itself, Drupal Commerce can be extended through the use of modules that add functionality and themes that define visual presentation. There are more than 300 Drupal Commerce-specific modules available for free in such categories as payment gateways, shipping service providers, and administrative and development tools.

== See also ==
- Comparison of shopping cart software
- Drupal - Wikipedia
