= Eurostop =

Software companies of the United Kingdom

- Industry: Technology industry
- Founded: 1990, UK
- Headquarters: Ealing, London, UK
- Area served: United Kingdom, Singapore, China and Hong Kong
- Key people: Richard Loh (Founder and CEO)
- Products: EPoS, Stock Control & Merchandise Management, Fulfilment, Business Intelligence, Tenant Management System
- Website: www.eurostop.com

Eurostop is an international retail technology company that provides point-of-sale (EPOS) and other retail services to retailers in the UK. Eurostop's software is intended for stock control, merchandising, fulfilment, e-commerce and sales management. The company's headquarters are in London, with other offices in Singapore and China.

== History ==
Eurostop was founded in the UK in 1990 by current CEO Richard Loh. The company's first product was a stock control system, and in 1994, they expanded to till systems. In 2007, they opened an office in Singapore, and this followed with further offices in Shanghai in 2008, Xiamen, China in 2013, and Hong Kong in 2016.

In 2014, Eurostop released its Estate Manager module intended for larger retailers to monitor the status of their worldwide EPOS systems from a remote dashboard.

In 2015, Eurostop was awarded Retail Systems Technology Vendor of the Year Award.

== Features ==
Eurostop software can be hosted on a retailer's local server or in the cloud. Its products includes e-rmis, a stock control and merchandise management system. and a point of sale product that can be on a fixed till point or tablet. These systems utilise omnichannel retailing.

The company's platform supports integration with other e-commerce platforms, such as Magento.
