= NopCommerce =

nopCommerce
- Original author: Andrei Mazulnitsyn
- Developer: The nopCommerce development team
- Stable release: 5.00.1 / 2026-11-09; 2 days ago
- Written in: C#
- Operating system: Linux, macOS, Windows
- Type: Online store
- License: nopCommerce Public License Version 4.0
- Website: https://www.nopcommerce.com/
- Repository: nopCommerce Repository

nopCommerce is a source-available eCommerce platform based on Microsoft's ASP.NET Core framework and MS SQL Server 2012 (or higher) backend Database. It provides a catalog frontend and an administration tool backend, allowing shopping cart creation. It is available under the nopCommerce Public License V3 and officially launched in October 2008 for small to medium-sized businesses.

== History ==
nopСommerce development started in 2008 by Andrei Mazulnitsyn in Yaroslavl, Russia. Later on, the company moved to Yerevan, Armenia. Microsoft recognized nopCommerce as a significant service and included it with Microsoft's Web platform Installer.

The first versions introduced basic functionality such as order processing, attributes, plugins, discounts, tier pricing, news, blogs, private messages, forums, tax and shipping support. In June 2010, a new data access layer was introduced in version 1.70. Version 2.00 (August 2011) launched nopCommerce as an ASP.NET MVC based service. Later in 2011 nopCommerce moved to ASP.NET MVC 4. Versions 3.00 and 3.10 were extended to include multi-store and multi-vendor features and to simplify the product logic. In versions 3.50, 3.60, and 3.70, a modern and responsive template was included. Version 3.80 was released with a brand new and responsive admin area with basic and advanced views and with the capability to run in web farms. Version 3.90 contains significant improvements in marketing and content management functionality, performance optimization, and the admin area UI and UX. In version 4.00 nopCommerce was moved to ASP.NET Core 2.0. Starting from version 4.20, the platform provides support of UNIX-based systems, and since version 4.30 it supports MySQL. Version 4.40 has implemented asynchronous programming which supposedly improves performance significantly, support for PostgreSQL database, and Full web farm support which it previously lacked. From version 4.40, nopCommerce started supporting minor versions. In the latest version 4.80.0, nopCommerce was migrated to .NET 9. Version 4.80.0 includes significant enhancements like advanced bulk product editing, granular admin access controls, improved vendor tools, and user experience refinements across the storefront and admin panel.

The version release cycle varies and time gap between each major release has been increasing significantly. The release date for 4.80 was 11 December 2024. That makes it approximately 8 months from when 4.70 was released.

On October 20, 2025, the nopCommerce team released nopCommerce 4.90, a large collection of enterprise-grade features. These features inclulde AI-driven content, SEO tools, B2B, additional personalization, etc. nopCommerce 4.90 was highly praised by many, such as LinkedIn.

On October 27, 2026, the nopCommerce team released nopCommerce 5.00, upgrading the platform to .NET 10. The release added AI recommendation engines, a sales chatbot, and ChatGPT shopping product feeds. It also included product 3D models, General Safety and Performance Requirements (GSPR), PunchOut (cXML) support, native price list support, and other updates.

== Usage ==
As of February 2022, Builtwith.com reports that 54,139 websites have used nopCommerce. The installation package was downloaded more than 3 million times. It is used by such brands as Volvo, Puma, Reebok, DHC skincare, Columbia, Medindia, and Speedo.

== Business model ==
nopCommerce can be downloaded, installed and used free of charge. The community forum provides free support. There is an optional fee for white-labeling, premium support services, and partnership program. Until 2014, the documentation was downloaded on a paid basis and now is available free of charge.

There are paid plugins (extensions), themes, and customization services provided by the nopCommerce team and many third-party organizations. Most of the paid plugins and themes are sold in a yearly license model or a version-specific license model. In a yearly license model, the plugin or theme will get bug fixes and version upgrades for one year from the date of purchase. This means if there is a new major release for nopCommerce within the 1-year license validity period, then the plugin or theme will get an update if the organization that sold the plugin decides to upgrade the code base of the plugin or theme to support the latest release of nopCommerce. After a year, the plugin or theme can be used with the last compatible version of nopCommerce forever. But to receive any new updates, the license has to be purchased again or renewed, usually with the same original cost or a discounted renewal cost; this varies from partner to partner. In a version-specific license model, the plugins or themes will work only with a specific version of nopCommerce. This means the plugin or theme will not be compatible with any other version of nopCommerce. The plugins or themes will not receive any updates with any new release of nopCommerce. A new version-specific license has to be purchased for any future versions of nopCommerce.

While these are good monetary business models for third-party partners, there has been growing criticism around both models as the paid third-party plugins and themes do not get any updates during a one-year license validity period as the time between each major release of nopCommerce has been increasing steadily. As of February 2024, the average time between each major nopCommerce release is about 13 months and this gap is growing significantly. On top of this, additional development time for updating the plugin and themes by the respective organizations (partners) has to be factored in as well.

== Community ==
nopCommerce has an active community of users and developers, which provides assistance to other users; contributes with code, plugins and other extensions; and helps with planning the roadmap. As of February 2022, it has 140 partners in 140 countries providing custom development, graphic theme creation, and other services. As of January 2019, the stackoverflow.com has more than 1,000 questions tagged "nopCommerce". Current marketplace offers more than thousand plug-ins and themes. nopCommerce has been translated to 56 languages.

On 30 October 2015, the first conference of the nopCommerce community #NopDevDays took place in Amsterdam, Netherlands, attracting more than 65 delegates from 14 countries. nopCommerce Days was the second conference in Amsterdam in October 2016, which hosted 160 attendees from 30 countries and was a 2-day event with 19 presentations and 4 workshops. The third nopCommerce Days conference was held in November 2017 in New York, and the fourth in November 2018 in Las Vegas. In 2016 nopCommerce community started organizing webinars and meetups around the world.

== See also ==
- Comparison of shopping cart software
