= KonaKart =

- Developer: DS Data Systems UK Ltd
- Stable release: 9.6.0.0 / 31 August 2022; 3 years ago
- Written in: Java
- Operating system: Cross-platform
- Type: eCommerce, Webshop, Shopping cart
- License: partly GNU LGPL, partly proprietary but source available
- Website: www.konakart.com

KonaKart is a Java eCommerce system aimed at medium to large online retailers. The KonaKart product is owned by DS Data Systems UK Ltd with staff in Italy and the UK. DS Data Systems UK Ltd is part of the Zucchetti Group.

KonaKart includes both a Storefront application (with a Responsive Design) and an AJAX-enabled Administration Application. The Administration Application includes role-based security which allows companies to define the administrative functions that should be allowed for different user groups.

There are two versions of KonaKart:

- The Community Edition of is free and can be downloaded from the KonaKart website.
- The Enterprise Extensions Edition is chargeable and has more features that tend to appeal to larger Enterprises.

== Clients ==
KonaKart claims to have a number of notable clients worldwide including Sony, Treasury Wine Estates, Audi, Tesco, Coop, O2, Leroy Merlin, MasterCard, RAND Corporation, The Vatican, Si.mobil, Selgros, Tallink, Weleda, dm-drogerie markt, Verizon Communications Inc. and Edeka.
