= TechRadar =

Global technology news and reviews website

- Website type: Technology website
- Available in: English
- Owner: Future plc
- Editors: Marc McLaren (global editor-in-chief); Lance Ulanoff (editor-at-large)
- Website: techradar.com
- Commercial: Yes
- Launched: 2007; 19 years ago
- Current status: Active

TechRadar is an online technology publication owned by Future plc. It has editorial teams in the United States, United Kingdom, and Australia that provide news and reviews of tech products and gadgets. It was launched in 2008 and expanded to the US in January 2012. It further expanded to Australia in October 2012. It was the largest consumer technology, news and review site from the UK as of 2013.

TechRadar also has licensed versions in Italy, Spain, Germany, France, Norway, Sweden, Denmark, Finland, the Netherlands and Belgium. The Indian and Middle East versions of the site closed in October 2022. It also has two spin-off sites, TechRadar Pro and TechRadar Gaming.

TechRadar is owned by Future plc, the sixth-largest publisher in the United Kingdom. In Q4 2017, TechRadar entered the top 100 of Similarweb's US Media Publications Rankings as the 93rd biggest media site in the United States.

In 2023, TechRadar underwent a significant redesign, which the company described as a relaunch. The redesign aimed to enhance user navigation, with a shift from story-type to product category-based navigation.

== Editorial leadership ==
Marc McLaren is the global editor-in-chief and Lance Ulanoff is editor-at-large.

Previous editor-in-chiefs include Paul Douglas, Gareth Beavis, Darren Murph, Patrick Goss and Marc Chacksfield.

As of February 2025, the TechRadar masthead lists 40 staff members, not including subbrands TechRadar Pro and TechRadar Gaming.

== TechRadar Pro ==
TechRadar Pro, an arm of the main site, is a B2B-focused property with an emphasis on small business. The subbrand "acts as a complementary source of information targeted specifically at businesses and decision makers," the company says. Désiré Athow is managing editor of the subbrand and is part of a nine-person staff.

== TechRadar Gaming ==
The newest brand extension – TechRadar Gaming, or TRG – was launched 17 December 2021 and aims to "sit at the intersection of hardware and gaming, leveraging strengths of existing brands to bring the best experience to gaming audience." The company described a related hiring spree for the site as "the biggest investment in gaming in a decade." Rob Dwiar is managing editor for TRG and is part of a three-person team.
