= Apache OFBiz =

Open-source enterprise resource planning software

- Developer: Apache Software Foundation
- Stable release: 24.09.05 / 14 January 2026; 2 months ago
- Written in: Java, XML, FreeMarker, Groovy, JavaScript
- Operating system: Cross-platform
- Type: Business process
- License: Apache License 2.0
- Website: ofbiz.apache.org
- Repository: OFBiz Repository

Apache OFBiz is an open source enterprise resource planning (ERP) system. It provides business applications for areas including accounting, CRM, order management, warehousing, manufacturing, and MRP.

OFBiz is an Apache Software Foundation top level project.

== Overview ==
Apache OFBiz is a framework that provides a common data model and a set of business processes. All applications are built around a common architecture using common data, logic and process components. Beyond the framework itself, Apache OFBiz offers functionality including:

- Accounting (agreements, invoicing, vendor management, general ledger)
- Asset maintenance
- Catalogue and product management
- Facility and warehouse management system (WMS)
- Manufacturing execution / manufacturing operations management (MES/MOM)
- Order processing
- Order management system (OMS) Including multi-channel order processing, drop-shipping support, and enhanced inventory management.
- Inventory management, automated stock replenishment etc.
- Content management system (CMS)
- Human resources (HR)
- People and group management
- Project management
- Sales force automation
- Work effort management
- Electronic point of sale (ePOS)
- Electronic commerce (eCommerce)
- Scrum (development) (Scrum software development support)

== History ==
The OFBiz project was created by David E. Jones and Andrew Zeneski on April 13, 2001. The project was initially hosted as The Apache Open For Business Project on SourceForge and Open For Business Project (Apache OFBiz) at Open HUB.

Between September 2003 and May 2006, it was hosted as a java.net project, but the project has been removed from there. It has begun to be widely used around 2003. After incubating since January 31, 2006, it became a Top Level Apache project on December 20, 2006: Apache OFBiz Incubation Status.

== See also ==
- Comparison of shopping cart software
- Comparison of accounting software
- Comparison of project management software
- List of ERP software packages
