= PrestaShop =

Open source e-commerce platform

Prestashop
- Industry: Internet
- Founded: 2007; 19 years ago in Paris, France
- Founder: Bruno Lévêque, Igor Schlumberger
- Headquarters: Paris, France
- Area served: Worldwide
- Key people: Alexandre Eruimy, CEO
- Products: Webshop, Shopping cart software
- Website: prestashop-project.org

PrestaShop is a freemium, open source e-commerce platform. The software is published under the Open Software License (OSL). It is written in the PHP programming language with support for the MySQL database management system. It has a software dependency on the Symfony PHP framework.

PrestaShop is currently used by 300,000 shops worldwide and is available in 60 different languages.

== History ==
PrestaShop started in 2005 as a student project within the EPITECH IT School in Paris, France. Originally named phpOpenStore, the software was first available in two languages: English and French. Three months after its launch, the project was translated into thirteen languages.

The company, PrestaShop SA, was founded in 2007 by Igor Schlumberger and Bruno Lévêque.

Between May 2010 and April 2012, PrestaShop grew from 17 employees to more than a hundred. In 2011, it established a secondary headquarters in the United States in Miami. As of April 2016, PrestaShop has over 120 employees and offices in 6 countries.

In March 2014, PrestaShop SA secured $9.3M in Series B Funding to continue its global expansion efforts.

In January 2015, the company launched PrestaShop Cloud, a free self-hosted version of its software, but at least since 2017 is no longer available.

The 1.7.x branch of PrestaShop was first released as a stable version in November 2016.

Initially, maintenance for the 1.6 version was planned to expire in October 2018. For various reasons, PrestaShop decided to extend this maintenance period until June 30, 2019.

PrestaShop has been built as a monolith following traditional object-oriented PHP practices. Originally based on a custom framework, it is progressively being migrated to Symfony.

In February 2018, Alexandre Eruimy took over as CEO of PrestaShop. Since then, the company has been signing large-scale strategic partnerships with companies such as Paypal, Google, Meta, TikTok and many others, in order to make the latest technological solutions available to e-retailers.

In April 2019, PrestaShop reached 32% market share of all online shopping sites in France, according to BuiltWith.

PrestaShop's worldwide marketshare of sites using open-source shopping cart software was 0.31% in October 2021 according to BuiltWith. According to W3Techs's August 2023 report, 0.8% of the top 10 million websites worldwide are built using PrestaShop.

In October 2019, PrestaShop closed the Miami headquarters and ceased its operations in the Americas.

In 2019, PrestaShop received the Acteurs du Libre International Award for its international development strategy.

A beta version of PrestaShop 8 was released in August 2022 along with a migration path from PrestaShop 1.7. In October 2022, PrestaShop 8.0 was released. In June 2025 version 9.0 was released.

In November 2021, PrestaShop was taken over by the MBE Worldwide to accelerate its growth and become the leading commerce platform for accelerating business growth worldwide. MBE Worldwide later renamed itself into Fortidia.

After the takeover Prestashop was divided into an opensource software project (website prestashop-project.com) and the Prestashop Corporation. The project maintains the main software. The corporation provides a couple of extra modules that are included in the distributed software.

== Business model ==
As an open-source organization, PrestaShop is faced with the challenge of generating revenues. By leveraging the size and international scope of its open-source community, the company established two main sources of revenue:

- PrestaShop Addons, a marketplace through which merchants purchase custom addons and themes for their stores
- Strategic partnerships with e-commerce industry leaders such as PayPal or Google

== Features ==
PrestaShop has more than three hundred built-in features for managing product listing, payments, shipping, manufacturers and suppliers. PrestaShop uses a web template system that allows users to customize store themes and add new features through add-on modules. The PrestaShop Addons marketplace provides a platform for third-party developers to sell themes and modules to merchants.

=== Themes ===
PrestaShop provides a basic responsive theme by default. Users can install or develop their own themes that change the display of the website without altering its content.

=== Modules ===
Add-on modules extend the software's built-in functionalities. Users may install modules directly within the software administration panel or develop their own.

== Updating the Modules section for PrestaShop 9 ==
I noticed that the article's technical information about PrestaShop modules could benefit from an update to reflect the newer PrestaShop 9 release.

PrestaShop 9 introduces changes relevant to module developers, including updated technical requirements and compatibility considerations. These changes may require developers to review and update existing modules when migrating stores from earlier versions.

I suggest expanding the existing Modules section with a brief explanation of:

How modules specify supported PrestaShop versions. Compatibility considerations when migrating from PrestaShop 8 to PrestaShop 9. The importance of testing and updating modules when upgrading between major versions. The official PrestaShop developer documentation provides technical information about module development and compatibility. The PrestaShop help centre also recommends checking module and theme compatibility before updating a store.

Relevant documentation:

PrestaShop 9 Developer Documentation Feature Comparision of Prestashop 8 and Prestashop 9 Would other editors consider this a useful update to the article?

== Partnerships ==
On June 14, 2021, Wish announced a partnership with PrestaShop to provide over 300k merchants with access to the Wish marketplace.

In June 2023, Prestashop forms an official, co-branded partnership with marketing automation platform Klaviyo launching Prestashop Automation with Klaviyo

== See also ==
- Comparison of shopping cart software
- List of online payment service providers
