= Pimcore =

Software platform

Pimcore company
- Type: Private
- Industry: Computer software
- Founded: Austria, Salzburg 2010 (initial platform release) Pimcore GmbH incorporated 2013
- Headquarters: Salzburg, Austria
- Area served: Worldwide
- Products: Pimcore
- Website: www.pimcore.com

Pimcore software
- Stable release: 12.3.12.1 / 7 August 2026; 2 months ago
- License: Proprietary
- Repository: github.com/pimcore/pimcore

Pimcore is an enterprise PHP software platform for product information management (PIM), master data management (MDM), customer data platform (CDP), digital asset management (DAM), content management (CMS), and digital commerce.

== Technology ==
Pimcore is operated in a web browser and is based on the PHP programming language, as well as the MySQL/MariaDB database system. It consists of a modular software architecture that uses leading development frameworks, such as the Symfony project and the package management Composer based on a "best-of-breed" approach. The architecture uses the conventions of object-oriented software development, taking into account the MVC (Model View Controller) design pattern.

Pimcore follows the specifications and definitions of the PHP Framework Interop Group (PSR 1, 2, 3, 4 and 7). The company has been a member of this PHP standardisation body since August 2016.

Since its initial release in 2010, Pimcore has followed a fully API-based approach. All functionalities can be accessed by a PHP and a REST API. This allows for easy connectivity to any existing third-party systems, such as SAP, Navision, Salesforce or Oracle. The core of Pimcore is extensible through third-party components and plugins.

Pimcore has a management interface to configure the system and manage data. The administration interface, Pimcore Studio, is built on React and TypeScript. A legacy admin interface based on Sencha ExtJS remains available for backwards compatibility in some installations.

With Pimcore 11, the company introduced Pimcore Studio, a complete rearchitecture of the administration interface. Pimcore Studio became the default admin interface in Pimcore 12, replacing the legacy ExtJS-based UI.

== Functionality ==
Pimcore's portfolio consists of software solutions for multi-domain master data management and solutions for cross-channel digital commerce and content management. Pimcore is available in four editions: Community Edition (source-available, free, under POCL); Professional Edition (commercial, license-compliant, under PEL); Enterprise Edition (on-premise or private cloud, under PEL); and Enterprise PaaS (managed multi-cloud service, under PEL). The software platform includes functionalities for product information management (PIM), web content management (CMS), digital asset management (DAM) and e-commerce and is available under the proprietary POCL and the proprietary PEL (Pimcore Enterprise License).

=== Master Data Management (MDM) / Product Information Management (PIM) ===
Pimcore's MDM/PIM functionalities deal with the lifecycle of a company's master and product data. The focus is on the consolidation of data, the creation of a central data repository and data quality management topics. In this context, Pimcore enables the configuration of data models of any complexity and the consolidation of data for companies from a wide range of industries and with a wide range of business models. Pimcore includes more than 40 data components and is compatible with classification systems such as ECLASS (formerly styled as eCl@ss) and GS1. Content as well as structures, versions, descriptions, translations can be managed centrally.

=== Web Content Management (CMS) ===
CMS functionalities are based on the media-neutral management of data and the support of the single-source and multi-channel publishing principle. Pimcore can therefore be used to create and manage cross-media and cross-channel content that can be consumed on digital devices (desktop, mobile, tablet) as well as offline at POS and in print.

=== Digital Asset Management (DAM) ===
DAM functionalities include centralized management, classification and conversion of digital media in any format and size. The objective is to simplify the management of media and deliver the right media in the appropriate formats to the relevant output channels.

=== E-Commerce-Framework ===
The e-commerce framework is a component-based development framework to rapidly develop flexible B2B and B2C e-commerce applications.

=== Customer Data Framework ===
The Customer Data Framework is a component-based development framework to rapidly develop applications for customer data management, customer data segmentation, personalisation and marketing automation.

=== Pimcore Platform ===
Pimcore positions its platform as The unifying data layer for product, master & asset data. It allows to enable real agentic Product Experience Management (PXM) , an evolution of traditional PIM that combines product data management with multi-channel publishing and personalized customer experiences.

The Pimcore platform combines PIM, CMS, DAM and e-commerce in a single application, consolidating IT landscapes.

== History ==
Pimcore was originally developed by the digital agency elements at New Media Solutions GmbH. The first public beta version was released on January 21, 2010. In 2013, the company Pimcore GmbH was founded.

In 2015, Pimcore launched a global partnership program for system integrators and digital agencies. It has partners in Europe, North America, and Southeast Asia.

Pimcore follows the guidelines and definitions of the PHP Framework Interop Group (PSR 1, 2, 3, 4 and 7). The company has been a member of this PHP standardisation body since August 2016.

In 2018, Pimcore received $3.5 million in Series A funding by German Auctus Capital.

In 2022, Pimcore closed a $12M Series B Deal led by Nordwind Growth to globally expand the Enterprise Open-Source Data and Experience Management Platform.

In 2025 Pimcore abandoned their Open-Source platform for version 12 of their software and changed their license to the proprietary "POCL" license. This license, Pimcore claims, is Open Core, even though the core software is not offered as Open Source. The community reacted with a fork called OpenDXP

== Technology ==
Pimcore is a web-based application and uses the PHP programming language and the MySQL/MariaDB relational database management system. The core application is extensible through plugins, and by utilising APIs. Pimcore includes an administrative back-end interface for system configuration and managing data. It makes use of the following components:

- Symfony, a web application framework
- PHPUnit, a unit testing framework
- Twig, a templating engine
- Composer, a package manager
- Ext JS, a JavaScript single-page application framework

== Usage ==
- As of 2025, Pimcore reports being used by over 118,000 companies in 75 countries and is supported by a network of more than 170 solution partners.
- Northgate Markets, developed an end-to-end ordering system an overhauled its website with Pimcore
- Alshaya, a Kuwait-based international franchise operator, implemented a PIM and DAM to manage data for 1.8 million products
- Open Icecat added an open source plugin to upload the open content database to a Pimcore instance
- Audi developed a B2B Shop that ensured brand consistency in the dealer network
