= EWay =

Payment provider

Eway
- Type: Public
- Industry: Payment Gateway
- Founded: 1998; 28 years ago
- Founder: Matt Bullock
- Headquarters: Australia
- Area served: Australia; New Zealand; Singapore; Hong Kong; Macau
- Key people: Mark Reid, Managing Director
- Services: online payments provider | shopping cart payment gateway integration | online payments processing platform.
- Website: eway.io

Eway is a global omnichannel payment provider. The company processes secure credit card payments for merchants. Eway works through eCommerce.

== History ==
eWAY was founded in 1998 by Matt Bullock, and the website was launched in 2000. By 2004, eWAY was linked to all major Australian banks, and, in 2009, the company expanded by a further 65%. In 2009, eWAY partnered with all the major New Zealand banks, expanding payment services in the region. In 2014, eWAY expanded into Singapore, Hong Kong and Malaysia.

Along with its regional expansions, eWAY has partnered with major SaaS companies to provide integrated payment services. In 2013, eWAY partnered with Xero to produce the 'Pay Now' add-on for Xero online invoices. In 2013, eWAY was awarded Xero Add-on Partner of the Year for the 'Pay Now' add-on. eWAY has also built the Xero PayThis feature. Similar ventures have followed with the eWAY's integration with NetSuite. eWAY expanded its partnership with Magento. In 2015, eWAY strengthened its partnership with Shopify, integrating its Rapid 3.1 API on the eCommerce's platform.

=== Timeline ===
In December 2013, eWAY partnered with the National Australia Bank to launch eWAY Merchant Services in Australia. In July 2015, eWAY expanded into physical payments with the launch of SmartPOS. The mobile card reader integrates with Xero, Salesforce, and Shopify, and supports contactless payments and EFTPOS payments. The SmartPOS device links to iOS, Android and Apple Watch apps. In September 2015, eWAY launched an app. In October 2015, eWAY partnered with Kikka Capital, a Perth-based small business lender. In November 2015, eWAY became the first Australian payment gateway to offer a mobile integration with Apple Pay. In April 2016, eWAY was purchased by Global Payments.

== Awards ==
- Xero Add-on Partner of the Year 2013.
- National iAward for Research and Development (Merit) 2013.
- ACT Chief Minister’s Export Award 2011.
- ACT Pearcey Entrepreneur Award 2011.
- ORIA Industry Recognition Award 2010.
- CeBIT.AU Award for Excellence in Engineering Design 2009.
- Telstra ACT Business of the Year Awards 2008.
