= Open Software License =

Software license

- Author: Lawrence Rosen
- Latest version: 3.0
- Publisher: 2002, Lawrence Rosen
- SPDX identifier: OSL-1.0, OSL-1.1, OSL-2.0, OSL-2.1, OSL-3.0
- FSF approved: Yes
- OSI approved: Yes
- GPL compatible: No
- Copyleft: Yes
- Website: opensource.org/licenses/OSL-3.0

The Open Software License (OSL) is a software license created by Lawrence Rosen. The Open Source Initiative (OSI) has certified it as an open-source license, but the Debian project judged version 1.1 to be incompatible with the DFSG. The OSL is a copyleft license, with a termination clause triggered by filing a lawsuit alleging patent infringement.

Many people in the free software and open-source community feel that software patents are harmful to software, and are particularly harmful to open-source software. The OSL attempts to counteract that by creating a pool of software which a user can use if that user does not harm it by attacking it with a patent lawsuit.

== Key features ==
=== Patent action termination clause ===
The OSL has a termination clause intended to dissuade users from filing patent infringement lawsuits:

10) Termination for Patent Action. This License shall terminate automatically and You may no longer exercise any of the rights granted to You by this License as of the date You commence an action, including a cross-claim or counterclaim, against Licensor or any licensee alleging that the Original Work infringes a patent. This termination provision shall not apply for an action alleging patent infringement by combinations of the Original Work with other software or hardware.

=== Warranty of provenance ===
Another goal of the OSL is to warrant provenance.

7) Warranty of Provenance and Disclaimer of Warranty. Licensor warrants that the copyright in and to the Original Work and the patent rights granted herein by Licensor are owned by the Licensor or are sublicensed to You under the terms of this License with the permission of the contributor(s) of those copyrights and patent rights.

=== Network deployment is distribution ===
OSL explicitly states that its provisions cover derivative works even when they are distributed only through online applications:

5) External Deployment. The term "External Deployment" means the use, distribution, or communication of the Original Work or Derivative Works in any way such that the Original Work or Derivative Works may be used by anyone other than You, whether those works are distributed or communicated to those persons or made available as an application intended for use over a network. As an express condition for the grants of license hereunder, You must treat any External Deployment by You of the Original Work or a Derivative Work as a distribution under section 1(c).

=== Linking does not create a derivative work ===
OSL in section 1(a) authorizes licensees to reproduce covered software "as part of a collective work," as distinct from the Original Work or a Derivative Work. In section 1(c), only Derivate Works or copies of the Original Work are made subject to the license, not collective works. Derivative Work is defined in section 1(b) as being created when the licensee exercise their ability "to translate, adapt, alter, transform, modify, or arrange the Original Work."

Rosen has written:

The verbs used in § 1(b) ["translate, adapt, alter, transform, modify, or arrange"] reflect the kinds of activities that we generally do to create derivative literary or other expressive works, and those things—not functional linking—create Derivative Works as defined in this license. As a result, linking an unchanged Original Work with another independently-written work does not, absent more, create a Derivative Work subject to § 1(b); such an act is merely the incorporation of a copy of that Original Work into a collective work, authorized by § 1(a).

== Comparison with the LGPL and GPL ==
The OSL is intended to be similar to the LGPL. Note that the definition of Derivative Works in the OSL does not cover linking to OSL software/libraries so software that merely links to OSL software is not subject to the OSL license.

The OSL is not compatible with the GPL. It has been claimed that the OSL is intended to be legally stronger than the GPL (with the main difference "making the software available for use over the Internet requires making the source code available" that is the same goal as the even newer GNU Affero General Public License (AGPL), that is compatible with GPLv3), however, unlike the GPL, the OSL has never been tested in court and is not widely used.

=== Assent to license ===
The restriction contained in Section 9 of the OSL reads:

If You distribute or communicate copies of the Original Work or a Derivative Work, You must make a reasonable effort under the circumstances to obtain the express assent of recipients to the terms of this License.

In its analysis of the OSL the Free Software Foundation claims that "this requirement means that distributing OSL software on ordinary FTP sites, sending patches to ordinary mailing lists, or storing the software in an ordinary version control system, can arguably be a violation of the license and would subject violators to possible termination of the license. Thus, the OSL makes it challenging to develop software using the ordinary tools of Free Software development."

Rosen contradicts this, stating in an explanation of his license that "most open source projects and commercial distributors already use appropriate procedures to obtain the manifest assent of their licensees, so this OSL 3.0 requirement is not intended to require something different than what now happens in ordinary software distribution practice."

=== Distribution ===
If the FSF claim is true then the main difference between the GPL and OSL concerns possible restrictions on redistribution. Both licenses impose a kind of reciprocity condition requiring authors of extensions to the software to license those extensions with the respective license of the original work.

=== Patent action termination clause ===
The patent action termination clause, described above, is a further significant difference between the OSL and GPL.

== Further provisions ==
- Derivative Works must be distributed under the same license. (§1c)
- Covered works that are distributed must be accompanied by the source code, or access to it made available. (§3)
- No restrictions on charging money for programs covered by the license, but source code must be included or made available for a reasonable fee. (§3)
- Covered works that are distributed must include a verbatim copy of the license. (§16)
- Distribution implies (but does not explicitly state) a royalty-free license for any patents embodied in the software. (§2)

== Later versions ==
It is optional, though common for the copyright holder to add “or any later version” to the distribution terms in order to allow distribution under future versions of the license. This term is not directly mentioned in the OSL. However, it would seem to violate section 16, which requires a verbatim copy of the license.

== Open software that uses the OSL ==
- ClearCanvas (sold), Enterprise-ready DICOM Viewer and RIS/PACS
- Magento, an eCommerce web application
- PrestaShop, an eCommerce web application
- Mulgara, a triplestore written in Java (new code is being contributed using the Apache 2.0 license.)
- The Graphical Models Toolkit (GMTK), a dynamic Bayesian network prototyping system
- Akeneo PIM (software), a Product Information Management application

== Open software that used the OSL ==
- NUnitLite up to 2.0 Alpha, a lightweight version of NUnit, NUnitLite is available under MIT / X / Expat Licence
- CodeIgniter v3.0, an open source PHP framework (planned to use OSL, dropped because of GPL incompatibility for MIT License, may have used only for a short time for development release)

== See also ==
- Academic Free License – similar, but not reciprocal license by the same author
- Open source license
- Software using the Open Software License (category)
