= SupaDupa =

- Developer(s): SupaDupa
- Operating system: Cross-platform
- Type: E-commerce
- License: Software as a service
- Website: SupaDupa.me

SupaDupa is an online store builder which allows users to create e-commerce stores, originally targeting the creative sector. It was initially launched in 2012, developed by what was originally a web development agency based in Notting Hill, London.

== History ==
The company’s founders include Guy Schragger and Adeyemi Adeleye whom had the intention of democratising e-commerce making it possible for anyone to build a professional looking and powerful store without needing any technical knowledge. The team has since expanded to 8 employees and now serves over 19,000 registered shops worldwide.

In 2013, SupaDupa entered the Cisco Big Awards, reaching the finals of the competition aimed at discovering the best use of technology in business. Also in 2013, SupaDupa won a Smarta award, voted one of Britain's best small businesses.

== Present day ==
SupaDupa are frequently a part of creative and industry events, holding webinars and workshops to support growing businesses in collaboration with EnterpriseNation, CraftCentral, GeneralAssembly and ArtsThread among others.

SupaDupa’s features including the ability to use a custom domain name, to customise a store theme by using deliberately simple design controls, or modify the HTML/CSS, predictive shop product search and discount coupon codes. The platform hosts over 19,000 stores for a wide range of creative entrepreneurs including LogLike, TheBrimLabel, Andrea Iyamah and Yellow Owl Workshop.
