= B2B e-commerce =

Sale of goods or services between businesses via an online sales portal

B2B e-commerce, short for business-to-business electronic commerce, refers to the sale of goods or services between businesses (B2B) using an online sales platform. It helps improve the efficiency and effectiveness of a company's sales and purchasing operations. Instead of handling orders manually through sales representatives, telephone, or e-mail, companies now process orders digitally, which helps reduce administrative and operational costs.

== Market development and trends ==
Manufacturing companies obtain components or raw materials from other companies and then sell to a wholesaler, distributor, or retail customer. For example, an automobile manufacturer makes several B2B transactions such as buying tires, glass for windscreens, and rubber hoses for its vehicles.

The B2B e-commerce market has been growing rapidly. In 2014, 63% of industrial supplies buyers made their purchases online. The US market was projected to grow from $780 billion in 2015 to $1.1 trillion by 2020, but recent data suggests that it is even larger. In 2022, just over 10% of B2B product sales, totaling $1.676 trillion, were made through e-commerce websites. This growth trend is expected to continue strongly until at least 2026.

In the United States, B2B e-commerce was expected to reach $1.8 trillion by 2023. This growth is being driven by a number of factors, including the increasing adoption of cloud computing, the growth of mobile commerce, and the rising demand for end-to-end supply chain solutions.

The European Union's Enterprise policy aims to "enhance trust and confidence" in B2B electronic markets. The European Commission commented on the "relatively low use of B2B e-markets" in 2004, especially among small and medium sized businesses (SMEs), which it thought might be "explained by the fact that buyers seem to benefit more from B2B e-markets than sellers", leading SMEs to suspect the market power of their larger business customers. Reverse online auctions were thought to pose particular difficulties for SMEs in this respect, and more transparent legal safeguards against unfair commercial practices were put forward as one aspect of the Commission's proposed enhancement actions.

== See also ==
- E-commerce
- Types of e-commerce
- Online marketplace
