= Types of e-commerce =

There are many types of e-commerce models, based on market segmentation, that can be used to conduct business online. The 6 types of business models that can be used in e-commerce include: Business-to-Consumer (B2C), Consumer-to-Business (C2B), Business-to-Business (B2B), Consumer-to-Consumer (C2C), Business-to-Administration (B2A), and Consumer-to-Administration

== Business-to-business (B2B) ==
B2B e-commerce refers to the sale of goods or services between businesses via an online sales portal. While sometimes the buyer is the end user, often the buyer resells to the consumer. This type of e-commerce typically applies to the relationship between producers and wholesalers; it may additionally remain applied to the relationship between the producers or the wholesalers and the retailers themselves. However, the same relationship can also occur between service providers and business organizations. B2B typically requires more venture capital and a longer sales cycle, but results in higher order value and more recurring purchases.

The advantages of B2B e-commerce include:

- Convenience: While companies can sell through physical storefronts or take transactions by phone, B2B commerce often takes place online, where companies advertise their products and services, allow for demonstrations and make it easy to place bulk orders. Sellers also benefit from efficient order processing thanks to this digital transaction model.
- Higher profits: B2B companies often sell their items in wholesale quantities, allowing buyers to receive a good deal and restock less often. Larger order numbers lead to higher potential sales and additional profits for B2B sellers. At the same time, the ease of advertising to other businesses through B2B websites can help cut marketing costs and boost conversion rates.
- Huge market potential: From business software and consulting services to bulk materials and specialized machinery, B2B sellers can target a large market of companies across industries. At the same time, they have the flexibility of specializing in an area like technology to become a leader in the field.
- Improved security: Since contracts are a common part of B2B commerce, there's some security for both buyers and sellers in that there's less concern that one will pay and the other will deliver goods as promised. Since sales usually get tracked digitally, it's also more secure in that B2B sellers can track and monitor their financial results.

The disadvantages of B2B e-commerce include:

- More complex setup process: Getting started as a B2B retailer takes work to figure out how to get customers who stay dedicated and make large-enough orders. This often requires thorough research to advertise to potential businesses, set up a custom ordering system and adapt quickly when sales are underwhelming;
- Limits to sales: While B2B companies can sell a lot, they do miss out on potential sales to individual customers. The smaller pool of business buyers and the need to negotiate contracts can put some limits on profits, especially when the company loses key buyers to other competitors;
- Need for B2B sellers to stand out: At the same time, the B2B market has many companies competing and selling similar products and services. Sellers often need to cut prices and find special ways to grab companies' attention to succeed in the market;
- Special ordering experience needed: B2B companies selling online need to put much effort into designing a website and ordering system that buyers find easy to use. This means presenting product and service information clearly, offering online demos or consultations and using order forms with appropriate options for quantities and any special customization needed.
- Complex payment process: B2B online payment solutions are both time-consuming and expensive for both parties. The buyer has to be credit checked, they'll often negotiate payment terms and trade discounts and the business will manually have to create a custom invoice.

== Business-to-consumer ==
Business-to-consumer (B2C), or direct-to-consumer, is the most common e-commerce model. It deals in electronic business relationships between businesses both producers and service providers with end consumers. Many people like this method of e-commerce as it allows them to shop around for the best prices, read customer reviews, and often find different products that they would not otherwise be exposed to in the physical retail world. This e-commerce category also enables businesses to develop a more personalized relationship with their customers.

Anything one buys online as a consumer is done as part of a B2C transaction. The decision-making process for a B2C purchase is much shorter than a business-to-business (B2B) purchase, especially for items that have a lower value, thus having a shorter sales cycle. B2C businesses therefore typically spend less marketing dollars to make a sale but also have a lower average order value and less recurring orders than their B2B counterparts. B2C innovators have leveraged technology like mobile apps, native advertising and re-marketing to market directly to their customers and make their lives easier in the process.

The advantages of B2C e-commerce include:

- Unlimited marketplace: The marketplace is unlimited, enabling the customers to explore and shop at their convenience. We can check on the desired product from home, offices and anywhere else without any time restrictions. Products can be purchased from around the world. It represents the breaking of international barriers, giving people the opportunity to purchase products virtually;
- Lower costs of doing business: B2C has reduced several business components including employees, purchasing cost, mailing confirmations, phone calls, data entry and the requirement for opening stores with physical existence. This has reduced transaction costs for customers;
- Business administration made easier: It has made it easier to record store inventory, shipment, logs and overall business transactions compared with traditional methods of business administration. These calculations are now occurring automatically. Moreover, real-time updates can be provided, through which any issues can be flagged;
- More efficient business relationships: Building new and improved associations with the dealers and suppliers;
- Workflow automation: This process enables the shipping of products in a timely manner. Furthermore, it automatically adjusts stock levels and figures out location availability. It includes highly reliable security systems, with step by step verification, account entry and admiration mode to look after business transactions. The third-party direct sales are backed up with familiar banking and accounting features that enable businesses to reach out to vendors and perform internal business transactions accordingly.

The disadvantages of B2C e-commerce include:

- Infrastructure: Even though the internet enables reaching a huge, international pool of customers, many still do not have access to the internet;
- Competition: Competition is severe. There are certain companies that have managed to maintain sizeable market shares giving them a chance to survive in the long run. New and improved products must be rolled out consistently to secure customers;
- Limited product exposure: Despite rewarding the customers with ease-of-access and a unique level of flexibility for choosing products, e-commerce has restricted product exposure for buyers over the internet. Most websites would not allow customers to go beyond the glamorous product images and their descriptions at the time of purchasing the product. It gives consumers the idea that e-commerce supports 'limited product exposure', which is why some products disappoint customers at the time of shipment and are sent back to companies immediately.

== Consumer-to-business (C2B) ==
Consumer-to-business (C2B) e-commerce is when a consumer makes their services or products available for companies to purchase.

The competitive edge of the C2B e-commerce model is in its pricing for goods and services. This approach includes reverse auctions, in which customers name the price for a product or service they wish to buy. Another form of C2B occurs when a consumer provides a business with a fee-based opportunity to market the business's products on the consumer's blog.

The C2B model has flourished in the internet age because of ready access to consumers who are "plugged in" to brands. Where the business relationship was once strictly one-directional, with companies pushing services and goods to consumers, the new bi-directional network has allowed consumers to become their own businesses. Reductions in the cost of technologies such as video cameras, high-quality printers, and Web development services give consumers access to tools for promotion and communication that were once limited to large companies. As a result, both consumers and businesses can benefit from the C2B model.

== Consumer to consumer (C2C) ==
Consumer-to-consumer (C2C), or customer-to-customer, represents a market environment where one customer purchases goods from another customer using a third-party business or platform to facilitate the transaction.

In this case, the third-party platform typically earns their money by charging transaction or listing fees. These businesses benefit from self-propelled growth by motivated buyers and sellers, but face a key challenge in quality control and technology maintenance. Another customers' benefit is the competition for products. Customers may often find items that are difficult to locate elsewhere. Also, margins can be higher than traditional pricing methods for sellers as there are minimal costs due to the absence of retailers or wholesalers.

== Business to administration (B2A) ==
Business-to-administration (B2A), also known as business-to-government (B2G), refers to all transactions between companies and public administrations or government agencies. Government agencies use central websites to trade and exchange information with various business organizations. This is an area that involves many services, particularly in areas such as social security, employment, and legal documents.

Businesses that are accustomed to interacting with other businesses or directly with consumers often encounter unexpected hurdles when working with government agencies. Layers of regulation can harm the overall efficiency of the contracting process, and thus, governments tend to take more time than private companies to approve and begin work on a given project.

While businesses may find that government contracts involve additional paperwork, time, and vetting, there are advantages to providing goods and services to the public sector. Government contracts are often large and more stable than analogous private-sector work. A company with a history of successful government contracting usually finds it easier to get the next contract.

== Consumer-to-administration (C2A) ==
Consumer-to-administration (C2A) e-commerce encompasses all electronic transactions between individuals and public administration. The C2A e-commerce model helps the consumer post their queries and request information regarding the public sector directly from their local governments/authorities. It provides an easy way to establish communication between the consumers and the government.

Examples of C2A include taxes (filing tax returns), health (scheduling an appointment using an online service), and paying tuition for higher education.

== See also ==
- Comparison of shopping cart software
- E-commerce
- Mobile commerce
