= Zen Cart =

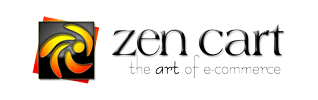
- The Art of Ecommerce

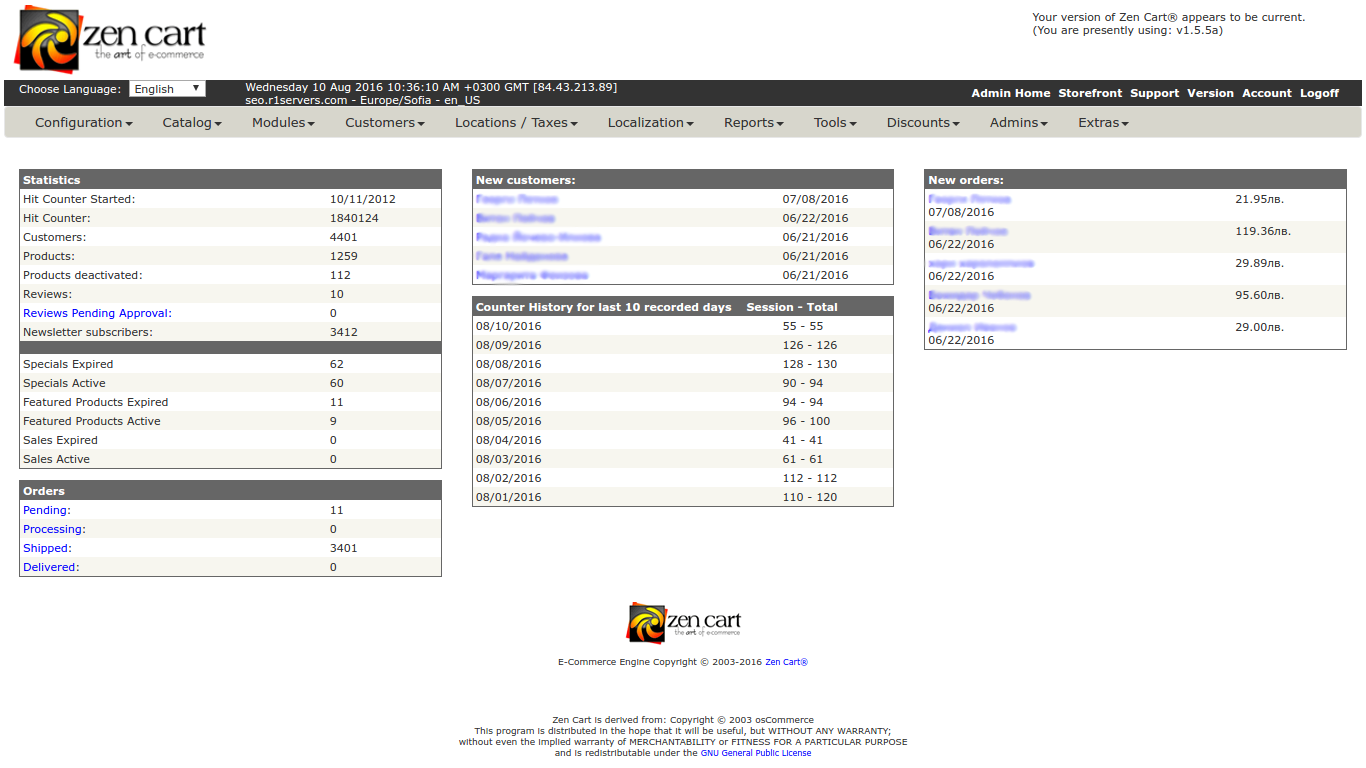
- Zencart Admin Panel screenshot. (Version 1.5.5a)
- Original author(s): Zen Ventures, LLC
- Developer(s): The Zen Cart Development Team
- Stable release: 2.0.1 / 2024-05-19[±]
- Repository: github.com/zencart/zc-v1-series
- Operating system: Cross-platform
- Type: Online store management system
- License: GNU General Public License
- Website: www.zen-cart.com

Zen Cart is an online store management system. It is PHP-based, using a MySQL database and HTML components. Support is provided for numerous languages and currencies, and it is freely available under the GNU General Public License.

== History ==
Zen Cart is a software fork that branched from osCommerce in 2003. Beyond some aesthetic changes, the major differences between the two systems come from Zen Cart's architectural changes (for example, a template system) and additional included features in the core. The release of the 1.3.x series further differentiated Zen Cart by moving the template system from its historic tables-based layout approach to one that is largely CSS-based.

== Plugins ==
As support for Zen Cart dropped in recent years, many third party companies are creating Zencart plugins and modules that can help users solve problems like installing reCAPTCHA v3

== See also ==
- Comparison of shopping cart software
