= Commerce.com =

E-commerce company

Commerce.com Inc.
- Type: Public
- Traded as: Nasdaq: CMRC
- Industry: eCommerce
- Founded: 2009; 17 years ago
- Founder: Eddie Machaalani; Mitchell Harper
- Headquarters: Austin, Texas, US
- Key people: Travis Hess (CEO); Daniel Lentz (CFO)
- Products: E-commerce software
- Revenue: $342.3 million (2025)
- Number of employees: 1,079 (2025)
- Website: www.commerce.com

Commerce.com Inc. is a NASDAQ-listed ecommerce platform that provides software as a service services to retailers. The company's platform includes online store creation, search engine optimization, hosting, and marketing and security from small to Enterprise sized businesses.

== History ==
BigCommerce was founded in Sydney, Australia in 2009 by Australians Eddie Machaalani and Mitchell Harper, who met in an online chatroom in 2003. One year after meeting, Machaalani and Harper launched their first company, Interspire, which evolved into BigCommerce. The company opened its first United States office in Austin, Texas in 2009.

The company raised $15 million in Series A funding from General Catalyst in July 2011.

In 2014, the company expanded its presence on the West Coast, opening a San Francisco office and hiring personnel from PayPal and Amazon. In 2015, BigCommerce acquired Zing, a checkout and inventory software startup.

Brent Bellm, the former HomeAway COO who led HomeAway through its IPO, replaced Machaalani and Harper as CEO in 2015.

BigCommerce partnered with Amazon in 2016 to provide its retailers with the capability to sync inventory across both channels.

In 2019, the company opened its ecommerce platforms to legally-operating U.S.-based CBD and hemp merchants.

In July 2020, BigCommerce filed for IPO. The company went public on August 5, 2020.

In October 2024, Travis Hess replaced Brent Bellm as BigCommerce CEO.

In 2025, the company launched its new parent brand, Commerce. The rebranded entity includes BigCommerce, Feedonomics and Makeswift, and operates under Commerce.com.

== See also ==
- Comparison of shopping cart software
