= Magento =

Open-source e-commerce platform

- Developers: Magento, Inc.
- Release: March 31, 2008; 18 years ago
- Stable release: 2.4.9 / 2026-05-12[±]
- Written in: PHP
- Type: Content management system, shopping cart software
- License: OSL v3, AFL v3
- Website: magento-opensource.com
- Repository: magento.com/tech-resources/download

Magento is an open-source e-commerce platform written in PHP. Magento source code is distributed under the Open Software License. Magento was acquired by Adobe Inc in May 2018 for $1.68 billion.

More than 150,000 online stores have been created on the platform. The platform code has been downloaded more than 2.5 million times, and $155 billion worth of goods were sold through Magento-based systems in 2019. As of April 2021, Magento holds a 2.32% market share in global e-commerce platforms.

Roy Rubin, the former CEO of Varien, sold a share of the company to eBay, which eventually completely acquired and then sold the company to Permira in 2015; Permira later sold it to Adobe.

== History ==
Magento began development in early 2007. It was originally developed by Varien Inc., a U.S.-based private company headquartered in Culver City, California, with 99% of contributions and developers from Ukraine. The first public beta version was released on August 31, 2007.

Varien had previously worked with osCommerce and initially considered forking it, but ultimately chose to create Magento from scratch. The first general-availability release of Magento was published on March 31, 2008.

In its early years, Magento won several awards, including the Best of Open Source Software Awards and the SourceForge Community Choice Awards.

In February 2011, eBay announced that it had acquired a 49% stake in Magento in 2010. On June 6, 2011, eBay revealed it would acquire the remaining shares and integrate Magento into its X. Commerce initiative. Magento co-founder Roy Rubin stated the platform would continue operating from Los Angeles under his and Yoav Kutner's leadership.

Yoav Kutner left Magento in April 2012, stating that changes in leadership had shifted the company's original vision post-acquisition.

Following the eBay–PayPal split driven by activist investor Carl Icahn, Magento was spun off and sold to Permira, a private equity firm, on November 3, 2015.

In May 2018, Adobe Inc. announced it would acquire Magento for $1.68 billion to integrate the platform into Adobe Experience Cloud. The acquisition was finalized on June 19, 2018.

== Overview ==
Magento employs the MySQL or MariaDB relational database management system, the PHP programming language, and elements of the Zend Framework. It uses multiple other PHP frameworks such as Laminas (formerly known as Zend Framework) and Symfony. It applies the conventions of object-oriented programming and model–view–controller (MVC) architecture. Magento also uses the entity–attribute–value model to store data and as of version 2.4 it requires Elasticsearch for its catalog search capability. On top of that, Magento 2 introduced the model–view–viewmodel (MVVM) pattern to its front-end code using the JavaScript library Knockout.js.

=== Magento Open Source ===
Magento Open Source, previously Magento Community Edition, is an open-source e-commerce platform. Developers can implement the core files and extend their functionality by adding new plug-in modules provided by other developers.

As of 2017, both the latest release and each of the historical releases of the version 1.x and 2.x branches of Magento Open Source were available on the Magento Commerce, Inc. website for download. Development of the version 2 branch of Magento Open Source is coordinated publicly on GitHub.

Adobe announced after its acquisition that Magento would remain open source. Magento 1.9.4, the last version of the Magento 1.x branch, reached end-of-life on June 30, 2020.

==== Magento 2 ====
Magento 2 was announced in 2010 with an initial release planned for 2011. However, delays postponed its rollout, and a merchant beta version was eventually made available in July 2015.

The stable release of Magento 2 occurred on November 17, 2015. It introduced a re-architected codebase with improved performance, scalability, and modernized development tools. For a period, Magento 1 and Magento 2 were maintained concurrently to support merchant migration.

Key enhancements introduced in Magento 2 include:

- Full-page server-side caching using Apache Varnish integration
- Support for PHP 7+, improving performance and reducing memory usage
- Reduced database locking and improved scalability
- Structured data support using Rich Snippets for SEO optimization
- New modular codebase and directory structure for easier customization
- CSS preprocessing with LESS and URL resolution improvements
- Built-in JavaScript bundling and minimization for front-end performance
- Enhanced browser caching of static assets
- Improved coding standards and developer workflows

==== OpenMage ====
OpenMage is a fork of Magento 1.x (version 1.9.4.5) maintained by the community on GitHub to offer long-term support and continued bug fixes for Magento 1.x installations.

=== Adobe Commerce ===
Adobe Commerce is an e-commerce platform as a service released on April 11, 2016. It initially launched as Magento Commerce. In April 2021, Magento Commerce was rebranded to Adobe Commerce, as part of a long-term project to integrate Magento within the Adobe Experience Cloud business unit.

Adobe Commerce is available in an on-premises version and as a service hosted by Adobe in the cloud. The hosted version launched as Magento Enterprise Cloud Edition and later became Adobe Commerce Managed Services.

Adobe Commerce On-Premise is derived from Magento Open Source and designed for large businesses. It shares the same core files as Magento Open Source but is not freely licensed and has additional proprietary features and functionality. It was originally called Magento Enterprise Edition, and later Magento Commerce (On-Premises), before rebranding to Adobe Commerce On-Premise. The latest actively supported version of Magento Commerce is 2.3.4 (EE and CE) released on October 8, 2019.

Since 2026, Adobe has designated MariaDB as the default and recommended database platform for Adobe Commerce going forward, with Adobe Commerce 2.4.8 and 2.4.9 being the last releases to support MySQL.

There were also two former platforms, Magento Professional Edition, and Magento Go.

=== Latest Adobe Commerce Version Release Notes ===
Find All Latest Release Notes and important information related to specific releases of all Adobe Commerce products

Adobe Commerce 2.4.9 release notes

Adobe Commerce 2.4.8 release notes

Adobe Commerce 2.4.7 release notes

Adobe Commerce 2.4.6 release notes

Adobe Commerce 2.4.5 release notes

Adobe Commerce 2.4.4 release notes

Adobe Commerce 2.4.3 release notes

Adobe Commerce 2.4.2 release notes

Adobe Commerce 2.4.1 release notes

Adobe Commerce 2.4.0 release notes

=== Magento Partners ===
==== Solution Partners ====
Magento Solution Partners are certified agencies that specialize in delivering eCommerce solutions on the Magento platform (now Adobe Commerce). These partners have demonstrated expertise in implementing, customizing, and maintaining Magento-based websites for merchants across B2B, B2C, and D2C channels.

Many Solution Partners also develop proprietary extensions, integrations, and performance enhancements that extend the capabilities of the core platform. Adobe maintains a directory of certified partners to help merchants identify implementation experts with proven success in Magento Commerce projects.

==== Technology Partners ====
Magento Technology Partners—now Adobe Commerce Technology Partners—are third-party companies that provide integrated products and services to extend the capabilities of Adobe Commerce stores. These partners support key areas such as marketing automation, payments, content management, shipping, taxation, hosting, performance optimization, and more.

== Security concerns ==
In 2015, it was reported that outdated or unpatched Magento web stores were susceptible to a cross-site scripting attack, which allowed attackers to perform online skimming to steal user credit card information. According to a security expert, more than 4000 Magento web stores were vulnerable to such an attack in October 2016.

In 2017, security company DefenseCode reported that Magento CE web stores were susceptible to a remote code execution attack, which allowed attackers to perform web skimming, steal stored credit card information of future and previous customers, take control of the database, and in some instances even the complete server - including other Magento instances. It's suspected that up to 260,000 Magento web stores could be vulnerable to such an attack in April 2017.

In 2019, Magento reported a potential vulnerability in its administration URL location for its 2.1.x, 2.2.x, and 2.3.x versions. It also reported a critical security breach for customers running version 1.0.2 (and earlier versions) of the Magestore Store Locator extension. Similar incidences of a Magecart attack and Magento killer have also been faced by e-commerce store owners.

In the following years, Adobe has continued to release regular security updates for Adobe Commerce and Magento Open Source to address critical vulnerabilities. These updates have included fixes for privilege escalation, arbitrary file system access, cross-site scripting (XSS), and other high-severity issues. Notable examples include security bulletins APSB25-71 (August 2025), APSB25-50 (April 2025), and earlier releases, which addressed multiple vulnerabilities that could potentially allow attackers to bypass security features, read sensitive files, or disrupt store functionality if left unpatched.

== Events ==
"Imagine eCommerce" is the annual Magento eCommerce conference that has run since 2011. The first event was held in February 2011 in Los Angeles with more than 600 Magento merchants, partners, and developers. The goals of the event are sharing e-commerce ideas and providing networking opportunity sessions.

Besides Imagine, Magento also organizes local "Magento Live" events in which the participants will have opportunities to learn more about e-commerce in general, get introduced to local Magento partners, and learn about upcoming changes to the Magento software itself. Magento Live events have been held in Australia (Sydney), UK (London), The Netherlands (Amsterdam), Spain (Barcelona), France (Paris) and Germany (München).

There is a non-profit organization that was established in 2019 and that contributes up to more than 24 global "Meet Magento" events per year named "Magento Association" The association is open to all companies who are active in e-commerce in any way and want using Magento commerce now or in future. The project has been run on all developed markets of Magento like Germany, Austria, Switzerland, France, Sweden, Denmark, Italy, Spain, the Netherlands, Poland, Ukraine, Romania, India and also Vietnam.

== Certification ==
There are four different Magento certifications: three of them aim to prove developers' competency in implementing modules; one (Certified Solution Specialist) targets business users (consultants, analysts, project managers). Magento Front End Developer Certification is mainly focused on improving the user interface (UI) of back-end developers who implement the core modules. The Plus certification tests a deep understanding of Magento Enterprise modules and the entire architecture.

== Resources ==
The docker-magento project allows Magento development environments to be easily set up. It works for both new and existing Magento instances, and has been maintained and supported by M.academy since September 20, 2015.

Magento Open Source 2.0.0 was released on November 17, 2015, and the latest version 2.4.8-p4 was released on March 10, 2026.

In early 2020, Adobe added the Magefan Login as Customer extension to the 2.4.0 core functionality

Magento 1 migration to Magento 2 can be done by the official Data Migration Tool. The migration can be performed by developers with extensive Magento 1 and 2 experience.

Official Adobe Commerce release notes are available.

== Criticism and controversy ==
In 2011, a TechCrunch article reported that according to its sources, former Magento employees claim they have been collectively "cheated out" of nearly 7–10% of Magento, a stake that would have been worth approximately $18 million when eBay acquired the company earlier that year.

== See also ==
- Comparison of shopping cart software
- List of online payment service providers
