= Card scheme =

Payment networks linked to payment cards

Card schemes are payment networks linked to payment cards, such as debit or credit cards, of which a bank or any other eligible financial institution can become a member. By becoming a member of the scheme, the member then gets the possibility to issue cards or acquire merchants operating on the network of that card scheme. UnionPay, Visa and MasterCard are three of the largest global brands, known as card schemes, or card brands. Billions of transactions go through their cards on a yearly basis.

== Types ==
The card schemes come in two main varieties - a three-party scheme (or closed scheme) or a four-party scheme (or open scheme).

=== Three-party scheme ===
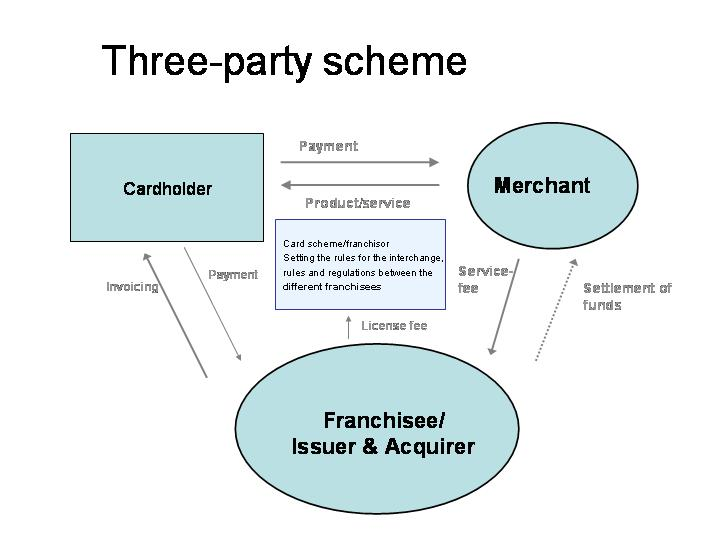

A three-party scheme consists of three main parties, as described in the adjacent diagram.

In this model, the issuer (having the relationship with the cardholder) and the acquirer (having the relationship with the merchant) are the same entity. This means that there is no need for any charges between the issuer and the acquirer. Since it is a franchise setup, there is only one franchisee in each market, which is the incentive in this model. There is no competition within the brand; rather, you compete with other brands.

Examples of this setup are Diners Club, Discover Card, and American Express, although in recent times these schemes have also partnered with other issuers and acquirers in order to boost their circulation and acceptance, and Diners Club now operates as a four-party scheme in many regions.

=== Four-party scheme ===
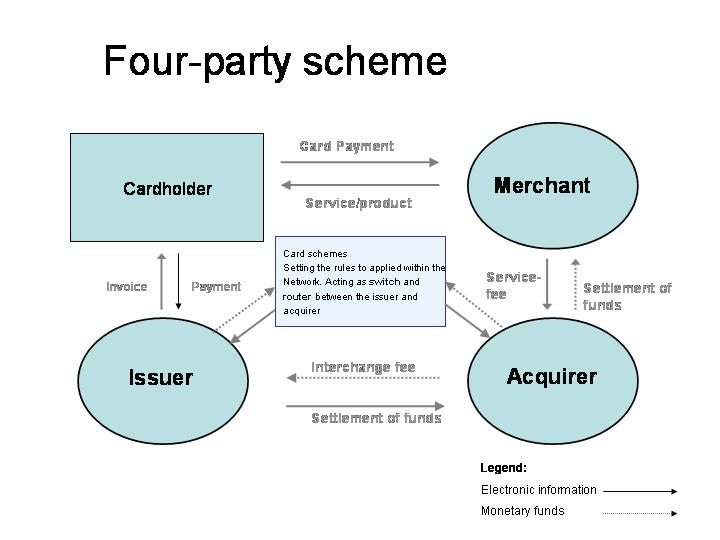

In a four-party scheme (also referred to as Four Corners Model), the issuer and acquirer are different entities, and this type of scheme is open for other institutions to join and issue their own cards. This is the type of card scheme used by brands such as Visa, Mastercard, Verve Card, UnionPay and RuPay. There are no limitations as to who may join the scheme, as long as the requirements of the scheme are met.

== Processes ==
The card scheme uses the respective guidelines to process the card exchange data from the acquiring to the issuing bank, and vice versa, until the payment is fully completed (or denied). Credit and debit cards work with a four-party scheme, completing an open-circle framework that permits consistent flow of transactions; thus, allowing the banks to handle the whole process.

Card schemes aim to make the transaction convenient and automated for all parties involved in the loop, with the core belief that clients end up spending more than intended when the payment process is simple.

== Key parties ==
=== Cardholder ===
A cardholder is a consumer, who owns the debit or credit card, issued by their bank, or other financial institution. They aren't legally obliged to use a single card scheme and may own various types of cards, issued by numerous institutions.

=== Card issuer ===
The card issuer, as the name implies, issues credit, debit, and prepaid cards from any of the available card schemes to all clients who went through a screening process and are, therefore, qualified to own a bank account. Card issuers can be not only banks but any other certified financial institution.

=== Acquiring bank ===
The acquiring bank (also known as obtaining bank), is the organization that provides administration consent to the merchant and validates their transaction process.

=== Merchant ===
Any business, or individual, that receives payment based on the product or service, which they offer.

=== Payment processor ===
The payment processing company imparts and transfers data for a client's credit or debit card to both the issuing and acquiring bank. The processor likewise checks for security issues, ensuring that the client's card information is right, and all data is entered correctly. Also, the same party deals with incorrect or accidental charges.

=== Payment gateway ===
A payment gateway is a key party, responsible for online transactions, passing card data from consumer to merchant, and to a relevant bank through the card scheme. The process usually takes place at POS terminals in retail locations, or by means of online payment services for websites. A payment gateway imparts whether the charge has been processed by the cardholder's bank and moves it further for settlement.

== Fees ==
Card scheme fees are the expenses that are paid by acquiring banks, which, on the other hand, charge merchants through transaction fees. Card scheme fees are not openly uncovered, and no outside parties knows the genuine figure.

Those fees might incorporate quite a few charges, some of which are - fixed or transaction fees, unrelated to the individual payment. Factors, such as the card type, payment method, and geographic area might influence the variable fees.

=== Interchange fees ===
Interchange fees (or trade fees) are transaction charges that the acquiring bank pays when a payment is being processed via debit or credit card. The expenses are paid to the issuing bank and cover costs, such as processing fees, bad debt, and charges due to risk and potential fraudulent activities.
