= TransNational Payments =

- Company type: Private company
- Industry: Financial services
- Founded: 1999; 27 years ago
- Founder: John Pitzaferro
- Headquarters: Rosemont, Illinois, United States
- Area served: United States
- Key people: John Pitzaferro, Jae Haas, Bryan Olson, Mark London
- Products: Mobile payments, Payment gateways, Credit and debit card processing, Gift card and loyalty programs, ACH payments
- Services: Merchant Services, Payment Processing, Credit Card Processing
- Number of employees: 125 (2017)
- Website: gotnpayments.com

TransNational Payments is a private payment service provider headquartered in Rosemont, Illinois, United States. TransNational provides credit card processing and electronic payment solutions for small to medium-sized businesses and organisations across a variety of industries.

== History ==
The company was founded in 1999 as TransNational Bankcard, Inc. by John Pitzaferro. The company later changed its name to TransNational Payments, Inc. Pitzaferro said he had the idea to create the company after spending 16 years working in merchant services where he witnessed the lack of transparency in the industry. His aim was to bridge the gap between payment processors and their customers. This included using full-disclosure communication, encouraging employees, and giving to charitable causes.

In 2009, Pitzaferro founded My Well Ministry, a service that provides payment processing support to churches, nonprofits and philanthropies at cost. The following year, he launched another initiative, called Party with a Purpose, an annual fundraiser co-sponsored by TransNational Payments and the ORPHANetwork to benefit vulnerable children in Nicaragua. Since its inaugural year in 2011, the event draws hundreds of attendees every October and has delivered nearly $1.2 million in donations designated to provide 1,200 children in the community of Nueva Vida, Nicaragua with food, medical care and education.

In 2014, the company partnered with Vision96, an IT consulting service company. It operates in the field of telecommunications, unified communications, data & wide area network services, cloud & DCS and internet services.

In September 30, 2021–Nearly one year after its acquisition, Celero Commerce announced the full integration and rebrand of TransNational Payments.

== Products ==
TransNational Payments supports ACH payments, credit card and debit card processing, gift card and loyalty programs, mobile payments, online payments, payment gateways, virtual terminals and point of sale systems.

In March 2018, TransNational Payments unveiled a payment gateway API, called Pi APi. The solution was designed to simplify EMV integration for web developers by using more agile software architecture, including JSON-based design and cloud-based infrastructure.

== Customer range ==
Due to the variety of available equipment and services, Transnational Payments works with merchants in a number of industries, including auto dealership, auto repair, business-to-business (B2B), education, entertainment and recreation, field services, fitness and spa, heating, ventilation and air conditioning (HVAC), insurance, medical, organizations and nonprofits, plumbing, professional services, religious organizations, restaurants and bars, retail, salons and beauty, veterinary and wholesale.
