= Finaro =

Payment processing company

Credorax Bank Limited
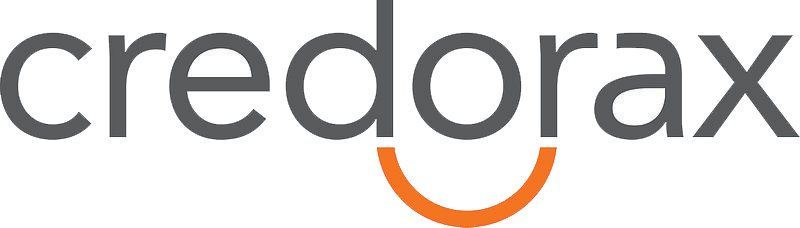
- Company type: Private
- Traded as: Finaro
- Industry: Financial services
- Founded: 2007; 19 years ago
- Headquarters: Herzliya, Israel
- Key people: Benny Nachman (Founder & former CEO); Igal Rotem (CEO since 2016); Moshe Selfin (CTO & COO)
- Products: Acquiring Technology, Banking Technology, Payment Technology, Processing Services, Information Based services
- Website: www.credorax.com finaro.com shift4.com

Finaro (the trading name of Credorax, Inc.), is an Israel-based online merchant acquiring bank and payment service provider (PSP). Established in 2007 by Benny Nachman, Michael Fainshtein and Eugene Volkov the company operates in the European Union, United States, and China.

In October 2023 Finaro was acquired by Shift4 and now operates under the Shift4 brand name.

== History ==
Credorax was founded as a financial technology startup in 2007, in Southborough Massachusetts by Benny Nachman. From its start, the company launched and developed as an online acquiring bank acting as an intermediary between issuing banks or payment service providers and e-commerce merchants. The initial funding was provided by Blumberg Capital. By 2014, the company received nearly $130 million in venture funding from Blumberg Capital, FTV capital and other investment firms.

In 2010, the company was licensed to operate under the EU Payment Services Directive (PSD). In 2014, it obtained commercial banking license in Japan and in 2015, the company received a commercial banking license in Malta allowing it to operate within the European Union. Processing a volume of over $4.3 Billion in 2019.

In March 2022, Finaro announced its acquisition by US payments company Shift4 in a deal valued at US$575 million. The deal took some time to get approved by the required institutions, after which the acquisition was completed on October 26, 2023. On November 13, 2023, Finaro announced that it was rebranding as Shift4 and was operating under the Shift4 brand name from that day onwards.

== Services ==
In technological terms, Finaro is both an acquiring merchant bank and a payment processing provider (PSP), via its payment gateway technology, Source, which facilitates multi-channel payment processing, fraud and risk management services. According to a Nilson Report, in 2019 Credorax introduced bank account facilities for its clients.
