= Chargeback insurance =

Chargeback insurance is an insurance product that protects a merchant who accepts credit cards. The insurance protects the merchant against fraud in a transaction where the use of the credit card was unauthorized, and covers claims arising out of the merchant's liability to the service bank.

The phrase chargeback insurance is also sometimes used to describe the guarantee provided by online fraud prevention companies such as Vesta, ClearSale, Forter, Riskified and Signifyd. Unlike with card present transactions, where the merchant is not liable for the cost of fraudulent transactions (unless they do not meet technological security requirements such as EMV), merchants are liable for card not present transactions which turn out to be fraudulent. For this reason, online fraud prevention companies who offer decisions (meaning, they provide an approve or decline decision for orders) rather than scores (where the merchant must themselves decide whether to approve or decline) sometimes offer to cover the cost of the chargeback, since the chargeback would not have occurred had their decision not been incorrect. This form of chargeback insurance, more properly called a chargeback guarantee, will typically cover all losses of the relevant type, not only through one gateway or processor.

== Coverage model ==
Coverage can apply under a number of circumstances, including:

- The illicit use of a lost or stolen credit card before the loss or theft is reported by the cardholder.
- The use of credit card number generators or counterfeit plastic cards
- Post-purchase changes to "ship to" information
- Signature mismatch or signature not on file.

A merchant claiming under a chargeback insurance policy may be reimbursed for:

- The cost of a stolen product or service
- The loss of profit

A typical chargeback insurance policy will only cover losses on credit card transactions purchased through its own specific payment processor or payment gateway.

While chargeback insurance can help cover losses, like any insurance there are pros and cons. While some fraud protection services charge a flat-rate fee per transaction (typically 0.5 to 15 cents per transaction), vendors who offer chargeback insurance usually charge a percentage-based fee of 0.5% to 1.5% which can be cost-prohibitive for higher-dollar transactions.

== See also ==
- Cardholder Information Security Program (CISP)
- Chargeback
- Payment card industry (PCI)
