= WiPay =

Caribbean payment technology company

WiPay Holdings Group
- Company type: Private
- Industry: Financial services; Payment processor
- Founded: 2016; 10 years ago
- Founder: Aldwyn Wayne Jr.
- Headquarters: Trinidad and Tobago
- Area served: Trinidad Barbados Saint Lucia Jamaica Guyana
- Services: Payments; Billing; Connect; Issuing; Terminal
- Website: wipaycaribbean.com

WiPay is a Caribbean-based payment technology company that specializes in electronic payments for businesses.

WiPay was founded in 2016 by Aldwyn Wayne Jr., a Trinidadian businessman and graduate of Georgia Tech Institute.

In September 2019, WiPay partnered with MasterCard. As a result, WiPay became the only licensed Payment Facilitator (PAYFAC) on both the MasterCard and Visa networks in the region.

== See also ==
- Electronic commerce
- List of online payment service providers
- Payment gateway
- Payment service provider
