= Dispute (payment card) =

After a payment card settles a transaction process, a dispute is a formal demand from a payer's card issuer, usually at the cardholder's request, for the transaction's acquirer to partially or fully reimburse the transaction's debit amount. The obligation for the acquirer to comply, as well as the entitlement of an issuer to raise a dispute, is limited to circumstances stipulated by the card association which facilitated the transaction and/or financial law.

Issuers may raise disputes for a variety of reasons, including unauthorized charges, excessive charges, failure by the merchant to deliver merchandise, defective merchandise, dissatisfaction with the product(s) or service(s) received, or billing errors. The return of money to a payer of a transaction is called a chargeback.

In the United States, in the event of fraud, the cardholder is liable for a maximum of $50 worth of fraudulent charges. Many card issuers will waive this fee.
