= Verifi =

American payment protection and management company

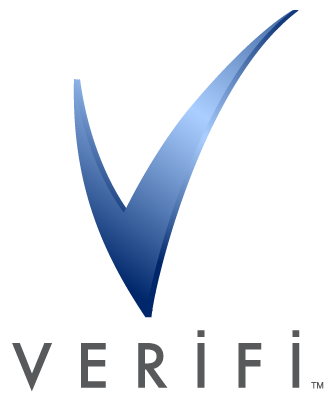
- Company type: Online Payment, International Money Transfer and Prepaid Debit Cards
- Founded: 2005
- Headquarters: Los Angeles, CA, United States
- Key people: Matthew Katz, CEO
- Website: www.verifi.com

Verifi, Inc. is an American financial technology company that provides dispute management and chargeback prevention tools for card-not-present payments. Founded in 2005 and headquartered in Los Angeles, California, Verifi offers products including Order Insight, Rapid Dispute Resolution (RDR), and the Cardholder Dispute Resolution Network (CDRN) to help merchants, issuers, and acquirers resolve transaction inquiries at the pre-dispute stage and reduce chargebacks. Verifi was acquired by Visa International Service Association in 2019 and operates as a Visa company.

== History ==
Verifi was founded in 2005 in Los Angeles to address growing e-commerce fraud and post-purchase disputes by creating real-time collaboration between merchants and issuing banks.

== Acquisition by Visa ==
Verifi was acquired by Visa on September 12, 2019. Visa has since highlighted Verifi’s products - Order Insight and RDR - as part of its post-purchase solution set for merchants and issuers.

== Services and products ==
Verifi provides post-purchase solutions designed to prevent, deflect, or automatically resolve disputes before they become chargebacks:

- Order Insight (PREVENT) - a data-sharing service (originally related to Visa’s VMPI program) that lets issuers access merchant CRM and order details in real time at the point of cardholder inquiry, reducing confusion and deflecting first-party misuse (“friendly fraud”). Visa also promotes Order Insight within its post-purchase solutions for merchants.
- Rapid Dispute Resolution (RDR) (RESOLVE) - an auto-decisioning tool that enables rules-based, real-time refunds to cardholders at the pre-dispute stage, instantly resolving certain Visa disputes to avoid chargebacks and lower operational costs.
- Cardholder Dispute Resolution Network (CDRN) - a network that alerts merchants when a cardholder initiates a dispute at the issuer, giving merchants a short window (e.g., ~72 hours) to credit the cardholder and prevent a formal chargeback (supports Visa and non-Visa transactions).

== See also ==
- Visa Inc.
- Chargeback
- Payment gateway
- E-commerce
