= IXOPAY =

Payment system

- Type: GmbH private company
- Founded: 2014; 12 years ago
- Headquarters: Vienna, Austria
- Products: Merchant payment orchestration platform, payment service provider
- Number of employees: 100 (2023)
- Website: www.ixopay.com

IXOPAY is an Austrian fintech company and payment service provider that acts as a payment orchestration platform. Ixopay allows merchants to integrate many payment providers using a single API. The company has nearly 100 employees with offices in Vienna, Austria and in Florida, United States.

== History ==
Ixopay was founded in 2014 in Vienna by Rene Siegl and Nathalie Siegl.

In 2016, the first payment orchestration platform was launched, while in 2018, it released a white label solution and as of 2022 became one of the key players in payment orchestration industry globally. According to Bloomberg, the company cooperates with over 200 other financial and technological companies and had, as of 2021, 140 integrations with payment providers.

In 2018, Ixopay partnered with Paysafe. In 2020, the company partnered with Paydoo. In 2021, Ixopay started a partnership with Vyne, Fraudio, Payaut, and Fraugster.

According to a study in 2023, Ixopay's enterprise merchants technology is the most used and trusted among blockchain technologies on the European continent. Ixopay is a payment orchestration platform for white label clients and enterprise merchants.
