= CV-2 =

CV-2 may refer to:

- USS Lexington (CV-2), a U.S. Navy aircraft carrier that served after World War I and during World War II, until she was sunk in the Battle of the Coral Sea.
- de Havilland Canada DHC-4 Caribou, a specialized cargo aircraft with short takeoff and landing (STOL) capability.
- Castlevania II: Simon's Quest, a 1987 action-adventure game produced by Konami
- Card Verification Value (CV2), a security feature for credit or debit card transactions
- Capability Taxonomy, a type of Capability View in the Department of Defense Architecture Framework

See also

- Citroën 2CV
