= Dispute =

Dispute may refer to:

- an act of physical violence; combat
- Controversy
  - Lawsuit
  - Dispute resolution
- Dispute (credit card)
- The endless dispute, a question of arthropod morphology

== See also ==
- La Dispute (disambiguation)
