= Headage payments =

Under the EU Common Agricultural Policy, subsidies known as headage payments are paid to producers based on the number of head of a specific type of livestock. Such payments may be contingent upon participation in a supply control program (e.g., limiting the number of livestock on a farm).
