= Merchant service =

Merchant service may refer to:

- An alternative term for merchant navy
- Merchant services, a category of financial services relating to business
