= Shift4 =

American payment processing company

Shift4 Payments, Inc.
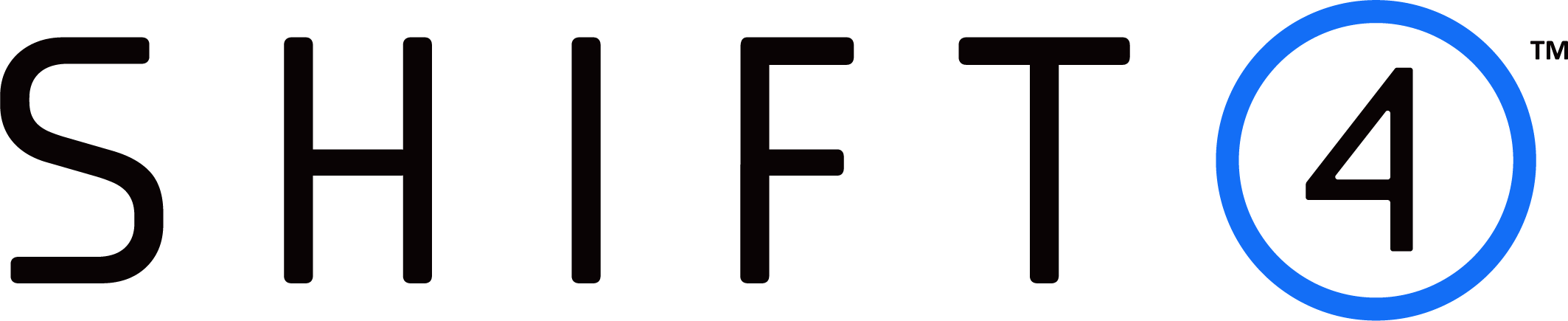
- Type: Public
- Traded as: NYSE: FOUR (Class A); S&P 400 component
- Industry: Financial services
- Founded: 1999; 27 years ago (as United Bank Card)
- Founder: Jared Isaacman
- Headquarters: Center Valley, Pennsylvania, U.S.
- Area served: Canada; Europe; United Kingdom; United States
- Key people: Taylor Lauber (CEO)
- Revenue: ▲US$4.18 billion (2025)
- Net income: ▼US$119 million (2025)
- Total assets: ▲US$8.71 billion (2025)
- Total equity: ▲US$1.44 billion (2025)
- Number of employees: ~4,000 (2024)
- Website: shift4.com
- Footnotes; Financials as of December 31, 2024. References

Shift4 Payments, Inc. is an American payment processing company based in Allentown, Pennsylvania. The company, founded in 1999 by the then 16-year-old Jared Isaacman, processes payments for over 200,000 businesses in the retail, hospitality, leisure, and restaurant industries. Shift4 specializes in commerce technology such as mobile payment software and hardware. The company was publicly listed on the New York Stock Exchange in 2020.

== History ==
While working as an employee of a payment processing company, the 16-year-old Isaacman (who had already earned his GED and gone to work full-time) identified what he saw as inefficiencies in the industry. In response, he launched United Bank Card in his parents' basement in Far Hills, New Jersey. At the time, it generally took merchants about one month to set up a payment system and merchants had to pay for their credit card readers and sign a lengthy application. As an alternative, Isaacman's new company cut the set-up time to one day, gave merchants free credit card readers and only required merchants sign a two-page application.

In 2012, United Bank Card rebranded as Harbortouch to better reflect its point-of-sale and payment technology.

Between 2014 and 2017, the company expanded by acquiring multiple payment processing and point-of-sale companies, including Merchant Services Inc. (the same company Isaacman worked for as a teen).

The company rebranded once again in 2017 as Lighthouse Network, with Harbortouch becoming a subsidiary.

In 2017, the company - then operating as the Lighthouse Network - acquired payment gateway provider Shift4 Corporation and rebranded itself as Shift4 Payments.

In 1994, Shift4 Corporation was founded in Irvine, California, by J. David Oder, Katherine A. Oder, J.D. Oder II, Kevin J. Cronic, and Steven M. Sommers. The company moved its headquarters to Las Vegas, Nevada, in 1995 and developed early payment gateway and security technologies. In 2005, it commercially launched TrueTokenization®, one of the first production tokenization systems for payment card data. Shift4 Corporation held multiple U.S. patents related to secure payment transactions and tokenization. In December 2017, Lighthouse Network acquired Shift4 Corporation and subsequently adopted the Shift4 name for the combined company.

Shift4 went public on the NYSE in June 2020, raising $345 million through its IPO. The company is one of the few companies to go public in the months after the start of the COVID-19 pandemic. The company completed its "roadshow" for investors entirely online. The company was the first to ring the bell at the New York Stock Exchange after the trading floor was reopened following its shutdown because of the pandemic.

In November 2020, Shift4 announced the acquisition of 3dcart, an E-commerce platform. In January 2021, Shift4 rebranded it as Shift4Shop.

In March 2021, the company announced the acquisition of VenueNext, a provider of point-of-sale and payment products for stadiums, arena, and other entertainment venues. A year later, the company announced it acquired Finaro.

In February 2025, Shift4 announced the acquisition of Global Blue for $1.5 billion.

In March 2025, Isaacman announced his intention to resign as CEO upon his confirmation as administrator of NASA, following his nomination by Donald Trump the previous January.

In June 2025, Shift4 acquired Smartpay, Smartpay, a New Zealand-based credit card processing company with active operations in Australia and New Zealand, for $180 million.

== Services ==
The company's business model involves integrating payment processing services into various hardware and software products as well as the gathering of business intelligence.

It works primarily in the restaurant, hospitality, retail and e-commerce industries. Shift4 also offers cloud-based reporting and analytics software. In 2019, the company processed approximately 3.5 billion transactions.
