= Zentoshin =

Japanese payment provider company

- Native name: 株式会社全東信
- Romanized name: kabushiki gaisha Zentōshin
- Industry: Payment processor
- Founded: 1987; 39 years ago in Osaka, Japan
- Website: zentoshin.com

Zentoshin (Note: Japanese: 株式会社全東信, Hepburn: kabushiki gaisha Zentōshin) is a defunct Japanese payment processor. The company was founded in Osaka in 1987. In 2024, allegations were made that Zentoshin falsified its financial records. The company filed for bankruptcy two years later on July 6, 2026, after the allegations prevented it from raising financing. At the time of filing, the company served around 200,000 merchants and had ¥115.2 billion in liabilities.
