= Shift4Shop =

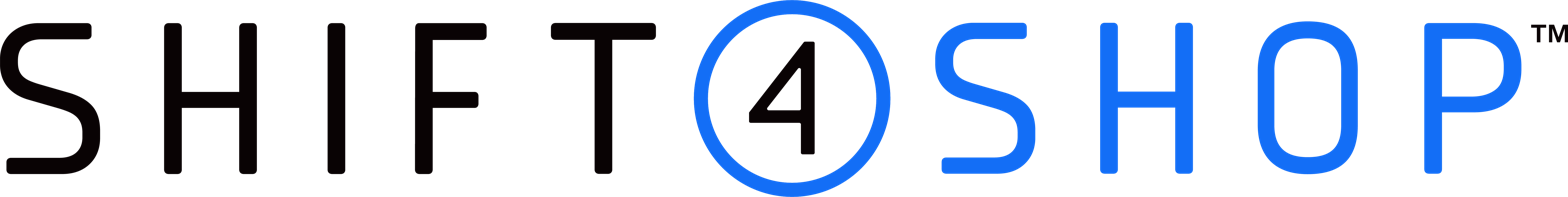
- Industry: E-Commerce
- Founded: 1997
- Headquarters: Tamarac, FL
- Products: Hosted Shopping Cart
- Parent: Shift4 Payments
- Website: www.shift4shop.com

Shift4Shop (formerly 3dcart) is a technology company that develops e-commerce software for businesses. The company was founded in 1997 with headquarters in Tamarac, FL. Shift4Shop develops electronic commerce application for online stores and retail point-of-sale systems.

== History ==
3dcart was founded by developer and architect Gonzalo Gil as Infomart 2000, and development started in Tamarac, Florida in 1997. 3dcart was released to the public in 2001. 3dcart platform was created to maximize opportunities for retailers, and manufacturers. 3dcart was 100% bootstrapped, until Jan 2010, when it closed $1.25 million in funding. It saw major growth, when it was announced as the preferred ecommerce solutions for fulfillment by Amazon. In March 2017, the company announced partnership with Square Inc. to integrate and accept credit card payments through its platform. In July 2020, 3dcart partners with Smartarget to integrate messaging apps, such as WhatsApp and Facebook Messenger.

In November 2020, Shift4 Payments acquired 3dcart and renamed the entity Shift4Shop.

== Product ==
Shift4Shop is a cloud-based e-commerce application to create an online retail store, utilizing Microsoft .NET 4.5 and other technologies, including AngularJS, Elasticsearch, Lucene and Entity Framework 6. The Shift4Shop e-commerce platform has a user interface that features administrative e-commerce tools, which clients can use to manage their online stores. It APIs for storefront as well as multiple shipping and payment interfaces, such as FedEx, UPS and USPS. 3dcart integrates 2checkout, Stripe, Solidcommerce, api2cart and other providers in its payment system.

== Business Model ==
Shift4Shop is offered as a SaaS model with monthly subscription fees. The company offers a trial, different subscription plans and charge additional fees for premium services.

== Reception ==
PCMag describes the platform as "clean, simple, and easy-to-use." The service was profiled in several publications including Ecommerce Platforms, GetApp, and Gazette Review.

== See also ==
- Open Source Software
- Electronic commerce
- Shopping cart software
