= La Dispute =

La Dispute may refer to:

- La Dispute (play), a 1744 French prose comedy
- La Dispute (band), an American post-hardcore band

== See also ==
- Dispute (disambiguation)
