= Payment orchestration =

Process to combine digital payment service providers

Payment orchestration is the process of managing and optimizing digital payments by integrating multiple payment service providers, gateways, and methods into a single platform.

== Overview ==
Payment orchestration is an advanced framework that enables businesses to streamline and optimize their payment processing by integrating multiple payment methods and service providers into a single platform. Payment orchestration is distinct from a payment gateway or payment optimization. A gateway is narrower in scope, as it provides a means of access to payment processing, and is not a system to tailor and optimize payment flows for specific merchants or payment service providers. Payment optimization involves techniques to improve the outcome of an individual transaction. Orchestration is the entire "payments stack".

Components of payment orchestration include the use of a platform for processing; integration with payment service providers; built-in fraud prevention and security; and the means for customization according to business requirements.

== Payment Orchestration Platform ==
A Payment Orchestration Platform (POP) is the core of the payment orchestration process, functioning as a centralized system that integrates various payment methods and service providers. This platform allows merchants, payment service providers (PSPs), and acquirers to manage and customize their payment flows to meet specific business needs. The POP leverages advanced technologies such as data analytics and machine learning to intelligently route transactions to the most efficient provider, thus improving transaction approval rates and minimizing chargebacks.

Some enterprise-scale merchants have their own proprietary POPs in-house. To reduce the amount of time spent by developers on payment processing, others prefer to contract with a third-party POP vendor.

=== Modular and Scalable Architecture ===
The architecture of payment orchestration platforms is typically modular and scalable, designed to accommodate multiple clearing and settlement mechanisms (CSMs). This flexibility allows organizations to choose specific services they require, making it easier to adapt to changes in payment methods or regulations. The platform also features robust APIs that enable deep integration with existing systems, such as e-commerce platforms and customer relationship management tools.

=== User Experience and Workflow Customization ===
With POPs, businesses can configure workflows to handle various payment scenarios, such as retries for failed transactions, refunds, and chargebacks. Payment orchestration platforms may also use cascading or fallback logic, in which a transaction that is declined or cannot be processed by one payment service provider is automatically routed to an alternative processor. This customization of routing rules allows for improved performance and reduced costs while minimizing declined transactions.

== Payment Service Provider Integration ==
Payment orchestration facilitates integration with multiple PSPs through open application programming interfaces. This connectivity enables a network capable of handling diverse payment scenarios, facilitating a seamless transaction flow and flexibility needed by high growth or enterprise-size merchants. By utilizing multiple PSPs, businesses can automatically route transactions to alternative processors in case of issues, thereby maintaining continuity in payment processing and improving authorization rates by up to 15%.

== Fraud Prevention and Security Measures ==
An important part of payment orchestration is built-in fraud prevention. Platforms often include tools for detecting suspicious activity and monitoring transactions in real-time. Regular updates to security settings help protect against emerging threats, thus ensuring secure transactions through encryption and tokenization.
