= Signifyd =

- Type: Private
- Industry: Software
- Founded: 2011; 15 years ago in Palo Alto, California, United States
- Founders: Raj Ramanand; Mike Liberty
- Headquarters: San Jose, California
- Area served: Worldwide
- Products: Commerce Protection Platform
- Services: Fraud prevention software Chargeback protection Payments optimization Abuse prevention
- Website: signifyd.com

Signifyd is an American technology company that develops fraud protection and abuse prevention technology. It is based in San Jose, California.

== History ==
Signifyd was founded in 2011 by Raj Ramanand and Mike Liberty, former PayPal risk specialists. In late 2012, the company raised $2 million in seed funding from investors including Andreessen Horowitz, Data Collective, IA Ventures, QED Investors, and Resolute Ventures.

In 2013, Signifyd received the Merchant Risk Council's "Most Innovative Startup" award. It later raised several funding rounds, including $7 million in Series A and $20 million Series B funding in 2016. A year later, in 2017, it raised $56 million in Series C funding led by Bain Capital Ventures. In 2018, Signifyd raised $100 million in Series D funding and in the same year it opened its first European office in Barcelona. In 2019, the company opened an office in Belfast as part of its European expansion.

In April 2021, Signifyd reached a valuation of $1.34 billion after a $205 million Series E round led by Owl Rock Capital, with participation from FIS and CPP Investments.

== Operations ==
Signifyd is headquartered in San Jose, California with additional offices in the United States, Europe, and Latin America. In late 2019, Signifyd opened its first international research and development center in Belfast, Northern Ireland, to support product development in Europe.

== Technology ==
Signifyd develops a software-as-a-service commerce protection platform that uses machine learning and big data analytics to automate fraud screening, and reduce chargebacks.

A core feature of the platform is a "ship-or-don't-ship" decision backed by a financial guarantee against fraud and consumer abuse. Over time, the platform expanded beyond chargeback protection to include abuse prevention and payment optimization, including tools aimed at return fraud, policy abuse, and related forms of e-commerce abuse.
