= Agent-assisted automation =

Type of call center technology

Agent-assisted automation is a type of call center technology that automates elements of what call center agents do with their desktop tools and say to customers during calls using pre-recorded audio. It is a relatively new category of call center technology that shows promise in improving call center productivity and compliance.

== Types of agent-assisted automation ==
=== Pre-recorded audio ===
Pre-recorded audio (often employed through a soundboard) is a form of agent-assisted automation. Pre-recorded messages are used to make sure that the right information is provided to customers at the right time. The required disclosures are pre-recorded to ensure accuracy and clarity. By integrating the recordings with customer relationship management software, the right combination of disclosures can be played based on the combination of goods and services the customer purchased. Integration with customer relationship management software also ensures that the order cannot be submitted until the disclosures are played, ensuring that customers receive all the required consumer protection information.

Phone surveys are ideal applications of this technology. Pre-recorded audio allows survey questions to be asked in the same way every time, uninfluenced by the agents' fatigue levels, accents, or personal views.

=== Fraud prevention ===
Fraud prevention is a specialized type of agent-assisted automation focused on reducing ID theft and credit card fraud. ID theft and credit card fraud are huge threats for call centers and their customers and few good solutions exist, but new agent-assisted automation solutions are producing promising results. The technology allows the agents to remain on the phone while the customers use their phone key pads to enter the information. The tones are masked and the information passes directly into the customer relationship management system or payment gateway in the case of credit card transactions. The automation essentially makes it impossible for call center agents and also call center personnel that might be monitoring the calls to steal the credit card number, social security number, or other personally identifiable information.

=== Outbound telemarketing ===
Outbound telemarketing is a specialized application space of agent-assisted automation. It includes outbound prospecting, cold calling, solicitation, or fund-raising. Turnover is high among agents engaged in this kind of work because the task is tedious and emotionally difficult. It is tedious because the agent spends the bulk of their day reaching wrong numbers and answering machines, rather than talking to qualified leads.

== Benefits ==
Just as automation has benefited manufacturing by reducing the mental and physical effort required of workers while simultaneously improving throughput, quality, and safety, agent-assisted automation is improving call center results while reducing the tiring aspects of the job for agents.

In some cases, the agent-assisted automation streamlines the process and allows calls to be handled more quickly. By eliminating cutting and pasting from one application to another, by auto-navigating applications, and by providing a single view of the customer, agent-assisted automation can reduce call handle time and increase agent productivity.

Second, in theory, the more steps that can be automated and the more logic that can be built into the call flow (e.g., if the customer buys items 2 and 9, then disclosures a, c, and f are read by the pre-recorded audio), then companies may be able to reduce the amount of training that is required of the agents while at the same time ensuring more consistency and accuracy. However, no published studies have reported this result yet.

But an even larger problem in call centers is between-agent variation in behavior and results. Agents differ in the amount of training and coaching they receive, they differ in the amount of experience they have, their jobs are repetitious and tiring, and the process and procedures the agents are supposed to follow constantly change. Moreover, there are significant individual differences between agents in their intelligence, personality, motivations, etc. which all affect performance. Despite the large amount of money call centers have spent over decades trying to reduce between-agent variation, the problem is still so prevalent that one large study of customer interactions with call centers found that a customer's experience was completely a function of the quality of the agent who happened to answer the phone.

Therefore, the most significant benefit of agent-assisted automation may prove to be in how the automation error-proofs or poka-yoke the process and ensures that something that needs to be done or said happens every time. Properly implemented, the between-agent variation for whatever step of the process the automation is applied to may be able to be reduced to near zero. This is especially important in a collection agency whose processes and procedures are closely regulated by the Fair Debt Collection Practices Act.
