= Point-to-point encryption =

Type of encryption standard

Point-to-point encryption (P2PE) is a standard established by the PCI Security Standards Council. Payment solutions that offer similar encryption but do not meet the P2PE standard are referred to as end-to-end encryption (E2EE) solutions. The objective of P2PE and E2EE is to provide a payment security solution that instantaneously converts confidential payment card (credit and debit card) data and information into indecipherable code at the time the card is swiped, in order to prevent hacking and fraud. It is designed to maximize the security of payment card transactions in an increasingly complex regulatory environment.

== The standard ==
The P2PE Standard defines the requirements that a "solution" must meet in order to be accepted as a PCI-validated P2PE solution. A "solution" is a complete set of hardware, software, gateway, decryption, device handling, etc. Only "solutions" can be validated; individual pieces of hardware such as card readers cannot be validated. It is also a common mistake to refer to P2PE validated solutions as "certified"; there is no such certification.

The determination of whether or not a solution meets the P2PE standard is the responsibility of a P2PE Qualified Security Assessor (P2PE-QSA). P2PE-QSA companies are independent third-party companies who employ assessors that have met the PCI Security Standards Council's requirements for education and experience, and have passed the requisite exam. The PCI Security Standards Council does not validate solutions.

== How it works ==
As a payment card is swiped through a card reading device, referred to as a point of interaction (POI) device, at the merchant location or point of sale, the device immediately encrypts the card information. A device that is part of a PCI-validated P2PE solution uses an algorithmic calculation to encrypt the confidential payment card data. From the POI, the encrypted, indecipherable codes are sent to the payment gateway or processor for decryption. The keys for encryption and decryption are never available to the merchant, making card data entirely invisible to the retailer. Once the encrypted codes are within the secure data zone of the payment processor, the codes are decrypted to the original card numbers and then passed to the issuing bank for authorization. The bank either approves or rejects the transaction, depending upon the card holder's payment account status. The merchant is then notified if the payment is accepted or rejected to complete the process along with a token that the merchant can store. This token is a unique number reference to the original transaction that the merchant can use should they ever be needed to perform research or refund the customer without ever knowing the customer's card information (tokenization). There are also Qualified Integrator and Reseller (QIR) Companies, which are businesses authorized to "implement, configure, and/or support validated" PA-DSS Payment Applications, and perform qualified installations.

== Solution providers ==
According to the PCI Security Standards Council:

The P2PE solution provider is a third-party entity (for example, a processor, acquirer, or payment gateway) that has overall responsibility for the design and implementation of a specific P2PE solution, and manages P2PE solutions for its merchant customers. The solution provider has overall responsibility for ensuring that all P2PE requirements are met, including any P2PE requirements performed by third-party organizations on behalf of the solution provider (for example, certification authorities and key-injection facilities).

== Benefits ==
=== Customer benefits ===
P2PE significantly reduces the risk of payment card fraud by instantaneously encrypting confidential cardholder data at the moment a payment card is swiped or "dipped" if it is a chip card at the card reading device (payment terminal) or POI.

=== Merchant benefits ===
P2PE significantly facilitates merchant responsibilities:

- With a P2PE validated solution, merchants save significant time and money as PCI requirements may be greatly reduced. Payment Card Industry Data Security Standard (PCI DSS). For organizations who use a P2PE validated solution provider, the PCI Self Assessment Questionnaire is reduced from 12 sections to 4 sections and the controls are reduced from 329 questions to just 35.
- In the event of fraud, the P2PE Solution Provider, not the merchant, is held accountable for data loss and resulting fines that may be assessed by the card brands (American Express, Visa, MasterCard, Discover, and JCB). The PCI Security Standards Council does not assess penalties on Solution Providers or Merchants.
- The payment process with P2PE is quicker than other transaction processes, thus creating simpler and faster customer–merchant transactions.

== Point-to-point encryption versus end-to-end encryption ==
=== Point-to-point ===
A point-to-point connection directly links system 1 (the point of payment card acceptance) to system 2 (the point of payment processing). A true P2PE solution is determined with three main factors:

1. The solution uses a hardware-to-hardware encryption and decryption process along with a POI device that has SRED (Secure Reading and Exchange of Data) listed as a function.
2. The solution has been validated to the PCI P2PE Standard which includes specific POI device requirements such as strict controls regarding shipping, receiving, tamper-evident packaging, and installation.
3. A solution includes merchant education in the form of a P2PE Instruction Manual, which guides the merchant on POI device use, storage, return for repairs, and regular PCI reporting.

=== End-to-end ===
End-to-end encryption as the name suggests has the advantage over P2PE that card details are not unencrypted between the two endpoints. If the endpoints are a PCI PED validated PIN pad and a POS acquirer, there is no opportunity for the card details to be intercepted. It is obviously important that the endpoints (the PED and gateway) are provided by PCI accredited organisations.

== PCI point-to-point encryption requirements ==
The requirements include:

1. Secure encryption of payment card data at the point of interaction (POI),
2. P2PE validated application(s) at the point of interaction,
3. Secure management of encryption and decryption devices,
4. Management of the decryption environment and all decrypted account data,
5. Use of secure encryption methodologies and cryptographic key operations, including key generation, distribution, loading/injection, administration, and usage.
