= Merchant services =

Category of financial services

Merchant services is a broad category of financial services intended for use by businesses. In its most specific use, it usually refers to merchant processing services that enables a business to accept a transaction payment through a secure (encrypted) channel using the customer's credit card or debit card or NFC/RFID enabled device. More generally, the term may include:

- Credit and debit cards payment processing
- Check guarantee and check conversion services
- Automated clearing house check drafting and payment services
- Gift card and loyalty programs
- Payment gateway
- Payment orchestration
- Merchant cash advances
- Online transaction processing
- Point of sale (POS) systems
- Electronic benefit transfer programs, such as ration stamps (called food stamps in the U.S.).

Merchant service providers work as an intermediary between the bank, a person or organisation wanting to receive funds and the person or organisation looking to purchase goods or services. The merchant service provider will provide businesses and individuals with the requirements to accept credit cards, debit cards, and other forms of electronic payment for the transaction to take place.

Not all merchant service providers offer their merchants a specified merchant account, but act as an intermediary for their merchants by holding funds collected from successful payments under the MSPs "blanket account". Funds are then distributed to merchants according to the amounts they have processed.

For example, a retailer selling a product to a customer. The customer uses a payment card for the purchase, the merchant service provider will move the customer's funds to that of the retailer. This can usually take up to 48 hours for these funds to be credited to the retailer's bank account. Some merchant service providers offer cash advance services to transfer funds faster.

Merchant service providers typically require the merchant to have a merchant account with the provider, either directly or through a referral partner, such as banks or B2B service companies. All banks in the United Kingdom, except for Barclays/Barclaycard, offer merchant services by referring customers to a merchant service provider. A Merchant services provider will set up a merchant account, a special type of bank account that allows transactions to come in via the merchant payment gateway.

In the case of mPOS systems, mobile pin entry devices (PED) are typically connected to a mobile phone through Bluetooth and then use the phone's WiFi or mobile data to connect with the banks. This system does not require a merchant account although the companies that offer this type of service will still have a relationship with an acquirer. The cost of payments made through mPOS are significantly higher so it is more suitable for businesses that do not put through many card transactions. There is usually also a charge for buying the device from the mPOS system provider.
