= Card association =

A card association or a bank card association is a network of issuing banks and acquiring banks that process payment cards of a specific brand.

== Examples ==
Familiar payment card association brands include UnionPay, RuPay, American Express, Discover, Diners Club, Troy and JCB.

While once card associations, Visa and Mastercard have both become publicly traded companies.

== Statistics ==
Among United States consumers alone, over 600 million payment cards are in circulation.

== Card scheme models ==
Card schemes are often described as either three-party or four-party systems. The European Central Bank defines a three-party card scheme as one in which the scheme itself acts as issuer and acquirer, together with the cardholder and the accepting party. This contrasts with a four-party card scheme, in which the issuer and acquirer are separate from the card scheme itself.

In practice, many major international card networks operate primarily as four-party schemes in which the network provides rules and infrastructure while separate financial institutions issue cards and acquire merchants. Research published by the Bank for International Settlements identifies Visa and Mastercard as examples of four-party card schemes.
