= Payment =

Transfer of value from one party to another

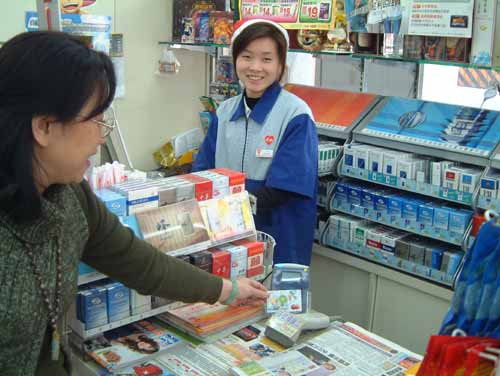
Payment with a bank card in a store in Taiwan

A payment is the tender of something of value, such as money or its equivalent, by one party (such as a person or company) to another in exchange for goods or services provided by them, or to fulfill a legal obligation or philanthropy desire. The party making the payment is commonly called the payer, while the payee is the party receiving the payment. Whilst payments are often made voluntarily, some payments are compulsory, such as payment of a fine.

Payments can be effected in a number of ways, for example:

- the use of money, whether through cash, cheque, mobile payment or bank transfers.
- the transfer of anything of value, such as stock, or using barter, the exchange of one good or service for another.

In general, payees are at liberty to determine what method of payment they will accept; though normally laws require the payer to accept the country's legal tender up to a prescribed limit. Payment is most commonly affected in the local currency of the payee unless the parties agree otherwise. Payment in another currency involves an additional transaction for the conversion. The payee may compromise on a debt, i.e., accept part payment in full settlement of a debtor's obligation, or may offer a discount, e.g. for payment in cash, or for prompt payment, etc. On the other hand, the payee may impose a surcharge, for example, as a late payment fee, or for use of a certain credit card, etc.

Payments are frequently preceded by an invoice or bill, which follows the supply of goods or services, but in some industries (such as travel and hotels) it is not uncommon for money to be required before the service is performed or provided. In some industries, a deposit may be required before services are performed, which acts as a part pre-payment or as security to the service provider. In some cases, progress payments are made in advance, and in some cases part payments are accepted, which do not extinguish the payer's legal obligations. The acceptance of a payment by the payee extinguishes a debt or other obligation. A creditor cannot unreasonably refuse to accept a payment, but payment can be refused in some circumstances, for example, on a Sunday or outside banking hours. A payee is usually obligated to acknowledge payment by producing a receipt to the payer. A receipt may be an endorsement on an account as "paid in full". The giving of a guarantee or other security for a debt does not constitute a payment.

== Etymology ==
The root word "pay" in "payment" comes from the Latin "pacare" (to pacify), from "pax", meaning "peace". In the Middle Ages, the term began to be used more broadly, to mean "to pacify one's creditors". As the Latin word was made part of Old French "paier", it retained the meaning "appease" but gained the meaning "to pay" (as in paying a debt). The Middle English word "payen", which came from the French, was also used in both ways.

== Types and methods of payment ==
There are two types of payment methods; exchanging and provisioning. Exchanging involves the use of money, comprising banknotes and coins. Provisioning involves the transfer of money from one account to another, and involves a third party. Credit card, debit card, cheque, money transfers, and recurring cash or ACH (Automated Clearing House) disbursements are all electronic payments methods. Electronic payment technologies include magnetic stripe cards, smartcards, contactless cards, and mobile payment.

Progress payments or instalment payments are often used to allow payment in stages for the construction of buildings or other assets. Instalment payments were planned for in the case of Cadogan Petroleum Holdings Ltd v Global Process Systems LLC, where the latter would pay in instalments for the acquisition of two gas plants. Their contract stated that ownership would not pass until the payments were complete and that any failure to pay an instalment would allow Cadogan to rescind the contract, "without prejudice to any accrued rights". The High Court ruled that the wording allowed Cadogan to retain the instalments which had been paid even though they did not acquire the assets in exchange. The court referred to a text written by Jack Beatson, later a Lord Justice of Appeal, on Discharge For Breach: The Position of Instalments, Deposits and other Payments due before Completion, which Eder J described as a "most valuable analysis" of the correct contractual construction of such payments.

An initial up-front partial payment for the purchase of an expensive item or service is often referred to as a "down payment"; this is also called a deposit in British English.

== Parties involved ==
A payment may involve more than two parties. For example, a pre-paid card transaction usually involves four parties: the purchaser, the seller, the issuing bank and the acquiring bank. A cash payment requires at least three parties: the seller, the purchaser and the issuer of the currency. A barter payment requires a minimum of two parties: the purchaser and the seller.

== Providers ==
The infrastructure and electronic clearing methods are formed by the payment provider. Global credit card payment providers are Diners Club, Visa, American Express and MasterCard. Maestro and Cirrus are international debit card payment providers. PayPal also provides an online debit card with digital currency Blockchain also provides an infrastructure for payments using digital currency.

== Global market ==
In 2005, an estimated $40 trillion globally passed through some type of payment system. Roughly $12 trillion of that was transacted through various credit cards, mostly the 21,000 member banks of Visa and MasterCard. Processing payments, including the extension of credit, produced close to $500 billion in revenue. In 2012, roughly $377 trillion passed through noncash payment systems. This led to total account and transaction revenues of nearly $524 billion.

=== Debit cards ===
In the U.S., debit cards are the fastest-growing payment technology. In 2001, debit cards accounted for 9 percent of all purchase transactions, and this is expected to double to 18.82 percent in 2011.

=== Mobile payments ===
There is a fast growth of mobile payments around the world. Google Pay, Apple Pay and Samsung Pay are the three main choices for mobile payments, while some banks also allow NFC Payments. In some countries, mobile wallets have become a dominant way of making mobile payments.

=== Cheques ===
Historically, cheques have been one of the primary means of payment for purchasing goods and services, though their share in the payment mix is falling worldwide. In 2001, in the United States, cheques accounted for 25% of the U.S.-based payment mix, and in 2006, this was projected to fall to 17%.

== Timing ==
The timing of payment has legal implications in some situations. For tax purposes, for example, the timing of payment may determine whether it qualifies as a deduction in a taxpayer's calculation of taxable income in one year or the next.

For U.S. tax purposes, cash payments generally are taken to occur at the time of payment. Payment may also occur when a person transfers property or performs a service to the payee in satisfaction of an obligation. A payment by cheque is normally deemed to occur when the cheque is delivered, as long as the cheque is honoured on presentation by the payee. This rule also generally applies where the cheque is not presented to the bank until the next taxable year, even though the payer could stop payment on the cheque, in the meantime. Postdated cheques, however, are not considered payment when delivered. Generally, payments by credit card take effect at the point of the sale and not when a payer is billed by the credit card company or when the payer pays the credit card company's bill. A business that reports on an accrual basis would report income in the year of sale although payment may be received in a subsequent year.

Payment of most fees to government agencies by cheque, if permitted, usually takes effect after a set number of days for clearance or until the cheque is actually cleared. Payments by credit card, if permitted, and cash payments take immediate effect. Normally, no other forms of payment are permitted or accepted.

Commercial late payments and interest entitlements arising from payment delay are regulated in some countries, for example in Member States of the European Union, under the Late Payment Directives of 2000 and 2011. In India, the Government eMarketplace system for public procurement automatically calculates penal interest due for delayed public sector payments.

== See also ==
- Accounting
- APACS (the former name of the UK Payments Administration)
- Business
- Commerce
- Financial transaction
- Money
- Money transmitter
- Trade
