= Payment service provider =

Company that assists business to accept payment methods

A payment service provider (PSP) is a third-party company that allows businesses to accept electronic payments, such as credit card and debit card payments. PSPs act as intermediaries between those who make payments, i.e. consumers, and those who accept them, i.e. retailers.

They will often provide merchant services and act as a payment gateway or payment processor for e-commerce and brick and mortar businesses. They may also offer risk management services for card and bank based payments, transaction payment matching, digital wallets, reporting, fund remittance, currency exchange and fraud protection. The PSP will typically provide software to integrate with e-commerce websites or point of sale systems.

== Operation ==
PSPs establish technical connections with acquiring banks and card networks, enabling merchants to accept different payment methods without the need to partner with a particular bank. They fully manage payment processing and external network relationships, making the merchant less dependent on banking institutions.

PSP can also offer risk management services for card and bank based payments, transaction payment matching, reporting, fund remittance and fraud protection. Some PSPs provide services to process other next generation methods (payment systems) including cash payments, wallets, prepaid cards or vouchers, and even paper or e-check processing.

PSP fees are typically charged in one of two ways: as a percentage of each transaction, or as a fixed cost per transaction.

US-based online payment service providers are supervised by the Financial Crimes Enforcement Network (or FinCEN), a bureau of the United States Department of the Treasury that collects and analyzes information about financial transactions in order to combat money laundering, terrorist financiers, and other financial crimes.

European payment service providers are supervised based on the European Payment Services Directive.

== Security ==
Each merchant remains responsible for his own actions and must accordingly ensure that the selected provider observes the guidelines, e.g. with regard to data protection. Compliance with PCI DSS guidelines is important. There are four levels of PCI compliance, that must be respected by the PSP. Depending on the volume of transactions as well as other details about the level of risk assessed by payment brands, the payment service provider has to follow higher standards.

The levels are as follows:

- Level 1 – Over 6 million transactions annually;
- Level 2 – Between 1 and 6 million transactions annually;
- Level 3 – Between 20,000 and 1 million transactions annually;
- Level 4 – Less than 20,000 transactions annually.

== Market size ==
As of 2022, there were more than 900 payment providers in the world. More than 300 offer services just for Europe and North America. The global payment service provider market is expected to reach $US88 billion by 2027 from $US40 billion in 2019.

== Regulatory history ==
=== China ===
In 2010, the People's Bank of China issued administrative measures regarding online non-financial payment services. These measures retroactively recognized the legal status of online third-party payment platforms like Alipay. Prior to the 2010 measures, these services existed in a legal grey area.

== See also ==
- E-commerce payment system
- Mobile payments
- Payment gateway
- Payment processor
- Payments as a service
