= Issuing bank =

Bank that offers payment cards

An issuing bank is a bank that offers card association branded payment cards directly to consumers and businesses, such as credit cards, debit cards, contactless devices such as key fobs as well as prepaid cards. The name is derived from the practice of issuing cards to a consumer.

== Details ==
An issuing bank (also called an issuer) is part of the 4-party model of payments. It is the bank of the consumer (also called a cardholder) and is responsible for paying the merchant's bank (called an Acquiring Bank or Acquirer) for the goods and services the consumer purchases. It issues the payment card and holds the account with the consumer (such as a credit card account or checking account for a debit card).

The parties in the 4-party model are:

1. Consumer (also called a cardholder): Makes purchases and promises to pay the Issuing Bank for them.
2. Issuing Bank (also called an Issuer): The consumer's bank. Transfers money for purchases to the Acquiring Bank. Is liable for purchases made by the consumer if the consumer does not pay.
3. Acquiring Bank (also called an Acquirer): The merchant's bank. Accepts money for purchases. Is liable for charges made by the merchant if it does not provide goods or services purchased.
4. Merchant: Sells goods and services and accepts credit, debit or prepaid cards as promise for payment.

The issuing bank assumes the primary liability for the consumer's capacity to pay off debts they incur with their card. In the case of credit cards, this includes extending credit to make these purchases. In the case of debit cards, this includes debiting funds from bank accounts, such as checking accounts.

In the case of credit cards, the issuing bank extends a line of credit to the consumer. Liability for non-payment is then shared by the issuing bank and the acquiring bank, according to rules established by the card association brand.

== Key types of risk for issuing banks ==
There are a few main types of risk for issuing banks, primarily regarding whether the approved transaction(s) will be paid for by a legitimate cardholder.

1. Account fraud: This is when an account is opened by a fictional person or with a stolen identity. The cardholder makes many purchases but then disappears without paying.
2. Transaction fraud: This is when a fraudulent charge is made to a legitimate account, such as with credit card fraud via a stolen card number. With the rollout of EMV chip cards in the US, much of this fraud has moved to online transactions. Since the cardholder is not responsible for fraudulent charges, the issuer is responsible to pay for the charges.
3. Credit risk: when extending credit (or in the case of debit cards, overdraft privileges), an issuer must be able to assess the likelihood of being repaid the amount of credit extended. As such, credit limit assignment and payment delinquency forecasts are critical to their profitability.

== Statistics ==
As of December 31, 2017, there were 20.48 billion credit, debit, and prepaid cards in circulation worldwide. In 2018, there were 6.958 billion payment cards, including 1.122 billion credit cards, in the United States.

== See also ==
- Acquiring bank
