= List of online payment service providers =

The following is a list of notable online payment service providers and payment gateway providing companies, their platform base and the countries they offer services in:

(POS -- Point of Sale)

Company	Platform	Location
2C2P	Online, POS, mobile	Singapore
Adyen	Online, POS, mobile	Australia, Austria, Belgium, Brazil, Bulgaria, Canada, Croatia, Cyprus, Czech Republic, Denmark, Estonia, Finland, France, Germany, Gibraltar, Greece, Hong Kong (Hong Kong SAR), Hungary, Iceland, India, Ireland, Italy, Japan, Latvia, Liechtenstein, Lithuania, Luxembourg, Malaysia, Malta, Mexico, Netherlands (HQ), New Zealand, Norway, Poland, Portugal, Puerto Rico, Romania, Singapore, Slovakia, Slovenia, Spain, Sweden, Switzerland, Turkey, United Arab Emirates (UAE), United Kingdom, United States
Alipay	Online, POS, mobile	China
Amazon Pay	Online	Austria, Belgium, Cyprus, Denmark, France, Germany, Hungary, India, Ireland, Italy, Japan, Luxembourg, Netherlands, Portugal, Spain, Sweden, Switzerland, United Kingdom, United States
Apple Pay	Mobile, online	United States (except Puerto Rico & other unincorporated territories), United Kingdom (excluding British Overseas Territories but including Crown Dependencies), Canada, Australia, China (including Hong Kong and Macau), Singapore, South Korea, Switzerland, France, Monaco, Russia, New Zealand, Japan, Spain, Ireland, Taiwan, Italy, San Marino, Vatican City, Denmark (including Greenland and Faroe Islands), Finland, Sweden, United Arab Emirates, Brazil, Ukraine, Poland, Norway, Kazakhstan, Belgium, Germany, Czech Republic, Saudi Arabia, Austria, Iceland, Hungary, Luxembourg, Netherlands, Bulgaria, Croatia, Cyprus (except Northern Cyprus), Estonia, Greece, Latvia, Liechtenstein, Lithuania, Malta, Portugal, Romania, Slovakia, Slovenia, Georgia, Belarus, Montenegro, Serbia, Mexico, Morocco
Atos	Online	Global (headquarters in France and Germany)
Authorize.Net	Online	Australia, Canada, United Kingdom, United States, Europe
BHIM	Online, POS, Mobile, QR	India
BitPay	Online (bitcoin)	United States
bKash	Mobile, online	Bangladesh
BPAY	Online	Australia
Braintree	Mobile, online, POS	Australia, Canada, Europe, Hong Kong, Malaysia, New Zealand, Singapore, United States
CM		The Netherlands
Creditcall	Online, POS, mobile	United Kingdom, United States
CyberSource		
DigiCash		
Digital River		Minnetonka, Minnesota, United States
Dwolla		United States
Easypaisa	Online, mobile	Pakistan
Edy		
Elavon		
Euronet Worldwide	Online, POS	
eWAY		Australia, New Zealand, Singapore, Hong Kong, Macau
First Data	POS	United States
Fortumo	Online, mobile	Bangladesh, Cambodia, Indonesia, Kazakhstan, Malaysia, Myanmar, Pakistan, Philippines, Singapore, South Korea, Sri Lanka, Taiwan, Thailand, Vietnam, Bahrain, Cameroon, Côte d'Ivoire, Egypt, Iraq, Kenya, Kuwait, Morocco, Mozambique, Palestine, Qatar, Saudi Arabia, Senegal, Tunisia, Turkey, United Arab Emirates, Albania, Belarus, Bosnia & Herzegovina, Bulgaria, Croatia, Czech Republic, Estonia, Georgia, Hungary, Kosovo, Latvia, Lithuania, North Macedonia, Montenegro, Poland, Romania, Russia, Serbia, Slovakia, Slovenia, Ukraine, Austria, Cyprus, Belgium, Denmark, Finland, France, Germany, Greece, Ireland, Italy, Luxembourg, Netherlands, Norway, Portugal, Spain, Sweden, Switzerland, United Kingdom, Brazil, Chile, Colombia, Ecuador, Mexico, Uruguay, Canada
Google Pay	Online, POS, mobile, QR	Albania, Argentina, Armenia, Australia, Austria, Azerbaijan, Belgium, Bosnia and Herzegovina, Brazil, Bulgaria, Canada, Cayman Islands, Chile, Colombia, Costa Rica, Croatia, Cyprus, Czech Republic, Denmark, Ecuador, Estonia, Finland, France, Georgia, Germany, Greece, Hong Kong, Hungary, Iceland, Ireland, India, Israel, Italy, Japan, Kazakhstan, Kuwait, Kyrgyzstan, Latvia, Liechtenstein, Lithuania, Luxembourg, Malaysia, Malta, Mexico, Moldova, Montenegro, Netherlands, New Zealand, North Macedonia, Norway, Poland, Portugal, Qatar, Romania, San Marino, Serbia, Singapore, Slovakia, Slovenia, South Africa, Spain, Sweden, Switzerland, Taiwan, Thailand, Ukraine, United Arab Emirates, United Kingdom, United States, Vietnam, Morocco
Heartland Payment Systems	Online, POS, mobile	United States
Hitpay	Online, POS, mobile, In-Store, QR	Australia, India, Malaysia, Philippines, Singapore, Thailand, United States
iKhokha	POS	South Africa
Ingenico	POS	France
InstaPay	Online	Philippines
IP Payments		Australia, New Zealand, United Kingdom
JazzCash	Online, mobile	Pakistan
Klarna		Australia, Austria, Belgium, Denmark, Finland, France, Germany, Italy, Netherlands, Norway, Spain, Sweden, Switzerland, United Kingdom, United States
Leaf Holdings	POS	Boston
Lesaka	Online	South Africa
Maya (formally PayMaya)	POS, QR	Philippines
M-Pesa	Mobile	Kenya, Tanzania, India, Lesotho, DRC, Ghana, Mozambique, Egypt
Mir		Russian Federation, South Ossetia, Turkey, Armenia, Kyrgyzstan
MobiKwik	Online, POS, Mobile, QR	India
MPay		Thailand
Nagad	Mobile, online	Bangladesh
Neteller		
Novalnet	Online, POS, mobile	Worldwide. Headquartered in Germany
Oceanpayment		Hong Kong
OFX	Online	Australia, Canada, Hong Kong, New Zealand, United Kingdom, United States
Opayo	Online, POS	United Kingdom/Ireland
PagSeguro		Brazil
Paya	Online, POS	North America
Payfast	Online	South Africa
PayMe	Online, POS, Mobile, QR	Hong Kong
Paymentwall		United States
Payoneer		United States
PayPal	Online	United States, Argentina, Australia, Austria, Belgium, Brazil, China, France, Spain, Netherlands, Hong Kong, Japan, Canada, Mexico, Germany, Poland, Russia, Singapore, Sweden, Switzerland, United Kingdom, Italy, India
PayPay		Japan
PayPoint		United Kingdom, Ireland, Romania
Paysafe Group	Online, POS, mobile, MO/TO	United Kingdom, United States, Canada, Austria, Bulgaria, Germany, Netherlands, Australia, Spain
Paytm	Online, POS, Mobile, QR	India
PayU	Online	Netherlands, India, South Africa, Russia, Mexico, Brazil, Argentina, Chile, Colombia, Czech Republic, Hungary, Nigeria, Panama, Peru, Poland, Romania, Slovakia, Turkey
PayZapp	Online, POS, Mobile, QR	India
PhonePe	Online, POS, Mobile, QR	India
PlaySpan		United States
Qiwi		Russia and neighboring countries
RazorPay	Online	Singapore
Realex Payments		Ireland United Kingdom
Red Dot Payment		Singapore
SafeCharge International	Online, mobile, POS	United Kingdom
Shop Pay	Online, mobile, POS	Australia, Austria, Bulgaria, Belgium, Canada, Croatia, Cyprus, Czech Republic, Estonia, Denmark, Finland, France, Germany, Gibraltar, Greece, Hong Kong, Hungary, Ireland, Italy, Japan, Latvia, Liechtenstein, Lithuania, Luxembourg, Malta, Mexico, Netherlands, New Zealand, Norway, Poland, Portugal, Romania, Singapore, Slovenia, Spain, Sweden, Switzerland, United Kingdom, United States.
Skrill (formerly Moneybookers)		United Kingdom
Square	Online, mobile, POS	United States, Canada, Japan, Australia, United Kingdom
Stripe	Online, mobile	Australia, Austria, Belgium, Canada, Denmark, Finland, France, Germany, Hong Kong, Ireland, Italy, Japan, Luxembourg, Malaysia, Netherlands, New Zealand, Norway, Portugal, Singapore, Spain, Sweden, Switzerland, United Kingdom, United States (invite-only in Brazil, Estonia, Greece, India, Latvia, Lithuania, Mexico, Poland, Slovakia, Slovenia)
Tencent	Online, POS, mobile	China
TransferMate		Ireland
Wise (formally known as Transferwise)		United Kingdom
TrueMoney		Thailand, Southeast Asia
Trustly	Online, mobile	Austria, Belgium, Bulgaria, Croatia, Czech Republic, Cyprus, Denmark, Estonia, Finland, France, Germany, Greece, Hungary, Ireland, Italy, Latvia, Luxembourg, Malta, Netherlands, Norway, Poland, Portugal, Romania, Slovakia, Slovenia, Spain, Sweden, United Kingdom
Ukash		United Kingdom
Verifone	POS	United States
Viva Wallet	Mobile, POS, online, QR, MO/TO	Austria, Belgium, Bulgaria, Croatia, Cyprus, Czech Republic, Denmark, Ireland, Finland, France, Germany, Greece, Hungary, Italy, Luxembourg, Malta, Netherlands, Norway, Poland, Portugal, Romania, Spain, Sweden, United Kingdom
WebMoney		Russia
WeChat Pay	Mobile, POS, online	China
WePay		United States
Worldpay		United Kingdom
WorldRemit		United Kingdom
Xsolla		Russia, United States
Yandex.Money		Russia
Yoco	Online, mobile, POS	Africa, Middle East
Ziina	Online, mobile, POS	United Arab Emirates

== See also ==
- Payment gateway
- Payments as a service
- Ripple (payment protocol)
