= Betsy Z. Cohen =

American business executive

Betsy Zubrow Cohen
- Born: Betsy Zubrow; October 29, 1941 (age 84); Philadelphia
- Education: Bryn Mawr College; University of Pennsylvania Law School

Betsy Z. Cohen (born October 29, 1941) is the Co-Founder and Chairman of Cohen Circle (formerly FinTech Masala), a multi-stage investment firm that she started with her son, Daniel Cohen. Since 2015, the firm has provided transformative capital to late stage fintech growth companies and makes investments across the capital structure in the fintech, technology, and impact spaces, with $5bn+ in capital raised.

Cohen is the founder and former CEO of The Bancorp, an internet provider of financial services to non-bank fintech companies. From 1974 through 1999 she was founder, chairman and CEO of Jefferson Bank, an FDIC-insured financial institution headquartered in Philadelphia, Pennsylvania.

Cohen has been on a variety of philanthropic and corporate boards, including Aetna, Inc., Asia Society, The Brookings Institution, and The Metropolitan Opera. She was on the Bryn Mawr College Board of Trustees for 29 years and remains one of the Emeriti trustees. She is an Honorary Trustee of the Metropolitan Museum of Art.

== Early life and education ==
Cohen is the daughter of Dr. Sidney N. and Molly Zubrow. She was born and raised in Philadelphia, Pennsylvania, and attended Philadelphia High School for Girls. She studied philosophy at Bryn Mawr College (B.A. 1963) and law at the University of Pennsylvania Law School (J.D. 1966).

== Career ==
=== Law and early entrepreneurship ===
Cohen’s first job was as Law Clerk to the Honorable John Biggs, Chief Judge of the U.S. Court of Appeals for the Third Circuit. In 1968 she began teaching insurance, banking, and anti-trust law at Rutgers Law School.

During the same period she founded a shipping business in Hong Kong, a leasing company in Brazil, and a joint venture with a bank in Spain. Cohen also co-founded a Philadelphia law firm, where she specialized in representing financial institutions and industry clients in complex real estate and financial matters. She practiced law until 1983-84, when she left the firm to focus on banking.

=== Jefferson Bank ===
In 1974, at age 32, Cohen received the first new bank charter granted by the State of Pennsylvania in 11 years to found Jefferson Bank in Downingtown, Pennsylvania. She was the first female bank CEO in Pennsylvania and one of the nation’s first female bank CEOs. Cohen was chairman and CEO of Jefferson Bank and its public holding company, JeffBanks, Inc., until the institution was sold to Hudson United Bank in 1999. At the time of its sale Jefferson Bank was the largest local financial institution in the greater Philadelphia region.

=== The Bancorp ===
Cohen founded The Bancorp in 1999 and was Chief Executive Officer of The Bancorp, Inc. (NASDAQ: TBBK) and its subsidiary, The Bancorp Bank, until retiring in December 2014. During this period, the company provided internet banking and financial services to approximately 1600 non-bank fintech companies.

=== Cohen Circle ===
As Co-Founder and Chairman of Cohen Circle, Cohen and her team have raised over $5bn in capital. The firm's venture investments include Ocrolus, Maxwell, Curve, H2O.AI, Greenwood, and BillGO. In March 2021, Cohen brought her ninth special-purpose acquisition companies (SPAC) to market.

Cohen sponsored her first SPAC, FinTech Acquisition Corp., in January 2015, and was chairman until it completed a merger with CardConnect Corp. (NASDAQ: CCN) in July 2016.

She was Chairman of FinTech Acquisition Corp. II, from 2017 until completing a merger transaction with Intermex Holdings II, Inc., the parent company of Intermex Wire Transfer, LLC; newly renamed International Money Express, Inc. (NASDAQ: IMXI)., in July 2018.

From 2019 through August 2020, Cohen was chairman of FinTech Acquisition Corp. III, which successfully merged with Paya (NASDAQ: PAYA), a leading integrated payments provider.

In August 2020, Cohen became chairman of FTAC Olympus Acquisition Corp. (NASDAQ: FTOC), which in February 2021 announced a merger with Payoneer Inc., a global payment and commerce-enabling platform that upon reorganization will operate as Payoneer, a U.S. publicly listed entity with an implied estimated enterprise value of ~$3.3 billion at closing.

Cohen became chairman of FinTech Acquisition Corp. IV in September 2020. On December 30, 2020 the SPAC announced plans to merge with global financial advisory firm Perella Weinberg Partners to take the firm public (NASDAQ: PWP); the transaction reflects implied equity value for the reorganized company of ~$975 million.

Cohen became chairman of FinTech Acquisition Corp. V (NASDAQ: FTCVU) in December 2020. On March 15, 2021, trading platform eToro announced plans to merge into the SPAC in an agreement that valued the combined company at about $10.4 billion, which was devalued to $8.8 billion in December 2021.

In February 2021, Cohen became chairman of FTAC Athena Acquisition Corp., (NASDAQ: FTAAU; “FTAA”); which announced its initial public offering on February 23, 2021.

In March 2021, Cohen became chairman of FTAC Hera Acquisition Corp. (NASDAQ: HERAU), which on March 4, 2021, announced pricing of its upsized initial public offering.

In March 2021, Cohen became chairman of FTAC Parnassus Acquisition Corp (NASDAQ: FTPAU), which on March 16, 2021, announced the completion of its initial public offering.

== Accolades ==
Cohen has received awards from numerous business organizations and publications, including the Greater Philadelphia Chamber of Commerce, Drexel University, and National Foundation for Women Business Owners, which in 1997 named her one of 50 leading entrepreneurs of the world. In 2009, US Banker named her one of 25 Women to Watch. She is a past recipient of the Sandra Day O’Connor Board Excellence Awards (from DirectWomen) and the Elizabeth Dole Glass Ceiling Award (Southeastern Pennsylvania American Red Cross).
