= Gambling in Angola =

Gambling in Angola is regulated by the general law and there is not a specific gambling law to cover each gambling category as it is in the other countries. The most popular form of gambling is most likely casino gambling. There are few casinos throughout the country, all of which offer a number of table games and slot machines. The Angolan government is currently working on a new gambling regulatory bill that will focus on customer protection. Gambling operators will also be required to pay annual fees and obtain licenses to operate under the new gambling laws.

== Gambling law ==
There is no law to prohibit individuals from visiting foreign online casinos. In early 2016, the Angolan parliament passed new gambling legislation that sought to control casinos, lotteries and online gambling. The law also aims to tax the business and provide the government with money derived from the game. In addition, the law provides absolute state administration in relation to all games of chance, however, the state will reserve the right to allow personal entities to enter into business.

== Online gambling ==
Online casinos are not regulated, although a substitution law introduced in 2016 indicates that Angolan authorities are committed to thinking about the problem. There is currently no Angola home online casino. People have the option to bet online through an international websites but online gambling is not spread and popular.

== Gambling age ==
Gambling age is defined by the law. The people below the age of 18 cannot gamble.

== Payment gateways ==
There is not any obstacle when depositing money to the foreign or local bookies. Users deposit money using the bank cards or ewallets such as Skrill or Neteller. There is not any legal restriction or service blocking.
