= Sage Pay =

Payment company

Sage Pay Limited

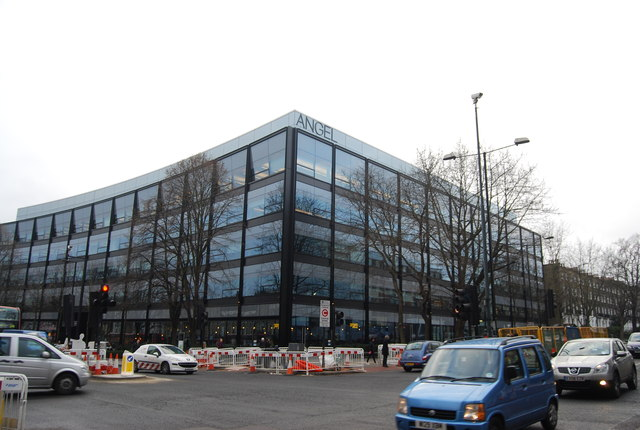
- Sage Pay's London offices at the Angel Building
- Trade name: Sage Pay
- Formerly: Protx; Sage Pay; Opayo
- Type: Subsidiary
- Industry: Payments processing
- Founded: 2001; 25 years ago
- Defunct: 2020
- Fate: Acquired by Elavon and folded into their business
- Headquarters: London, United Kingdom; Newcastle upon Tyne, United Kingdom (registered office)
- Area served: UK, Ireland
- Revenue: £41 million (2018)
- Net income: £15 million (2018)
- Number of employees: 300
- Parent: Elavon
- Website: www.sagepay.co.uk

Sage Pay was a payment processing service operated by Sage Group between 2006 and 2020. Originally founded as Protx, the company provided online, telephone, and point-of-sale payment solutions to small and medium-sized businesses across the United Kingdom, Ireland, Germany, Spain, South Africa, and the United States.

In 2020, Sage Pay's UK and Ireland business was acquired by Elavon, a subsidiary of U.S. Bancorp, and rebranded as Opayo before being fully integrated under the Elavon brand.

== History ==
=== UK and Ireland ===
The Opayo business was founded in 2001 as Protx, a business that processes online payments for small and medium sized businesses. Sage Group purchased Protx for £20 million in 2006. Protx had 10,000 customers in 2006. Protx was rebranded as Sage Pay in April 2009. Sage Pay entered the Irish market and opened a customer service centre in Newcastle upon Tyne during the same year.

As of 2019 Sage Pay had 300 employees and serves 50,000 customers.

In February 2012, Sage Pay expanded into card machine payments when they acquired Integral Computers Ltd for €20 million. Integral Computers was founded in 1989 and its point of sale technology was used in 25,000 locations in 2012 across the UK and Ireland.

In 2019, Sage Pay and Worldpay, Inc. announced a partnership to provide additional services in the UK and Ireland.

In November 2019, Elavon announced the acquisition of the UK and Irish Sage Pay business for £232 million. The Sage Salary and Supplier Payments portion of Sage Payments was not included in the deal with Elavon. The sale was completed on 11 March 2020 and the business was rebranded as Opayo in July of the same year. By 2024 the Opayo brand had fallen out of use with the business simply operating under the wider group's Elavon brand name.

=== Germany and Spain ===
Sage Pay launched in Germany in October 2012 and in Spain in September 2013.

=== South Africa ===
In May 2010, Sage South Africa announced the acquisition of Netcash (Pty) Ltd, a company that provides transaction processing services in three primary areas: electric funds transfer payments, debit order collections and credit card transaction processing.

Netcash had been established in 2002. In 2013 Sage Netcash was rebranded as Sage Pay. Sage sold the South African payments business in July 2019 for £5 million. The South African business reverted to its Netcash name in December 2019. and launched Netcash Shop in 2021 as an online platform solution.

=== United States ===
Sage previously operated a payments processing service in the United States called Sage Payment Solutions. Sage Group divested the US Sage Payments Solutions business to GTCR in 2017 for $260 million. Sage Payments Solutions was later rebranded as Paya.

== See also ==
- List of online payment service providers
