= Forter =

Online fraud prevention technology company

- Type: Private
- Industry: Internet fraud prevention; E-Commerce
- Founded: 2013; 13 years ago
- Founders: Michael Reitblat; Liron Damri; Alon Shemesh
- Headquarters: Tel Aviv, Israel; New York City, United States
- Key people: Michael Reitblat (CEO)
- Products: Fraud analytics; Fraud prevention
- Website: www.forter.com

Forter is a software as a service (SaaS) company that unifies identity protection, payments optimization and fraud prevention in a single consumer authentication platform. The company's technology applies artificial intelligence and machine learning to pinpoint the identity behind any digital commerce interaction. This ensures that good consumers can complete their transactions, while fraudsters and serial abusers are blocked. Since the company's founding in 2013, Forter has processed more than $1 trillion in digital commerce transactions and amassed a dataset of more than 1.5 billion online identities.

== History ==
The company was founded in 2013 by software engineers from Fraud Sciences, which was bought and integrated into PayPal in 2008. Before working at Fraud Sciences, the founders served in the Israeli Army's Intelligence unit. In 2023, Forter acquired Israel start-up Immue, and integrated its bot detection and mitigation capabilities into its core platform.

== Funding ==
Forter's funding includes a combined $525 million from Sequoia Capital, Scale Venture Partners, New Enterprise Associates, March Capital Partners, and Salesforce Ventures. In May 2021, Forter raised $300 million in a Series F round led by Tiger Global Management, valuing the company at $3 billion.

== Technology ==
According to specialists, the challenge to online retailers seeking to prevent online fraud is to be able to assess the customer's trustworthiness in real-time without blocking a legitimate sale or delaying it so long the customer abandons the purchase. In its 2018 analysis of the online fraud detection and prevention, SaaS firms that included both established and newer firms (for example, SAS and Feedzai), Gartner Group categorized Forter's technology as fraud analytics. This includes behavioral analysis of customers' established shopping patterns, soft linking (the ability to trace relationships between users even when no overt information is shared) and other techniques. Forter offers clients the option of full restitution in the event of a chargeback.

== See also ==
- Chargeback fraud
- Internet fraud prevention
- EMV - Chip and PIN Credit Cards
