= Bidpay =

Bidpay may refer to:

- BidPay, an internet payments system
- The Indian sage of Panchatantra, or The Fables of Bidpai, a collection of fables
