= Rain (platform) =

American financial technology company

- Type: Private
- Industry: Financial technology
- Founded: 2021
- Founders: Farooq Malik; Charles Yoo-Naut
- Headquarters: New York City, United States
- Key people: Farooq Malik (CEO); Charles Yoo-Naut
- Products: Stablecoin payment infrastructure

Rain is a private financial technology company founded in 2021 and headquartered in New York City, United States. The company provides stablecoin-powered payment infrastructure, enabling businesses to issue payment cards and digital wallets funded by cryptocurrencies. As of January 2026, the company was valued at $1.95 billion.

== History ==
Rain was founded in 2021 by Farooq Malik and Charles Yoo-Naut to integrate stablecoins with existing payment networks. In 2022, it raised $6 million in a seed funding round led by Lightspeed Venture Partners, with participation from Coinbase Ventures, Uniswap Labs, and Terraform Labs.

In 2024, Rain partnered with the payments company Nuvei as part of a blockchain-based payments initiative focused on stablecoin settlement for cross-border transactions in Latin America.

In March 2025, Rain raised $24.5 million in a Series A funding round led by Norwest Venture Partners (Galaxy Ventures, Goldcrest, Thayer, and Hard Yaka also participated in the investment). In August of the same year, it secured approximately $58 million in Series B funding led by Sapphire Ventures.

Also in 2025, Rain partnered with Visa through its pilot program for stablecoin settlement. Rain provided backend infrastructure, compliance layers and settlement logic to improve the capital efficiency of stablecoin-linked card programs launched by fintech companies. In November 2025, Rain joined a digital asset initiative by Western Union, allowing users to convert stablecoins into local currency through Western Union's network.

In January 2026, the company raised $250 million in a Series C round led by ICONIQ Partners, valuing the company at approximately $1.95 billion. Other investors included Sapphire Ventures, Dragonfly, Bessemer Venture Partners, Galaxy Ventures, FirstMark, Lightspeed, Norwest and Endeavor Catalyst.

By early 2026, annual transaction volumes exceeded $3 billion in over 150 countries.

== Services ==
Rain provides a platform that integrates stablecoins with traditional payment systems. It operates as a Visa Principal Member, allowing cards issued through its platform to be used on the Visa network.

The platform enables businesses to issue virtual and physical payment cards linked to stablecoin balances. These cards can be used for consumer transactions, business payments, payroll, and other use cases. Rain also supports digital wallet integration, including custodial and non-custodial models, allowing users to onramp USD to stablecoins, and hold and spend digital assets.

== Operations ==
Rain's platform connects blockchain-based settlement systems with traditional card networks. Transactions conducted through its cards are funded by stablecoins and settled on supported blockchain networks. Rain operates as a business-to-business infrastructure provider serving financial technology companies, cryptocurrency platforms, and enterprises that integrate digital asset payments into their services. The company does not operate as a bank or cryptocurrency exchange.
