= Twenga =

Online open shopping search engine

- Company type: Price Comparison
- Industry: E-Commerce
- Founded: 2006
- Founder: Bastien Duclaux; Cédric Anès
- Headquarters: Paris, Paris, France
- Area served: Portugal, Spain, France, Italy, United Kingdom, Germany, Austria, Ireland, Poland, Netherlands, Switzerland, Sweden, Belgium, Australia, United States, Canada
- Services: Price Comparison Site and Shopping Ads on Google and Microsoft

Twenga.com is an online open shopping search engine.

== Business model ==
Twenga co-founders Bastien Duclaux and Cédric Anès met in 2000 at the École Nationale Supérieure des Télécommunications. The company's "crawl" technology enables Twenga to scan tens of millions of pages of the Internet every day, automatically categorizing hundreds of millions of products in ten languages including Russian, Japanese and Chinese. This proprietary technology allowed Twenga to raise nearly €7 million from venture capital firms 3i, Sofinnova and others. By 2010, Twenga employed 120 people, including 50 research engineers.

From its headquarters in Paris, Twenga runs 14 websites for markets in the United States, UK, France, Spain, Italy, Germany, the Netherlands, Sweden, Poland, Brazil, Russia, Australia, China and Japan. The sites display 300 million products from more than 200,000 online shops.

The websites do not sell directly; instead they redirect users to online shops where they purchase products. Twenga itself generates revenue primarily by "advertising and business partnerships which give interested companies and retailers greater visibility than that provided by organic listing."

In 2011 Twenga joined other e-commerce companies and filed an antitrust complaint to the European Commission claiming that Google abuses its dominant position by promoting their own products such as Google Shopping while penalizing competitors in the search results.

== Product expansion ==
Since 2008 Twenga has been developing mobile apps to make all its B2C services available via smartphone and tablets. The company currently offers apps for iPhone, iPad and Android.

Starting in 2010, Twenga has launched its own merchant partner program Twenga Ready to Sell in seven countries including France, Germany and the UK. The program allows e-tailers to directly index their products on Twenga to gain additional visibility and traffic.

In 2011 Twenga expanded its activities by creating affinitAD, a program that offers contextual monetization solutions for publishers.

In 2012 the company launched Showcase, a social shopping platform that allows users to share their favorite products with others and follow the recommendations of fellow shoppers.

In 2014, Twenga completed the launch of two suites of acquisition solutions: Smart LEADS and Smart SEM. These solutions enabled merchants of all sizes to be promoted on major search engines using a proprietary algorithm that optimized their traffic acquisition at adjusted ROI targets. Additionally, Twenga became a Google AdWords Premium SMB Partner and raised 10 million euros from Idinvest Partners.

In June 2017, Google was fined by the EU for unfair dominance in Google Shopping and opened the advertising space to price comparators like Twenga. Consequently, advertisers now must be represented by one or more “Comparison Shopping Services” (CSS) to participate in the channel. Twenga became a Google CSS Premium Partner and launched a CSS solution dedicated to marketplaces, Shopping Premium, which is based on artificial intelligence.

In 2022, Twenga expanded its scope and launched a fully integrated marketing module available on top e-commerce platforms such as Shopify, Prestashop, and Shopware: Shopping Push. This plug-and-play solution made Twenga’s e-commerce platform and price comparison accessible to small and medium-sized businesses. In 2024, launches of the free Shopping Push Starter plan

== Awards ==
In 2010, Twenga won the Red Herring 100 Global Award, the France Young Technology Leader Award and the Ernst & Young Entrepreneur of the Year Award for the "Company of the Future" category for France.
