= Novalnet =

European payment service provider

Novalnet AG
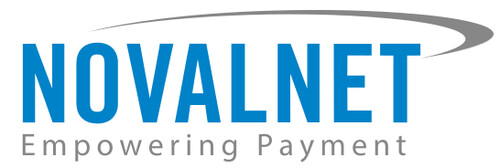

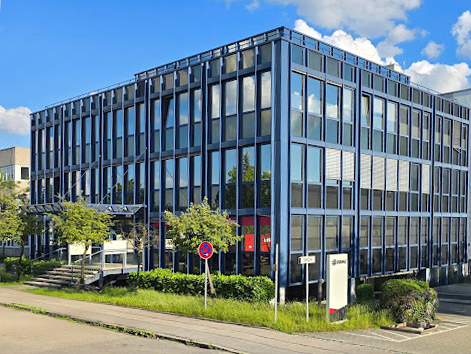
- Office in Munich, Germany
- Type: Aktiengesellschaft
- Industry: Financial services, Payment processor, Payment system, E-Commerce, Point of sale
- Founded: 2007
- Founder: Gabriel Dixon (CEO)
- Headquarters: Munich, Germany
- Number of locations: Germany (Munich); UK (Croydon); USA (New York); India (Chennai)
- Area served: Worldwide
- Services: Payment service provider; Payment processing; Risk management; Acquiring; Payment facilitating; Escrow account; Payment gateway; Invoicing; Affiliate & Marketplace; Debt collection
- Number of employees: 200
- Website: www.novalnet.com

Novalnet is a European payment service provider that provides e-commerce businesses with electronic and point-of-sale payment processing services. The Novalnet platform is designed to automate merchants' business processes across the e-commerce value chain, from checkout to debt collection.

Novalnet's competitors include companies such as Adyen and Stripe.

== Payment platform ==
The Novalnet SaaS platform allows merchants to integrate payment services into pre-existing or custom-built systems, such as online shops, marketplaces, content management systems (CMS), customer relationship management (CRM) software, enterprise resource planning (ERP) systems, and inventory management software (WAWI). The platform enables integration through various methods, including APIs (application programming interfaces), iFrames, SDKs (software development kits), and WebViews, establishing a real-time data flow for payment processing, fraud prevention, and other payment-related services.

== History ==
Novalnet was founded in 2007 by Mr. Gabriel Dixon. While remaining profitable since 2008, Novalnet continues ot remain independent of external investors with Mr. Gabriel Dixon (CEO) as the chairman of the board.

== Growth ==
Between 2011 and 2016, Novalnet received the "Usage Award” at the European MPE Awards, and was one of the nominees for the Bavarian SME Award hosted by the European Business Forum. In 2011 Novalnet came first as the “Best Payment-Service Provider 2011” at the t3n Magazin Web Awards.

In 2017 Novalnet was awarded Deloitte's "Technology Fast 50” prize for high growth in turnover over the last four years.

In 2018 Novalnet received the “Best Payment service Provider” prize in the E-Commerce Berlin Awards.

Novalnet AG's revenue grew by 37.82% in the first quarter of 2020, compared to the first quarter of 2019. Novalnet had grown its earnings by 28% in 2019 with a total revenue of 1.35 billion euros. The company was recognized as one of FOCUS Business Ranking's “German Growth Champion 2020" and “Growth Champion 2021”, indicating a significant increase in turnover between 2015 and 2019. The payment platform has received the “Software hosted in Germany” quality seal every year since 2019.

In 2021 Novalnet received the E-Commerce Germany Awards in two categories: 1st place in the Best Solution for International Expansion category and 3rd place in the Best payment service provider category. Novalnet's Shopware plugin was featured as one of the best apps in the "App of the Week" section at Shopware Store. In February 2021, Novalnet was included in the book “Wirtschaftsstandort Freistaat Bayern”.

== Licenses and certifications ==
Novalnet AG is a licensed payment institute accredited by the Federal Financial Supervisory Authority (BaFin) and has the PCI DSS Level 1 certification.

== See also ==
- List of online payment service providers
- Payment gateway
- Payment service provider
