= SafeCharge =

Canada-based payments technology company

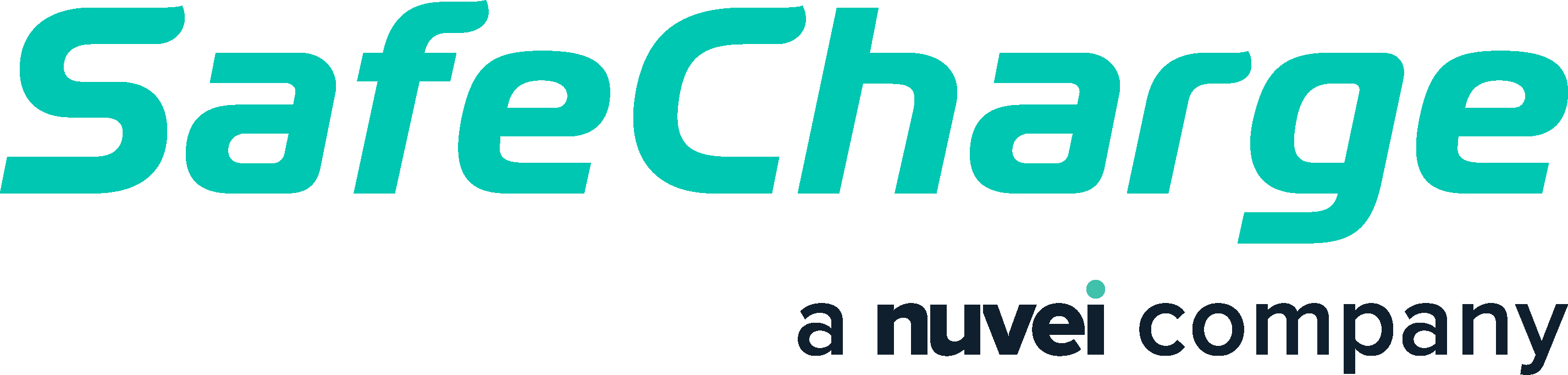
- Company type: Privately held company
- Industry: Payment services
- Founded: 2006
- Founder: Teddy Sagi; David Avgi
- Defunct: 2019
- Fate: Acquired by Nuvei
- Headquarters: Montreal, Canada
- Number of locations: 13 sites
- Area served: Worldwide
- Services: Omnichannel payment services, fraud prevention solutions and connection to payment method
- Number of employees: 400 (2019)
- Website: safecharge.com at the Wayback Machine (archived 2020-03-09)

SafeCharge, was a Canadian payment service provider that provided payment services, fraud prevention solutions and connection to payment methods. In August 2019 SafeCharge was acquired by Nuvei, a privately owned electronic payment processing company, for the amount of US$889 million and was merged into Nuvei.

Before the acquisition the company had 400+ employees, 54% of them were in development and tech support. Its headquarters were in Montreal, Canada, and it had offices in Israel, UK, Netherlands, Hong Kong, Italy, Austria, China, Cyprus, Bulgaria, Guernsey, Mexico, Singapore and in the US.

SafeCharge had payment processing (gateway) licenses from the main card schemes in Europe: Visa and Mastercard. It connected with 300+ global and region-specific alternative payment methods, such as: WeChat Pay and Alipay (China), Apple Pay (US), iDeal (Netherlands), POLi (Australia), PayPal (global), and Amex (global).

== History ==
SafeCharge was co-founded by Teddy Sagi and David Avgi in 2006 in Israel with operations in Bulgaria.

In 2013, SafeCharge received principal membership status for merchant acquiring by Visa and Mastercard Europe. It is an acquiring bank and licensed as a member of Mastercard as of 2014 and of Visa as of 2015.

The company began trading on the London Stock Exchange in 2014. At that time, SafeCharge International had revenues of $43.18 million, and it raised $126 million from public offerings with its IPO pricing. That was the second largest IPO out of the main Israeli companies going public in 2014.

In 2017, SafeCharge International expanded to the Asian markets via a partnership with 2C2P, and working with WeChat Pay in London’s Camden market.

In 2018 The company was authorized as a payment institution by the UK Financial Conduct Authority.

In 2019, Nuvei Corporation announced its acquisition of SafeCharge, and agreed to pay US$889 million in cash for it. The deal saw Nuvei pay $5.55 for each SafeCharge share, representing a 25% premium to the London-listed company's stock.

In August 2019, Nuvei completed the acquisition. In the same month, the AIM Stock Exchange in London agreed to SafeCharge's application for the cancellation of the admission to trading SafeCharge shares on AIM.

In February 2020, Credit card company Max signed a deal with SafeCharge to acquire control of CreditGuard.
