= Red Dot Payment =

Online payment service provider

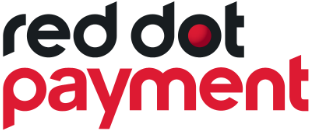
- Founded: 2025
- Country of origin: Singapore
- Area served: Singapore, Thailand, Indonesia
- Founder(s): Randy Tan
- Industry: Payment Gateway
- URL: https://reddotpayment.com/

Red Dot Payment (RDP) is an online payment service provider headquartered in Singapore. The fintech company provides online payment gateway systems, payment consulting and merchant acquisition services for businesses that require the processing of online credit card transactions.

== History ==
Established in 2011, Red Dot Payment (RDP) was founded by Randy Tan, who is currently acting as its managing director. Initially starting out in Singapore, it has expanded to other regions of Southeast Asia such as Thailand and Indonesia.

In 2014, Red Dot Payment acquired funding from investors, GMO Global Payment Fund and Wavemaker Pacific. In the same year, Red Dot Payment started supporting MasterPass, enabling their merchants' payment page to be used with MasterPass.

In 2015, Red Dot Payment became partners with Sourceguru and provided digital payments service to them.

In 2016, Red Dot Payment secured a seven-figure funding by MDI Ventures, the venture arm of Indonesia's Telkom.

In 2017, Red Dot Payment partnered with Ascott to provide them with secure online payments. Red Dot Payment now provides online payment for both e-commerce and hotels. Within the same year, the company closed an investment of $5.2M Series B round

Red Dot Payment formed an alliance with e-commerce services companies Shopmatic and iCommerce Asia, to offer services to South-east Asian region's e-commerce market.

In 2018, David Lee joined Red Dot Payment as its Director effective February 2018.

Red Dot Payment signed a Memorandum of Understanding with Finserve Africa Limited at the opening of Enterprise Singapore Nairobi Centre. It is one of the Singaporean fintech companies to enter Africa and provide digital finance services.

In July 2019, fintech and e-payment business PayU took a majority stake in Red Dot Payment. The deal valued Red Dot Payment at US$65 million and saw founder and CEO Randy Tan retain a stake in the firm, while majority of its shareholders exited.

== See also ==
- Electronic money
- List of on-line payment service providers
