= US Bankcard Services =

U.S. Bankcard Services, Inc.
- Industry: Financial services
- Founded: 1996; 30 years ago, in California, United States
- Founder: Chris Chang
- Headquarters: City of Industry, California, U.S.
- Area served: United States
- Key people: Chris Chang (president)
- Services: Payment processing Credit card terminals Gift/loyalty cards POS systems QuickDining; Mobile processing
- Website: http://www.usbsi.com/

U.S. Bankcard Services, Inc. (USBSI) is a provider of merchant services for credit card and other electronic payment transactions. The company is located in City of Industry, California, United States, and serves the United States. US Bankcard Services is an Elavon, Inc. company.

== History ==
USBSI was founded in 1996 by the current president, Chris Chang. East Asian and Southeast Asian merchants account for a majority of their customer base. In 2018, USBSI was purchased by U.S. Bancorp subsidiary, Elavon.

== Services ==
USBSI provides payment processing services for several electronic payment methods such as:

- major American credit cards: Visa, MasterCard, American Express and Discover
- EBT cards, check cards and debit cards
- Gift cards
- Check services
- UnionPay cards, operating under the approval of the People's Bank of China and used by Chinese tourists
- JCB
- Alipay payment service

Most of USBSI's merchants are restaurants and other food industry. However, its other merchants include mail order / telephone order, retail, ecommerce, supermarket and hotel businesses.

== Multilingual payment terminal ==
In 2006, USBSI and Hypercom Corp. (recently acquired by VeriFone) entered into an exclusive software agreement to offer the first multilanguage card payment terminal featuring Chinese and English graphics and text.
