= Yuval Tal =

Israeli entrepreneur

- יובל טל
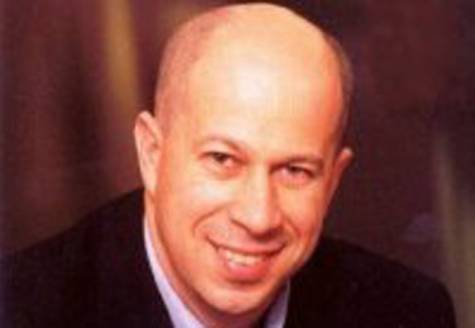
- Yuval Tal
- Born: August 1965 (age 61); Israel
- Occupation: Founder
- Known for: Founder of Payoneer; co-founder of Borderfree

Yuval Tal (Hebrew: יובל טל; born August 1965) is an Israeli entrepreneur. He founded BorderFree in 1999 and Payoneer in 2005, later joined Team8 as a fintech managing partner, and co-founded Linguana in 2023.

== Early life and education ==
Tal was born in 1965 in Israel and was a former Israeli Special Forces commando in the Israeli Defense Forces. He earned a B.Sc. in mechanical engineering and an M.Sc. in biomedical engineering from Tel Aviv University.

== Career ==
In 1999, Tal founded Borderfree (initially known as E4X), a cross-border e-commerce and payments company. He served as the company's CEO from 1999 to 2005. Borderfree went public on the NASDAQ (BRDR) in 2014 and was later acquired by Global-e.

Tal founded Payoneer in 2005, and served as its CEO until 2010, later becoming the company's president. In 2021, Payoneer went public following a SPAC merger.

In 2020, Yuval Tal joined Team8 as the Fintech Managing Partner, later becoming an Operating Partner. In 2023, Tal co-founded Linguana with Oded Shafran, a company focused on global distribution and monetisation for creators, including multilingual video localisation.
