= Ukash =

Former UK-based electronic money system

- Type: Private company
- Industry: Financial services
- Founded: 2005
- Defunct: August 2015
- Fate: merged into paysafecard
- Headquarters: London, United Kingdom
- Products: Ukash
- Parent: Smart Voucher Ltd.
- Website: www.ukash.com

Ukash was a UK-based electronic money system that allowed users to exchange their cash for a secure code to make payments online. It was acquired by Skrill Group in April 2014 and merged into Austrian competitor paysafecard, acquired by Skrill a year earlier. All existing vouchers expired after 31 October 2015. Remaining ones could be exchanged into paysafecard PINs, in May 2016 paysafecard announced completion of the process.

The system allowed users to exchange their cash for a secure code. The code was then used to make payments online, to load cards or e-wallets or for money transfer. Codes were distributed around the world by participating retail locations, kiosks and ATMs.

== History ==
The service was founded in 2005.

In 2013, the company supported the launch of AvoidOnlineScams.net, which offers information about how to avoid online scams and ransomware.

In June 2014 Ukash launched the Ukash Travel Money Prepaid MasterCard, a reloadable prepaid MasterCard for euros and U.S. dollars that could be used anywhere that accepted MasterCard.

In April 2015 Ukash became part of Skrill Group. As a result, the Ukash online cash voucher scheme was replaced with Skrill Group's paysafecard scheme on 31 October 2015. Ukash distribution stopped on 31 August 2015 and any existing vouchers could be spent until 31 October 2015.

== Process ==
Ukash users were given a unique 19-digit code representing their prepaid money; this was entered when making a transfer, payment or purchase online. If the purchase was less than the value of the code a new 19-digit code could be provided by merchants able to issue ukash, just like change in an offline cash transaction.

== Online scams ==
The "bearer" of Ukash could spend it online anywhere it was accepted. Some scammers were reported to have been exploiting the Ukash system for black market use by extorting codes from victims. Fraudsters promised cheap loans or other services in exchange for a fee. Some offered items for sale on sites like Gumtree but these items did not exist. Others would infect a computer with Ransomware and demand the payment using methods including Ukash.

In 2012, the company issued advice to consumers on staying safe with Ukash. It said "The best way for consumers to avoid becoming victims of fraud is to guard Ukash codes like cash. Each Ukash code is unique and like cash, must be kept safe and therefore never emailed or given to anyone else over the telephone."

Ukash was designed solely for making payments online and at participating merchants. Most online scams reported obtained Ukash by asking the victim to email the code or give it out over the telephone.

== See also ==
- E-commerce
- Online banking
- Prepayment for service
- Vouchers
