= Openbucks =

Openbucks is an alternative payment gateway founded in 2010 and based in Silicon Valley. It enables online merchants to accept cash and retailer gift cards as a form of payment. Consumers can redeem, like cash, the branded gift cards of major U.S. and Canadian retailers directly at a merchant's checkout as an alternative to credit card payments. The company participated in TechCrunch Disrupt in 2011 to showcase its payment platform.

Openbucks was acquired by payment processor Paysafe Group in July 2020 for an undisclosed amount of money.
