= Nuvei =

Global payments technology company

Nuvei Corporation
- Formerly: Pivotal Payments
- Type: Private
- Traded as: TSX: NVEI; Nasdaq: NVEI
- Industry: Financial services; Payment processor; E-commerce
- Founded: 2003; 23 years ago
- Founder: Philip Fayer
- Headquarters: Montreal, Quebec, Canada
- Area served: Worldwide
- Revenue: ▲US$1.19 billion (2023)
- Operating income: ▲US$117 million (2023)
- Net income: ▼US$−696 million (2023)
- Total assets: ▲US$5.14 billion (2023)
- Total equity: ▲US$2.04 billion (2023)
- Owner: Advent International (46%); Philip Fayer (24%); Novacap (18%); Caisse de dépôt et placement du Québec (12%)
- Number of employees: 2,357 (2026)
- Website: nuvei.com

Nuvei Corporation, formerly known as Pivotal Payments, is a Canadian payment processor headquartered in Montreal, Quebec. The company provides payment-processing and acquiring services for online and in-person transactions. Nuvei went public on the Toronto Stock Exchange in 2020 and later listed on Nasdaq in 2021.

In November 2024, Nuvei was taken private in a US$6.3 billion transaction led by Advent International, and its shares were delisted from both exchanges. In June 2026, Nuvei agreed to acquire Nasdaq-listed cross-border payments company Payoneer for approximately US$2.75 billion.

== History ==
=== Early years and expansion (2003–2019) ===
Nuvei, formerly Pivotal Payments, was established in 2003 by Philip Fayer. Fayer founded the company while taking time off from Concordia University. The company offered electronic payment processing and merchant services for point of sale and online businesses.

In 2006, the company received an investment from Goldman Sachs totaling CA$60 million to fund its acquisition strategy. The following year, Pivotal acquired the assets of Cardex Corporation. In 2009, Pivotal acquired Canadian processor Tangerine Payment Solutions.

In September 2017, Montreal-based private equity firm Novacap and the public pension fund manager Caisse de dépôt et placement du Québec announced a joint investment in the company. The investment valued the company at CA$525 million (US$424 million). At the time, Fayer had been considering a sale of the company to a competitor, but instead chose the investment from Novacap and CDPQ, providing additional capital for the company's expansion into e-commerce.

On October 23, 2018, Pivotal Payments announced that it was rebranding as Nuvei, combining its corporate business with its GlobalOnePay division under the new brand. The corporate entity formally adopted the name Nuvei Corporation on November 27, 2018.

In August 2019, Nuvei completed its acquisition of SafeCharge for CA$1.1 billion (US$889 million), based on a price of US$5.55 per SafeCharge share, representing a 25% premium to the London-listed company's stock.

=== Public listing and acquisitions (2020–2023) ===
Nuvei completed its initial public offering on the Toronto Stock Exchange in September 2020, then the largest technology IPO in the exchange's history. Following the exercise of the underwriters' over-allotment option, the offering generated gross proceeds of US$805 million.

Later that year, Nuvei completed its acquisition of Smart2Pay and announced an agreement to acquire Base Commerce, a U.S. payment-processing company.

In May 2021, Nuvei agreed to acquire Simplex, an Israeli cryptocurrency payment infrastructure company, for approximately US$250 million in cash.

The acquisition of payment provider Mazooma was completed in August 2021. In September, Nuvei acquired payments company Paymentez as part of its expansion in Latin America.

In October 2021, Nuvei filed for a public offering in the United States and subsequently began trading on Nasdaq.

A December 2021 report by short seller Spruce Point Capital Management questioned aspects of Nuvei's management and accounting, after which the company's shares fell sharply. Nuvei rejected the allegations. A related proposed securities class action was discontinued against Nuvei and the other remaining defendants in February 2023.

In January 2023, Nuvei announced an agreement to acquire Nasdaq-listed payments company Paya Holdings Inc. for approximately US$1.3 billion. Paya, an Atlanta-based payments company that originated as the payment-processing arm of Sage, had gone public through a SPAC merger in 2020. The acquisition expanded Nuvei's presence in integrated and software-embedded payments.

On April 17, 2023, actor and investor Ryan Reynolds announced an investment in Nuvei. Spruce Point issued a second report concerning Nuvei in April 2023. In June, the firm disclosed that it no longer held a short position in the company.

=== Going private (2024) ===
Nuvei acquired Australian payment technology company Till Payments in January 2024 for approximately US$36.9 million. The acquisition followed a period of financial difficulties at Till Payments, which had previously been valued at approximately A$500 million.

In 2024, Nuvei launched direct acquiring in Colombia after receiving authorization from the country's financial regulator, its first such licence in Latin America.

Advent International agreed on April 1, 2024, to acquire Nuvei in an all-cash transaction valuing the company at approximately US$6.3 billion, or US$34 per share, a 56 percent premium to its closing price before reports of the transaction.

The transaction was completed on November 15, 2024. Nuvei's shares were delisted from the Toronto Stock Exchange and Nasdaq. Fayer, Novacap and CDPQ retained approximately 24%, 18% and 12% of the private company, respectively, while Fayer remained chair and CEO.

=== Since going private (2025–2026) ===
In January 2025, Nuvei completed the acquisition of Paywiser Japan Limited, including an acquiring licence granted by Japan's Ministry of Economy, Trade and Industry, giving the company direct-acquiring capabilities in Japan.

The company began operating as a direct local payment acquirer in Canada in June 2025. In December 2025, Nuvei received a Crypto-Asset Service Provider licence under the European Union's Markets in Crypto-Assets Regulation (MiCA), as well as a payment institution licence.

In April 2026, Nuvei launched direct acquiring in Mexico, extending its locally licensed processing infrastructure to the market.

Nuvei entered into a definitive agreement in June 2026 to acquire Payoneer for approximately US$2.75 billion in cash, or US$7.40 per share. The combined businesses were expected to process more than US$500 billion in annual payment volume for more than 2.4 million customers and generate approximately US$3 billion in annual revenue. The transaction is expected to close in mid-2027, subject to Payoneer shareholder and regulatory approvals.

Several changes to Nuvei's senior management were announced in July 2026, including the appointments of Samir Zabaneh as chief operating officer, Eli Rosner as chief product and technology officer, and David McLaughlin as chief financial officer.

In September 2026, the Federal Trade Commission filed a complaint against Nuvei's U.S. operations alleging violations of the Federal Trade Commission Act and the Telemarketing Sales Rule in connection with its merchant-screening and payment-processing practices. Under a proposed stipulated order, Nuvei would pay US$4.85 million for consumer redress, be prohibited from processing payments for certain telemarketed technical-support services, and be required to strengthen its merchant-screening and monitoring practices.

== Technology and services ==
=== Payment processing ===
Nuvei provides payment-processing and acquiring services for online and in-person transactions. Its payment infrastructure supports card payments, alternative payment methods and recurring billing. The company also operates direct-acquiring infrastructure in several markets.

In November 2022, Virgin Atlantic selected Nuvei as a payment partner for its international payment operations.

By December 2023, Microsoft had begun using Nuvei's payment technology for recurring billing and individual transactions across its Office and Xbox product ranges in the Middle East and Africa.

During 2025, online marketplace Temu integrated Nuvei to provide additional local payment methods in markets including Japan, Poland, Belgium, the Netherlands and Portugal. Hong Kong jewellery retailer Chow Sang Sang also used Nuvei's payment services as part of its expansion into North America.

Nuvei partnered with Volkswagen Brazil in October 2025 to provide payment infrastructure for connected-vehicle services, including recurring payments through the automaker's in-vehicle multimedia system.

In February 2026, Nuvei began providing payment-processing services for MediaMarktSaturn's online marketplace in Europe.

=== Platform integrations and payment methods ===
Nuvei became a payment service provider on Outpayce's Xchange Payment Platform, developed by Amadeus for the travel industry, in January 2025. Later that year, Nuvei integrated with subscription-management company Zuora for recurring payments.

In September 2025, Nuvei added Paze, a digital wallet operated by Early Warning Services, as a checkout option for U.S. merchants. In November 2025, Nuvei integrated Visa Direct for Account, allowing clients to send payments directly to eligible bank accounts. The service was initially introduced in Europe, with expansion to additional markets planned for 2026. Later that month, the company began processing merchant transactions through Wero, the digital wallet developed by the European Payments Initiative, following pilot testing earlier in the year.

In January 2026, WEX integrated its virtual-card technology with Nuvei's network for travel-sector supplier payments. Nuvei also integrated its payment infrastructure into SYSPRO's enterprise resource planning software for manufacturers and into BlackLine's invoice-to-cash platform.

=== Infrastructure and automation ===
Nuvei introduced an artificial-intelligence-based Integration Agent in September 2025, intended to automate parts of the technical onboarding process for merchants and partners.

The following month, Nuvei announced support for Visa's Trusted Agent Protocol, a framework designed to allow merchants to identify authenticated artificial-intelligence agents conducting transactions on behalf of consumers. Nuvei participated in Visa's initial Agent Enabler pilot.

By December 2025, Nuvei expanded its existing relationship with Microsoft by moving core payment-processing APIs to Microsoft Azure and incorporating Azure AI services into its processing infrastructure. The company stated that the infrastructure was designed to support processing rates above 10,000 transactions per second and annual payment volume exceeding US$1 trillion.

In July 2026, Nuvei participated in a proof of concept with Visa, Arvato Systems and fashion retailer Kings and Priests in which an artificial-intelligence agent initiated and completed a payment on behalf of a shopper.

=== Digital assets ===
Nuvei expanded into cryptocurrency payment infrastructure through its acquisition of Simplex in 2021.

In 2025, Mastercard partnered with Nuvei and stablecoin issuers Circle and Paxos to enable merchants to receive settlement in stablecoins.

Nuvei introduced stablecoin-based payout services for selected emerging markets in August 2025, including cross-border payroll, marketplace and remittance payments.

Nuvei received a Crypto-Asset Service Provider licence under the European Union's Markets in Crypto-Assets Regulation in December 2025.

In June 2026, Mastercard announced an expansion of its stablecoin-settlement infrastructure and identified Nuvei among the institutions expected to support the additional settlement options in the United States and Latin America.
