= BidPay =

Online auction payment service website, now defunct

- Website type: Online payment service
- Owners: First Data; later CyberSource
- Commercial: Yes
- Launched: 1999
- Current status: Discontinued

BidPay was an online auction payment service website, established in 1999 by Steve Chin and Marek Bradbury that allowed auction buyers to purchase money orders online using their credit card. BidPay was purchased by First Data Corporation/Western Union in 2001 for an undisclosed sum. BidPay was rebranded as "Western Union Auction Payments" in 2003 which led to confusion with Western Union's wire transfer services; the online auction payment service reverted to the BidPay name in 2004.

BidPay was a popular payment method for auction sellers based in North America because there was no chargeback or reversal risk, as there was with competing services such as PayPal. The buyer of an item or service was responsible for all fees, and US sellers had the option of receiving an ACH payment direct into their bank account. However, when a buyer successfully made a chargeback in a disputed transaction, BidPay ended up taking the loss rather than the seller.

== History ==
BidPay was launched in 1999 as one of the early payment options for online auctions. In a 2001 article on consumer-to-consumer online transactions, legal scholar David E. Sorkin listed BidPay among online payment services used in the online auction market and noted that its model differed from services such as PayPal and Billpoint because only the buyer needed to enter into a relationship with BidPay. By December 2001, The Wall Street Journal described BidPay as a First Data unit that notified the sender and recipient by email before sending funds by regular mail using Western Union money orders. A 2004 electronic payments study prepared for Federal Reserve Financial Services described person-to-person payment companies as services commonly used in online auction environments, with PayPal dominating the segment and BidPay operating as a smaller First Data service that used Western Union's money-transfer network.

First Data discontinued BidPay's online auction payment service at the end of 2005. Service stopped operating on December 31, 2005, and would no longer provide payment services to the online auction industry. It was purchased for US$1.8 million in March 2006 by CyberSource Corporation, which announced its intention to relaunch BidPay. BidPay had over 4 million registered users worldwide at that time.

== Relaunch ==
BidPay was relaunched in June 2006 based on an operating model similar to that of a merchant account for auction sales. Sellers were now responsible for all fees and had to have a US-based bank account that accepted ACH payments since money orders were no longer issued. Before approving payment, Bidpay reviewed payments via automated fraud checks. Also, sellers had to ship by a track and trace shipper. Bidpay would assume the risk of chargebacks if the seller followed all the requirements under the user agreement.

BidPay was closed again at the end of 2007. After the shutdown, CyberSource expanded support for PayPal Express Checkout, a rival online payment service then owned by eBay.

== Service model ==
In its original model, BidPay allowed a buyer to submit credit card and transaction information through BidPay's website. BidPay charged the transaction amount and a fee to the buyer's card, then mailed a Western Union money order to the seller. The seller received an email notification after the money order was deposited in the mail and could decide whether to ship immediately or wait until the money order arrived.

The 2006 relaunch changed the pricing and risk structure. Under CyberSource, BidPay charged sellers 2.5% plus 50 cents for domestic transactions and 2.9% plus 50 cents for international payments. The relaunched service also incorporated buyer authentication tools and offered protection against some chargebacks related to claims of non-delivery, provided that the seller met shipment documentation requirements.

== See also ==
- CyberSource
- BitPay
