= PaysafeCard =

Online prepaid payment method

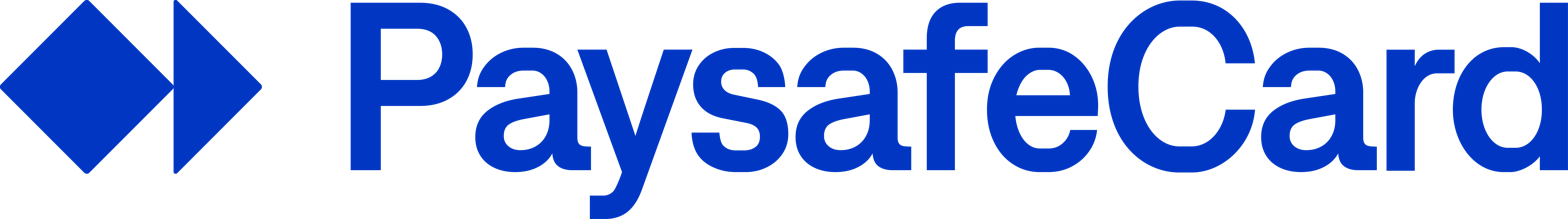
- Type: Public
- Industry: Online payments
- Founded: 2000
- Headquarters: Am Europlatz 5; 1120 Vienna, Austria
- Key people: Bruce Lowthers (CEO & Executive Director)
- Products: Electronic money
- Parent: Paysafe
- Website: www.paysafecard.com

PaysafeCard (until 2024 stylized paysafecard) is a prepaid e-commerce payment solution powered by vouchers. It is part of Paysafe, a global payments platform. PaysafeCard allows customers to pay online without providing personal financial information.

Users can purchase vouchers online or at local sales outlets and redeem them at the checkout of the respective website. As of 2024, PaysafeCard is available in approximately 50 countries, with the scope of services and partner online stores varying by country. In most countries, a personal account called myPaysafe is available for uploading codes and managing balances.

PaysafeCard was founded in Austria in 2000. Two former competitors, Dutch Wallie and British Ukash, were acquired by PaysafeCard. In 2013, it was acquired by the digital wallet provider Skrill. In 2015 the Skrill Group was acquired by the Optimal Payments Group, a global online payment processing provider regulated in the United Kingdom. Optimal Payments subsequently rebranded as Paysafe. PaysafeCard continued to be a subsidiary brand of the Paysafe Group in its own right, alongside others like the digital wallets Skrill and Neteller.

== Geographical extension ==
As of 2023 PaysafeCard is issued in approximately 50 countries—covering most of Europe and North America, Australia and New Zealand, and some countries in Western Asia and South America.

Countries with PaysafeCard available include Argentina, Australia, Austria, Belgium, Bulgaria, Canada, Croatia, Cyprus, the Czech Republic, Denmark, Estonia, Finland, France, Georgia, Germany, Greece, Hungary, Iceland, Ireland, Italy, Kuwait, Latvia, Liechtenstein, Lithuania, Luxembourg, Malta, Mexico, Moldova, Montenegro, Netherlands, New Zealand, Norway, Paraguay, Peru, Poland, Portugal, Romania, Saudi Arabia, Slovakia, Slovenia, Spain, Sweden, Switzerland, Turkey, the United Arab Emirates, the United Kingdom, the United States and Uruguay.

== Acceptance ==
Products and services available to buy with PaysafeCard include online games, social media, telecommunication, music, and others. The scope of websites accepting PaysafeCard varies per country. Examples of partners accepting PaysafeCard in 20 or more countries include Amazon, Google Play Store, Microsoft, Xbox, PlayStation, Steam, and Facebook.

== History ==
=== Early years ===
PaysafeCard is based in Vienna, Austria. It was founded in 2000 by four Austrians, including the first CEO Armin Sageder, as paysafecard.com Wertkarten AG ("paysafecard.com prepaid card Inc."), later transferred into a GmbH, a private limited company. The technical partner providing expertise and the original hardware was IBM Austria. The following year, PaysafeCard also launched in Germany. In 2004, co-founder Michael Müller assumed the role of CEO.

In 2005, PaysafeCard received an EU funding under the eTEN program supporting electronic services with a trans-European dimension. Subsequently, PaysafeCard launched in Slovenia, Greece, Slovakia, Spain and the United Kingdom. In 2008, British subsidiary Prepaid Services Company Ltd. received an EU-wide e-money licence by the British Financial Services Authority (FSA), later the Financial Conduct Authority (FCA) under the Financial Services and Markets Act 2000, expanding to a small e-money issuers certificate valid for the United Kingdom in 2006. This authorised the company to issue e-money throughout the European Union. Also in 2008, PaysafeCard Switzerland obtained a license as a financial intermediary.

=== Acquisitions ===
In August 2011, PaysafeCard acquired Dutch competitor Wallie. In February 2013, Skrill, one of the largest payment services providers in Europe completed the acquisition of paysafecard.com Wertkarten AG. A year later, CEO Michael Müller left PaysafeCard and handed over to his brother Udo Müller. In November 2014, Skrill acquired British PaysafeCard competitor Ukash and merged it into PaysafeCard. In August 2015, Skrill group competitor Optimal Payments group completed the acquisition of Skrill group, including PaysafeCard, and subsequently rebranded as Paysafe Group. On the 1st of November 2021, Paysafe completed the acquisition of viafintech, the company that developed viacash (originally Barzahlen).

== Functionality ==
=== Basic function ===
A PaysafeCard voucher is a 16-digit code sold in stores and online. Sales outlets print the voucher as a receipt. In the respective countries, PaysafeCard is available in denominations ranging from 10 to 100 euros, United States dollars, pounds sterling, and Australian dollars, and approximately equivalent sums in other currencies, e. g. 100-1000 Norwegian kroner.

When paying in an online shop, the user enters the 16-digit code, and the amount tendered is deducted from the PaysafeCard balance. Hence, the same code can be used multiple times until the full balance has been used. For larger sums, it is possible to combine multiple PaysafeCard codes.

=== Issuing ===
In contrast to in-house vouchers and prepaid products, PaysafeCard is sold and accepted at distinct companies ("Third Party Billing"). For this reason, dealing with them is a banking transaction and requires either a banking partner or a banking licence. In the beginning, PaysafeCard was issued by the BAWAG P.S.K. in Austria and the Commerzbank in Germany.

Since 2008, PaysafeCard's subsidiary company Prepaid Services Company Limited holds a licence of the Financial Conduct Authority (resp. its predecessor Financial Services Authority) "to issue electronic money (e-money) and provide payment services", valid for all countries in the European Economic Area. Therefore, in those countries, PaysafeCard is issued by Prepaid Services without external banking partner. Further, Swiss PaysafeCard subsidiary paysafecard.com Schweiz GmbH is a licensed financial intermediary in Switzerland and issuer of the product also in other countries, e.g. in Australia.

In the United States, payment regulations require an external banking partner issuing PaysafeCard, a role assumed by The Bancorp Bank.

=== Distribution ===
In the beginning, PaysafeCard was sold as a pre-printed scratchcard. Starting in 2002, PaysafeCard was sold as a printout called "eVoucher" by the company, a uniquely numbered receipt from an in-store sales terminal. PaysafeCard is distributed countrywide by various external partners, which is why the types of shops offering PaysafeCard vary by country. Typical examples include newsagents, petrol stations, post offices, pharmacies, supermarkets, electrical retailers and vending machines. The worldwide number of points of sales is more than 600,000.

=== Limitations ===
PaysafeCard has limitations manifesting especially when used for online gambling. Payments (deposits in gambling accounts) with PaysafeCard are limited to €1000; for classic PaysafeCard (not myPaysafe) this amount has been lowered to €250 in 2016 due to compliance with regulations. Some other online payment methods allow higher amounts. Also, a myPaysafe account is required to withdraw money from a gambling merchant. Withdrawals to myPaysafe accounts are supported by several online casinos, with Paysafe's President of Global Gaming, Zak Cutler, emphasising that consumer protection and safety is a focus of its casino withdrawal offering.

Unlike credit cards, PaysafeCard does not give the opportunity to overdraw user funds.

=== Additional services ===
The company offers services to supplement the classic PaysafeCard. In most countries, an online account called myPaysafe lets users buy codes and carry out repeat payments more comfortably. At the checkout of a webshop, users may choose between entering a code and signing in to their myPaysafe account. myPaysafe also offers gift card purchases – users can use their balance to buy retail and entertainment gift cards from the likes of Amazon, Nintendo or H&M.

In several countries, PaysafeCard also issues a prepaid PaysafeCard Mastercard.

In 2023, the company started offering a service called ‘Account & Card’, which provides a myPaysafe account with a virtual IBAN together with a physical or virtual prepaid card. The service lets users make SEPA transfers with their account balance but is only available in certain countries.

== PaysafeCash ==
Barcode (e-Cash) payment solution PaysafeCash was launched in 2018 by Paysafe. It is based on a barcode generated in the online checkout of an app, account, wallet or webshop when PaysafeCash has been chosen as the post payment or deposit option. The generated barcode can be sent to a mobile phone via a text message or an e-mail, uploaded to a mobile wallet, or printed out. The user shows the barcode at the nearest PaysafeCash payment store, where it is scanned and the amount due can be paid with cash. Payment stores are to be found via a location finder within the PaysafeCash app or on the PaysafeCash webpage.

PaysafeCash was created for cash-reliant users who do not possess a credit or debit card, or do not want to disclose their financial data when making online purchases or paying bills. It allows the use of traditional cash for digital payments in multiple industries such as financial services, rent payments, government and utility bills, e-commerce, and others. Retail and neobanks can offer new services to their customers, a PaysafeCash integration in their banking app provides an option for cash deposits to digital bank accounts at a brick-and-mortar store.

=== Geographical extension ===
As of 2022, PaysafeCash is available in about 30 countries in Europe and North America.

=== Acceptance ===
PaysafeCash is accepted in more than 200,000 brick-and-mortar PaysafeCash partner stores globally.

=== Recent developments ===
In August 2023, Paysafe announced an extended partnership with The Mill Adventure enabling players on the German-licensed iGaming platform to pay for their gaming experience in cash.

In March 2023, Paysafe announced a new partnership with the popular US long-distance bus transport provider Greyhound (acquired by Flixbus), offering travelers an option to make safe and secure cash payments when booking a trip online.

In December 2022, Paysafe partnered with ING Germany to strengthen its consumer offering. The cooperation enables the third largest bank in Germany to use Paysafe's cash service for cash deposits and withdrawals.

In August 2022, Paysafe announced a partnership with Exeter Finance enabling online cash payments for US auto loans.

== Awards ==
In the 2018 Austrian Great Place to Work contest, PaysafeCard won 1st place in the category New Working World and Quality of Living, as well as 10th place among all medium-sized companies.
