= Authorize.Net =

US payment gateway service provider

- Current logo, after Visa acquisition

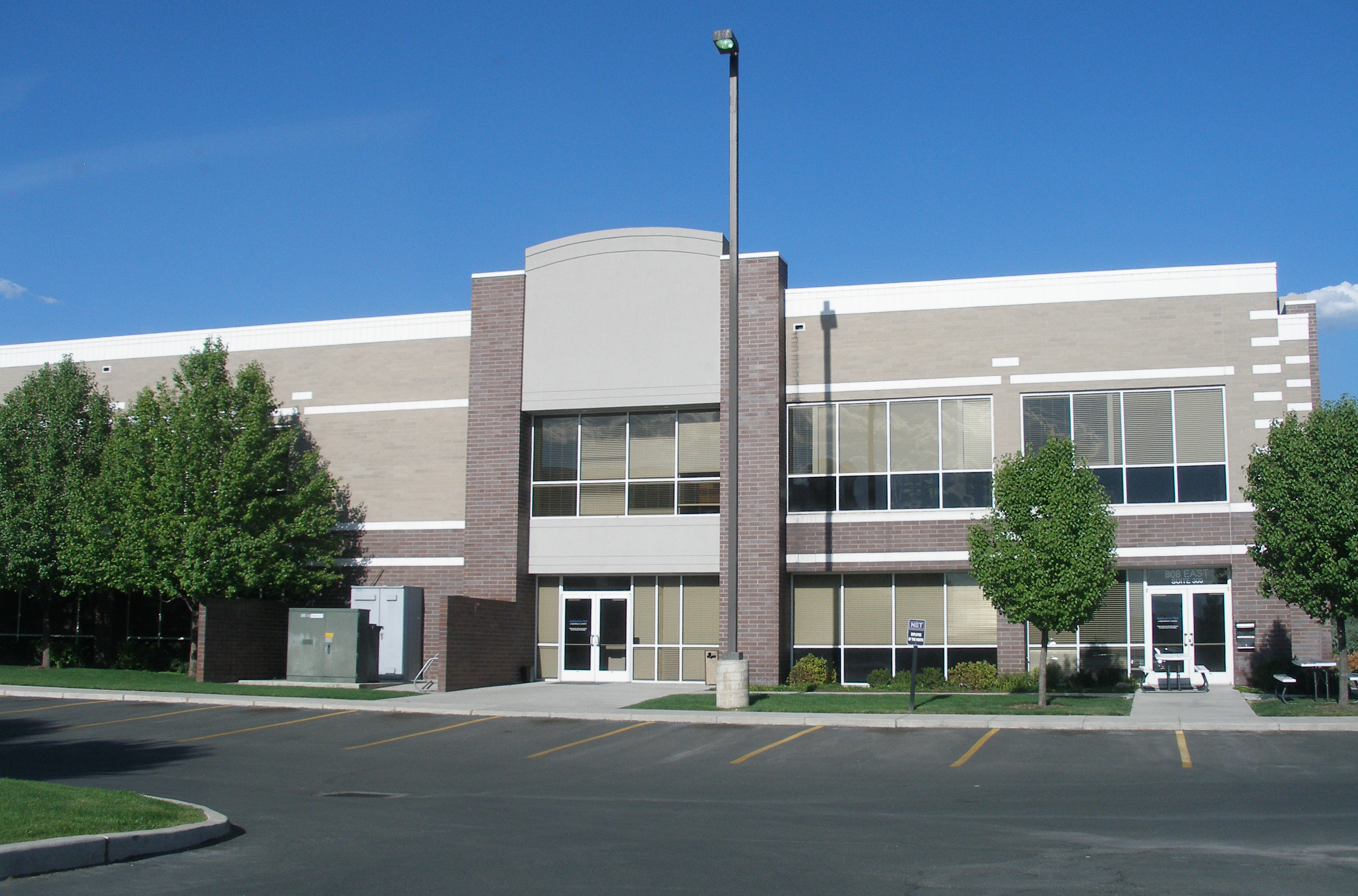
- Original headquarters of Authorize.Net in American Fork, Utah
- Type: Subsidiary
- Industry: Internet, Communications
- Founded: 1996; 30 years ago, in American Fork, Utah
- Defunct: 1999; 27 years ago
- Fate: Acquired several times since 1999: by Go2Net in 1999, then by Lightbridge in 2004, then by CyberSource in 2007; CyberSource acquired by Visa in 2010
- Headquarters: Foster City, California (2007–2010)
- Services: eCommerce Payment Management
- Parent: CyberSource
- Website: www.authorize.net

Authorize.Net is a United States–based payment gateway service provider, allowing merchants to accept credit card and electronic check payments through their website and over an Internet Protocol (IP) connection. Founded in 1996 as Authorize.Net, Inc., the company is now a subsidiary of Visa Inc. Its service permits customers to enter credit card and shipping information directly onto a web page, in contrast to some alternatives that require the customer to sign up for a payment service before performing a transaction.

== History ==
Original logo of Authorize.Net

Authorize.Net was founded in 1996, in Utah, by Jeff Knowles. As of 2004, it had about 90,000 customers.

Authorize.Net was one of several companies acquired by Go2Net, a company backed by Microsoft founder Paul Allen, in 1999, for US$90.5 million in cash and stock. Go2Net was acquired by InfoSpace in 2000 for about $4 billion; Authorize.Net was acquired by Lightbridge in 2004 for $82 million and then by CyberSource in 2007.

Visa Inc. acquired CyberSource in 2010 for $2 billion. Visa has maintained Authorize.Net and Cybersource as separate services, with Authorize.Net concentrating on small- to medium-sized businesses and Cybersource concentrating on international and large-scale payment processing. At the time of the 2010 acquisition, the company's CEO identified three priorities: expanding the ecommerce market, enhancing fraud detection and prevention, and improving data security. As of 2014, along with parent CyberSource, it had about 450,000 customers.

=== Outages ===
In September 2004, Authorize.Net's servers were hit by a distributed denial-of-service (DDoS) attack. The DDoS attack lasted for over one week and caused a virtual shut down of the payment gateway's service. The attackers demanded money from Authorize.net in exchange for stopping the attack.

On July 2, 2009, at 11:00 p.m. PDT, the entire web infrastructure for Authorize.Net (main website, merchant gateway website, etc.) went offline and stayed down all morning July 3, 2009. None of the over 200,000 merchants who used Authorize.Net payment gateway at the time were able to process credit cards. Authorize.Net's phone numbers were closed July 3 because of the July 4th holiday as previously announced on their website (although the website was down at the time). Other companies that have nearby offices have reported to the media that there was a fire. Authorize.net started a Twitter account that morning, but did not update their phones to give notice to customers until July 5 when they reopened phones.

== Services ==
Authorize.Net processes card and ACH payments for companies from small and medium-sized merchants. It offers fraud protection services, recurring billing subscriptions, and simple checkout options. For developers, it provides an application programming interface (API) and software development kits for Android and iOS. Its virtual terminal and invoice features can process manual payments. It also offers recurring billing and a plugin for the integration with Authorize.Net, and technical support is available for merchants.

Authorize.Net has the most customers of any payment processor as of 2015 and has been described as one of the more senior players in the payment processing industry, retaining a "decent portion" of the industry's market share.

== See also ==
- Electronic check
- Merchant account
- Shopping cart software
