= Elavon =

American Credit card processing company

Elavon Inc.
- Formerly: Nova Corporation
- Type: Subsidiary
- Industry: Finance and Insurance
- Founder: Edward Grzedzinski
- Headquarters: Atlanta, Georgia, U.S.
- Key people: Wally Mlynarski (CEO)
- Products: Payment Processing and Gateway Solutions
- Parent: U.S. Bancorp
- Website: www.elavon.com

Elavon Inc., formerly NOVA, is an American processor of card transactions and a subsidiary of U.S. Bancorp. Elavon offers merchant processing in more than 30 countries and supports the payment needs of more than 1,000,000 merchant locations across the globe. Elavon is the 4th largest U.S. credit card processor and is a top 6 acquirer in the European marketplace.

== History ==
In May 2000, Nova Corporation and the Bank of Ireland announced the formation a joint venture in Dublin, Ireland, to be called EuroConex Technologies which would process card payment throughout Ireland and eventually the rest of Europe.

In May 2001, U.S. Bancorp announced the acquisition of NOVA Corporation for $2.1 billion in stock and cash.

In 2004, NOVA announced that EuroConex was to buy Polish processor "CardPoint" from "Bank Zachodni WBK", owned by Allied Irish Banks, This move allowed Bank Zachodni WBK to "sponsor" Euroconex's operations in Poland.

NOVA announced deals with the Spanish Banco Santander, and the UK-based Alliance & Leicester, with 27,000 merchant accounts.

In April 2004, Nova Corporation announced that it was buying the rest of EuroConex that it did not own from the Bank of Ireland for €40m.

In April 2008, NOVA Information Systems was renamed Elavon.

In November 2019, Elavon announced the acquisition of the UK and Irish Sage Pay business from Sage Group for £232 million.

In August 2024, Elavon acquired Salucro Healthcare Solutions.

== See also ==
- US Bankcard Services Inc
