= Greenwood (bank) =

American bank

- Type: Privately Held Company
- Industry: Financial services
- Founded: 2020; 6 years ago
- Founders: Andrew Young; Michael Render; Ryan Glover
- Headquarters: Atlanta, Georgia, United States
- Area served: United States
- Key people: Aparicio Giddins (President / Chief Technology Officer); David Tapscott (Chief Marketing Officer); Andrew Young (Board Member); Paul Judge (Board Member)
- Products: Direct banking services
- Website: gogreenwood.com

Greenwood is a financial services company based in Atlanta, Georgia. First announced in October 2020, the company had 500,000 prospective members by January of the following year. Originally scheduled to open in early 2021, the bank's services were delayed due to "unexpected high demand", first to July 2021, and then to the end of the year, with general public access in early 2022. The company offers its debit card and banking services through a partnership with Coastal Community Bank. On October 13, 2026, Greenwood announced that all consumer accounts would be closed on November 19, 2026.

== History ==
Greenwood was founded by former Atlanta mayor Andrew Young, rapper–activist Michael "Killer Mike" Render, and media executive Ryan Glover with $3 million of private investors to address a lack of banking services for people of color and representation of them in traditional banks. It hopes that its competition will encourage bigger banks to reach more communities of color.

In April 2021, Greenwood announced that they developed a partnership with MasterCard and they will issue the platform’s first debit cards.

On August 5, 2021, Greenwood announced the launch of Greenwood Studios. Greenwood Content Studios will produce personal finance content targeted at the Black and Latino community covering topics like savings, investing, credit building, entrepreneurship, and wealth management.

On May 2, 2023, Greenwood announced that it had acquired Kinly, a neobank competitor focused on serving the Black community. Kinly was founded in 2020, the same year as Greenwood. Greenwood plans to integrate Kinly's technology and products into its own platform.

=== Acquisitions ===
Acquisitions by Greenwood
Acquisition date	Company	Price
May 12, 2022	The Gathering Spot	
June 22, 2022	Valence	
May 2, 2023	Kinly	

== See also ==
- Black capitalism
- Banking in the United States
