= Realex Payments =

Payment service provider

- Company type: Division
- Founded: 2000
- Headquarters: Dublin, Ireland
- Founder: Colm Lyon
- Industry: Payment processing
- Services: Payment service provider, payment gateway
- Parent: Global Payments
- Website: www.globalpayments.com

Realex Payments was a European payment service provider with offices in Dublin and London. The company provided a broad range of payment gateway services and processed transactions in excess of €35 billion per annum on behalf of more than 14,000 clients including Virgin Atlantic, Vodafone Ireland, the AA, AXA Insurance, Paddy Power and Aer Lingus.

== History ==
Realex Payments was founded in 2000 by entrepreneur, Colm Lyon. The company grew rapidly, employing over 170 staff by 2015. In 2007, it expanded into the UK market, following a surge in business being transacted online. In 2010, it signed a deal with French bank BNP Paribas which will allow payments to be processed directly into accounts in France.

In 2012, the company opened a new Dublin Headquarters on Sir John Rogerson's Quay, Dublin which was officially opened by the Taoiseach, Enda Kenny.

Lyon was Chairman of the Irish Internet Association from 2004 until December 2007. In 2005, he was a finalist of the Ernst & Young Entrepreneur of the Year Award. In 2009, he was named Internet Hero at the Eircom Golden Spiders awards for his work in setting up Realex Payments. In 2010, Lyon was involved in initiating iGap hosted by Enterprise Ireland.

In August 2013, a personal payment account for consumers called Realex Fire was launched as part of Realex Financial Services Limited. Following the acquisition of Realex Payments in March 2015, Realex Financial Services Limited was renamed Fire Financial Services Limited and its product rebranded as Pay with Fire.

== Acquisition ==
Realex Payments was acquired in March 2015 by Global Payments, an international provider of payment processing services based in Atlanta, Georgia for €115 million.

Following the acquisition, Realex Payments appointed Gary Conroy as managing director. Gary Conroy joined Realex Payments in 2015, serving as chief operating officer and deputy CEO where he managed all customer facing aspects of the business across sales, marketing, and operations.
