= Paysafe =

Online payments company

Paysafe Limited
- Type: Public
- Traded as: NYSE: PSFE; Russell 2000 component
- ISIN: BMG6964L1072
- Industry: Online payments
- Founded: 1996; 30 years ago
- Headquarters: London, England
- Key people: Dan Henson (chairman); Bruce Lowthers (CEO); John Crawford (CFO)
- Products: Electronic money Digital wallet
- Revenue: ▲US$1.71 billion (2024)
- Operating income: ▼US$133 million (2024)
- Net income: ▲US$22 million (2024)
- Total assets: ▼US$4.81 billion (2024)
- Total equity: ▼US$879 million (2024)
- Number of employees: 3,300 (2024)
- Subsidiaries: Skrill; Neteller; paysafecard
- Website: paysafe.com

Paysafe Limited (formerly known as Optimal Payments PLC) is a multinational online payments company. Paysafe offers payment processing, digital wallet and online cash systems to businesses and consumers, with particular experience of serving the global entertainment sectors. The group offers services both under the Paysafe brand and subsidiary brands that have become part of the group through several mergers and acquisitions, most notably Neteller, Skrill, SafetyPay, PagoEfectivo, PaysafeCash and PaysafeCard.

Legally domiciled in Bermuda, Paysafe’s corporate headquarters are in the United Kingdom. Various Paysafe group companies hold a number of licences from different national and state regulators including the U.S. Securities and Exchange Commission, Financial Conduct Authority and the Central Bank of Ireland. The company was listed on the London Stock Exchange and was a constituent of the FTSE 250 Index until it was acquired by a consortium of The Blackstone Group and CVC Capital Partners in December 2017. Paysafe then listed on the New York Stock Exchange on March 31, 2021 (ticker PSFE) following a merger with special purpose acquisition company Foley Trasimene Acquisition Corp II.

== History ==
The company was formed from the combination of Neteller PLC, Netbanx Ltd and Optimal Payments Limited. Netbanx was founded in 1996, Optimal Payments in 1997, and Neteller in 1999. In April 2004, Neteller PLC raised about $70 million in its initial public offering (IPO) on the London Stock Exchange.

In November 2005, Neteller PLC acquired Netbanx Ltd. In November 2008, Neteller PLC renamed itself to Neovia Financial PLC. In February 2011, Neovia Financial PLC acquired Optimal Payments of Montreal, Canada. Next month, Neovia Financial PLC changed its name to Optimal Payments PLC. In early 2012, the acquisition was revealed to be a reverse takeover with the purging of a number of the senior management along with the chairman of the board.

In July 2014, Optimal Payment PLC expanded its United States interests by purchasing Meritus Payment Solutions, a California based payment processing company, and Global Merchant Advisors, Inc. based in the U.S. in a deal worth over $235 Million. In March 2015, Optimal Payments PLC revealed that it would acquire rival Skrill group, including pre-paid voucher provider paysafecard, for a fee of around €1.1 billion. In the same year, Optimal Payments rebranded as Paysafe Group.

The company moved to the main market of the London Stock Exchange in December 2015. On 25 November 2016, Paysafe Group, owner of Neteller and Skrill, restricted the use of the Net+ Prepaid MasterCard to countries within the Single Euro Payments Area (SEPA). This left users in over 100 countries unable to withdraw cash from ATM's, which left no recourse but to make purchases with Neteller/Skrill merchant partners or transfer funds to a bank account.

In August 2017, it was announced that Paysafe would be sold to a consortium of The Blackstone Group and CVC Capital Partners for £2.96 billion, making it the largest private equity backed takeover of a London-listed company since the 2008 financial crisis. The acquisition was approved by the European Commission on 22 November 2017. On 21 December 2017, Paysafe got delisted from the London Stock Exchange.

In April 2019, with the likelihood of the upcoming withdrawal of the United Kingdom (UK) from the European Union (EU), the so-called "Brexit", Paysafe Group announced their plans to prevent any negative effects for their users and merchants. Since Brexit came into effect, the company has transferred its European Economic Area (EEA) business to newly incorporated group companies based in Ireland, namely Paysafe Payment Solutions Limited and Paysafe Prepaid Services Limited. Each company is authorized and regulated as an electronic money institution by the Irish financial services regulator, the Central Bank of Ireland.

In July 2020, it was announced that Paysafe bought payment gateway Openbucks for an undisclosed amount of money. It was also announced that the Openbucks team would become part of the parent company's eCash solutions group.

In December 2020, the company announced it had entered into a definitive agreement to merge with special-purpose acquisition company, Foley Trasimene Acquisition Corp, in a US$9 billion transaction.

In April 2022, Paysafe announced a new partnership with US-based auto finance company Exeter Finance, allowing for eCash payments for US auto loans. In the same month, the company announced Bruce Lowthers would replace Philip McHugh as CEO and executive director beginning May 1, 2022.

== Products and services ==
The company provides the following products and services:

- Neteller is an electronic money/digital wallet service that allows consumers to add, withdraw and transfer funds to and from merchants and other people. Net+ prepaid payment card available in eight currencies is mainly intended to be used with Neteller and is accepted as normal MasterCard payment card.
- Skrill is a product that allows payments and money transfers to be made through the Internet, with a focus on low-cost international money transfers.
- PaysafeCard and PaysafeCash are payment methods that allow customers to make payments online without the use of a bank account or credit card information.
- SafetyPay, an open banking and eCash platform based in Latin America.
- PagoEfectivo, a Peruvian-based alternative payments (APM) platform.
- Viacash which enables consumers to make deposits or withdraw cash from their digital bank accounts at a nearby retail store using a barcode.
- Income Access is an affiliate marketing and business intelligence provider.

== Sponsorship ==
Optimal Payments was the official sponsor of Crystal Palace Football Club for the 2014/15 and 2015/16 seasons, with the front of the team's shirts displaying Neteller's logo.

In February 2018, it was announced that Paysafe would sponsor the No. 19 Dale Coyne Racing Honda, shared by Zachary Claman DeMelo and Pietro Fittipaldi, in the 2018 Verizon IndyCar Series.

In August 2026, Paysafe was announced as the title sponsor of Envision Racing. The team will compete as Paysafe Envision Racing from the 2026–27 season of Formula E.
