= Paya, Inc. =

American company

Paya Holdings, Inc.
- Formerly: Sage Payment Solutions
- Type: Subsidiary
- Traded as: Nasdaq: PAYA
- Industry: Payments processing
- Founded: 2006; 20 years ago
- Headquarters: Atlanta, Georgia, U.S.
- Area served: North America
- Key people: Jeff Hack (CEO)
- Revenue: ▲US$283 million (2022)
- Net income: ▲US$8.26 million (2022)
- Total assets: ▲US$744 million (2022)
- Total equity: ▲US$257 million (2022)
- Number of employees: 300 (2022)
- Parent: Nuvei
- Website: paya.com

Paya Holdings, Inc. is an American payment processor service that operates in North America and is headquartered in Atlanta, Georgia. As well as its headquarters, it has offices in Florida, Ohio and Virginia.

The company provides online payments processing as well as products for face-to-face and telephone payments. It was known by the name Sage Payment Solutions while under the ownership of The Sage Group plc between 2006 and 2017. The company processes more than $30 billion for over 100,000 customers annually. The company was acquired by Nuvei in February 2023.

== History ==
Sage Payment Solutions (SPS) North America was founded in 2006 by the London Stock Exchange-listed FTSE 100 company Sage Group who primarily operate in the accounting and payroll business software industry. The same year the Sage Group had entered the payments industry in its home country, the United Kingdom, through the acquisition of Protx, though the companies were kept separate.

Sage Group divested the US Sage Payment Solutions business to GTCR in 2017 for $260 million. Sage Payments Solutions was later rebranded as Paya in January 2018.

GTCR provided Paya with $350 million in new equity. In November 2018 the company appointed their current CEO, Jeff Hack, and that same month acquired Stewardship Technologies. In January 2019 Paya acquired First Billing Services.

On August 3, 2020, Paya announced that they were merging with Nasdaq-listed FinTech Acquisition Corp. III. The merged company will be listed on the Nasdaq stock exchange under the symbol PAYA and have a value of $1.3 billion. GTCR will remain the company's largest shareholder.

In January 2023, Canadian financial services company Nuvei agreed to buy Paya in an all-cash deal worth around US$1.3 billion. The acquisition completed the next month.

== See also ==
- List of online payment service providers
