= RazorPay =

1. REDIRECT Draft:RazorPay
