= Neteller =

E-money transfer service

- Founded: 1999; 27 years ago
- Area served: Worldwide
- Key people: Bruce Lowthers (CEO)
- Industry: Online payments
- Products: Payment gateway Digital wallet Prepaid card PSP; Cryptocurrencies; Money transfer
- Parent: Paysafe
- Website: neteller.com

Neteller is a global payments platform and digital wallet used to transfer money to and from merchants, such as forex trading brokers, social networks, and gambling websites. Users in the European Economic Area (EEA) and the United Kingdom can add a Net+ Mastercard to their account to pay with their balance in stores or withdraw it as cash from ATMs. Regardless of their location, users can transfer their balance to their own bank accounts or cards if they need to withdraw the funds from their account.

Neteller is owned and operated by the international payments company, Paysafe, alongside former competitor Skrill and the prepaid payment method paysafecard.

== History ==
Neteller was launched in 1999 in Canada and moved to the Isle of Man in 2004. Paysafe Group was listed as an "Authorised Electronic Money Institution".

In 2015, Optimal Payments Plc (now Paysafe) finalized a transformational transaction for the global payments industry – the acquisition of Skrill Group, one of Europe’s largest online payments systems and among the world’s largest independent digital wallet providers.

Neteller is not a bank and does not lend customers funds. It is required under FCA e-money regulations to maintain user funds in trust accounts, separate from its operating cash, sufficient to repay all user balances at the same time.

== Online gambling ==
Neteller's logo as of 2001.

Neteller began processing online gambling payments in the year 2000, when it was processing payments for 85% of the world's gambling merchants. 95% of the company's revenue at that time was derived from fund transfers to online gaming platforms, with many users being U.S. residents.

Accounts of U.S. users were restricted as the company exited the United States, and funds were unrestricted after 30 July 2007. As a result of this enforced exit from the U.S. market, and the risks associated with online gambling, the company has sought to diversify.

High-value customers are offered a premium membership called "NETELLER VIP". It includes additional features and lower fees similar to premium membership of Skrill.

NETELLER VIP membership benefits also include earning cashback on transfers made using a NETELLER account, increased transfer limits and a free prepaid Mastercard for members with Silver, Gold, Platinum and Diamond VIP status.

Legal issues surrounding online gambling mean that users in certain countries are not permitted to make transfers to gambling merchants.

== Services ==
Neteller users can load money into their account from a bank, credit/debit card or via about 40 other payment options. Payment options vary by country, and some are instant.

Customers can use the funds in their Neteller account to pay online at merchants that accept Neteller. They can also receive payouts from merchants to their Neteller account, for instance gambling winnings or trading profits.

Other features of the service include money transfers, cryptocurrency transactions, and currency exchange.

In 2021, Neteller announced the launch of Knect, a new loyalty programme. The programme lets customers earn points for making transactions and using their Net+ Mastercard, which they can redeem for credit in their account.

=== Net+ card ===
In 2003, the company launched the Neteller Card. A few years later in 2008, the card was rebranded as Net+. Under the Net+ name, the company offers Mastercard prepaid debit cards, virtual cards, and merchant-brandable card programs.

Customers can use their card to pay anywhere Mastercard is accepted and withdraw their balance as cash. The card is only available to customers residing in the UK and European Economic Area (EEA).
