= Payoneer =

Financial services company

Payoneer Global Inc.

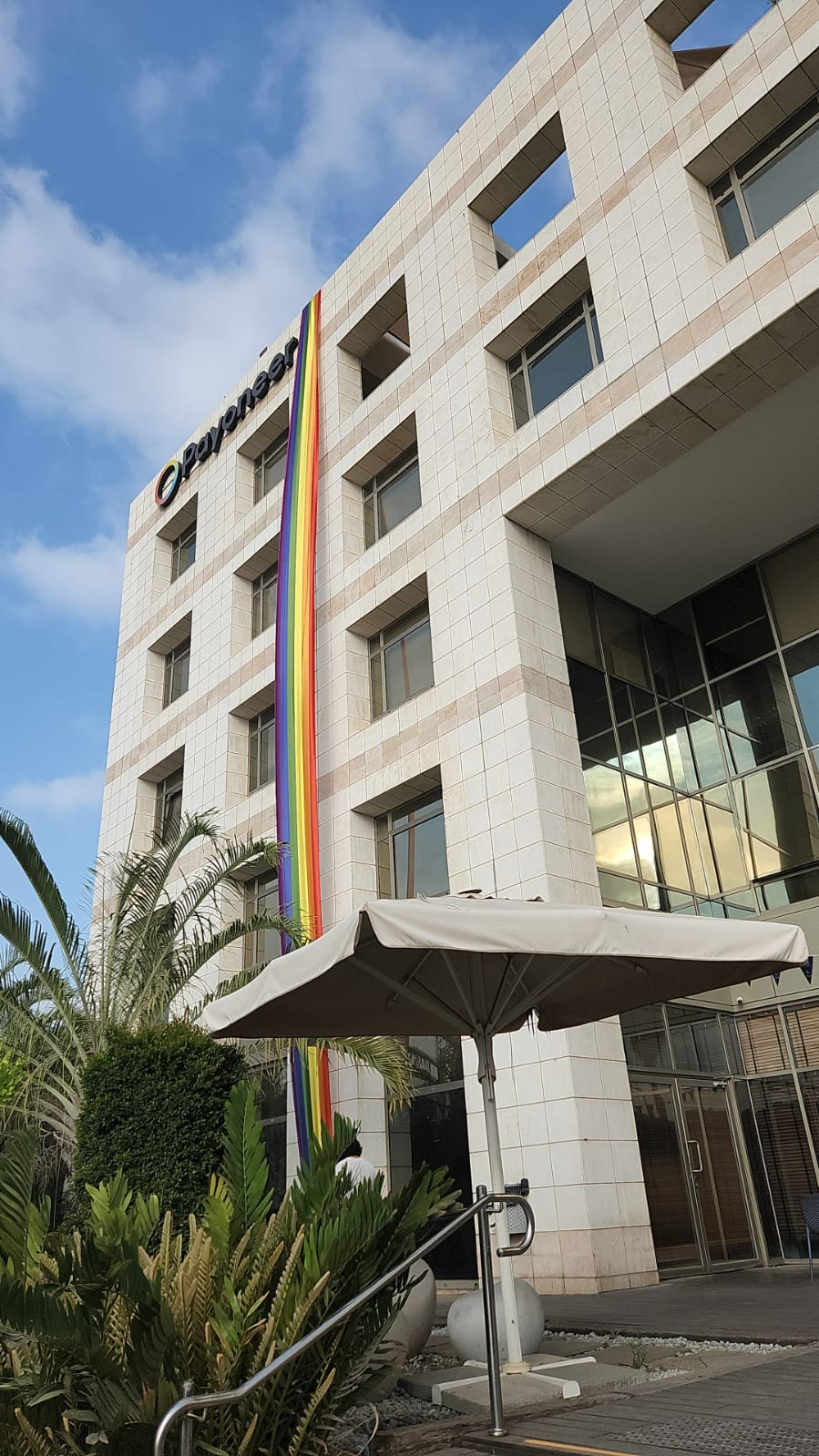
- Headquarters in Petach Tikva, Israel
- Type: Public
- Traded as: Nasdaq: PAYO; S&P 600 component
- Founded: 2005; 21 years ago
- Founder: Yuval Tal
- Headquarters: New York City, U.S.
- Key people: Keren Levy(president); Scott Galit (co-CEO); John Caplan(co-CEO); Arnon Kraft(COO)
- Services: Online payment, International money transfer
- Revenue: ▲US$473 million (2021)
- Operating income: ▼US$−30 million (2021)
- Net income: ▼US$−34 million (2021)
- Total assets: ▲US$5.08 billion (2021)
- Total equity: ▲US$487 million (2021)
- Number of employees: 1,871 (December 2021)
- Website: Payoneer.com

Payoneer Global Inc. is an American financial services company that provides online money transfer and digital payment services, and offers customers working capital.

== History ==
Payoneer was founded in 2005 with $2 million in seed funding from founder and then-CEO Yuval Tal and other private investors. 83North (Greylock Israel) led an additional $4 million in funding in 2007, with additional investors including Carmel Ventures, Crossbar Capital, Ping An, Wellington Management, Susquehanna Growth Equity, Naftali Bennett and Nyca Partners. Since 2005 Payoneer has raised over $265 million from investors.

In March 2016, the firm acquired internet escrow company Armor Payments. aiming to address the market for B2B transactions between US$500 and $1,000,000 where credit cards and letters of credit are not suitable. It also began working with the Latin American eCommerce site Linio.

In August 2016, the firm added an automated tax form service to its mass payout offering. In October 2016, the company raised $180 million from Technology Crossover Ventures, bringing the total funding to $234 million.

In 2017, China Broadband Capital (CBC) invested in Payoneer. In 2017 and 2018, Payoneer was named as CNBC's 40th and 13th most disruptive companies, respectively. In 2018, former chief economist of Israel, Yoel Naveh, joined the company to lead Payoneer's working capital division.

Payoneer launched a capital advance service in February 2019. In 2019, Payoneer got an authorisation as an Electronic Money Institution by Central Bank of Ireland for customers in EEU.In 2019, Payoneer hired FT Partners to help facilitate expansion of the company and secure an additional round of private funding. In December 2019, Payoneer acquired Optile, a German payments orchestration platform. The acquisition allows Payoneer, for the first time, to offer merchant services and consumer payment acceptance in addition to the B2B services they have been providing since inception. Optile will continue to operate as an independent group based out of their current HQ in Munich while also working for Payoneer.

Since 6 January 2021, Wirecard EUR receiving accounts on Payoneer can only receive payments from approved payment sources. Wirecard AG is insolvent since 25 June 2020 but the EUR receiving account is supported by their subsidiary Wirecard Bank AG, which is not part of the insolvency proceedings. Users have the ability to receive payments from other sources by requesting a Citibank EUR receiving account. In February 2021, Payoneer announced that it will become a publicly traded company through a merger with FTAC Olympus Acquisition Corp. (NASDAQ: FTOCU), a Special Purpose Acquisition Company (SPAC) owned by former Bancorp CEO Betsy Z. Cohen. The combined company will operate as Payoneer and have an implied estimated enterprise value of approximately $3.3 billion at closing, with $300 million coming from private investment in public equity (PIPE) from investors including Dragoneer Investment Group, Fidelity Management & Research, and Franklin Templeton. The company went public on the NASDAQ stock exchange on 28 June 2021.

In May 2022, the company began to offer Payoneer Checkout, a service which enables merchants to work with direct-to-customer (DTC) online stores.

In August 2023, it was announced that Payoneer had acquired the Israel-based AI data platform, Spott, for an undisclosed sum.

In August 2024, Payoneer acquired Skuad, a Singapore-based payroll and HR platform, for $61 million.

In April 2025, Payoneer acquired Easylink Payment Co., a Chinese online payment services provider, for an undisclosed sum.

== Services ==
Account holders can send and receive funds using an e-wallet, a virtual bank account number in a local currency or a re-loadable prepaid MasterCard debit card. Money received can then be withdrawn to a bank account or used online / at points of sale with the Payoneer debit card.

The company offer cross-border payments in more than 150 local currencies, using international wire transfers, online payments, and refillable debit card services.

Payoneer lists Airbnb, Google, Upwork and eCommerce marketplaces such as Rakuten, freelance marketplaces such as Fiverr and Envato, as their customers. They also work with ad networks to connect these firms with publishers based outside of their headquartered country.

In the content creation space, Payoneer works with Getty Images, and Pond5.

In October 2019, the company launched a service aimed for small and medium-sized businesses to send payments anywhere in the world.

== Business ==
The company is headquartered in New York City. As of 2019, the company employed approximately 1,200 people, and served over 4 million customers. In 2019 the company was valued at over $1 billion.

In order to lawfully remit money within the European Single Market, Payoneer was registered with the Gibraltar Financial Services Commission until Brexit, when it moved to Ireland.

== Global reach ==
=== Philippines ===
In 2009, Payoneer became available for use in the Philippines.

=== South Korea ===
Payoneer partnered with the South Korean online B2B marketplace EC21. In 2017, the company released an Integrated Payments API for SaaS providers to link cross-border B2B payments across cloud platforms. In 2018 the company opened an office in Seoul.

=== Britain/EU ===
In June 2017, the company opened an office in London.

=== Ukraine ===
The company partners with several banks in Ukraine: PrivatBank,Alfa-Bank and Monobank.

=== India ===
The firm closed its services in the Indian market in 2011 due to certain directives enforced by the Reserve Bank of India (RBI). Payoneer re-entered the Indian market in 2016, after partnering with IndusInd Bank and receiving Central Bank's approval. The company customized its offerings for the Indian market, with special reporting systems and fund-transfer limits that comply with local rules. Payoneer was the first digital payment platform in India to provide customers with a Foreign Inward Remittance Certificate (FIRC) digitally, thereby simplifying the required business processes.

=== French Airbnb ===
Payoneer partnered with popular rental website Airbnb in November 2013. The arrangement allowed hosts to conveniently withdraw their earnings using their prepaid Payoneer debit cards. In December 2017, French authorities investigated the payment system, which allowed hosts to receive their payments directly without having to first be deposited in their bank accounts, which could lead to the possibility of tax avoidance. Airbnb agreed to withdraw the payment system in France.

== Research ==
Payoneer publishes reports on the global economy.

- E-Learning in the Wake of a Pandemic (2020)
- The State of Global Live Streaming in 2020
- Global Gig Economy Index (2019)
- Global Seller Index (2019)
- Annual freelancer report (2015, 2018, 2020)

== Violations ==
Between 2013 and 2018 Payoneer was involved in illegal transactions by evading OFAC sanctions and agreed to pay US$1.4 million to settle violations.
