= CyberSource =

American payment gateway

Cybersource
- Type: Payment Gateway
- Industry: Technology
- Founded: 1994; 32 years ago
- Headquarters: Foster City, California, United States
- Parent: Visa Inc.

Cybersource is an American payment gateway founded in 1994. Headquartered in Foster City, California, the company offers a suite of services for online payment processing, e-commerce payment processing, fraud management, and payment security services for merchants and financial institutions.

In November 2007, Cybersource acquired the U.S. small business payment services provider Authorize.net for $565 million. In July 2010, it was acquired by Visa Inc. for approximately US$2 billion, becoming a wholly owned subsidiary.

== History ==
CyberSource was founded in 1994 by William S. McKiernan. The company was created to provide online payment and fraud management services for medium and large-sized merchants. It initially launched software.net, an online software store, and built the payment infrastructure for its own e-commerce operations.

During the dot-com boom, CyberSource went public. The company commenced its initial public offering (IPO) on June 23, 1999, issuing 4 million shares of common stock at an offering price of $11 per share. The company was listed under the stock ticker CYBS.

In 2007, CyberSource announced its acquisition of Authorize.Net, a provider of payment solutions for small businesses, for $565 million. This move expanded CyberSource's market reach from its traditional base of mid-sized and enterprise customers to include small businesses.

In April 2010, Visa announced it would acquire Cybersource in a deal valued at about $2.0 billion ($26 per share). The acquisition was completed on July 21, 2010. According to the deal disclosures, at the time Cybersource processed approximately 25% of all U.S. eCommerce dollars.

Following the acquisition, Cybersource continued to operate under its brand as part of Visa's merchant services strategy. Cybersource's founder, William S. McKiernan, joined Visa as an Executive Advisor to help with the integration of the two companies, while Michael Walsh continued to lead Cybersource as its president and CEO.

== Services and products ==
Cybersource provides a comprehensive portfolio of solutions designed to simplify and automate payment operations. These services are delivered through a modular platform that allows businesses to customize their payment solutions. Its services include processing of card-not-present (CNP) transactions, tokenization, subscription and recurring billing, digital wallet integrations, multi-rail payment support and fraud analytics.

- Payment acceptance: Cybersource's global payment gateway enables merchants to accept a wide variety of payment methods, including credit and debit cards, digital wallets, and other regional payment types, across more than 190 countries and territories.
- Fraud and risk management: Its flagship solution “Decision Manager” utilizes insights from the vast number of transactions processed annually by Visa and Cybersource to help merchants identify and prevent fraudulent transactions.
- Payment security: Cybersource provides solutions to reduce the risks associated with the handling of sensitive payment data (such as tokenization) that also help merchants simplify their PCI DSS Compliance.
- Unified Commerce: This solution helps merchants support omnichannel retail, integrating online and in-person payment solutions. This includes solutions for mobile and point-of-sale (POS) transactions.

== See also ==
- List of on-line payment service providers
