= Feedzai =

Portuguese data science company

- Type: Private
- Industry: Financial technology, enterprise software
- Founded: 2011
- Headquarters: Coimbra, Portugal
- Area served: Worldwide
- Key people: Nuno Sebastião, CEO
- Products: Feedzai Enterprise, Feedzai Solutions
- Services: Artificial intelligence, machine learning, SaaS, big data analytics
- Number of employees: 500+
- Subsidiaries: Feedzai Lda (Portugal); Feedzai Inc. (USA); Feedzai PLC (UK)
- Website: feedzai.com

Feedzai is a data science company that develops real-time machine learning tools to identify fraudulent payment transactions and minimize risk in the financial services, retail, and e-commerce industries. The company has been classified as a unicorn startup since March 2021, after a Series D funding round pushed its value above $1 billion. In October 2025, Feedzai secured $75 million in a funding round that valued the company at more than $2 billion. New investors in the round were Lince Capital, Iberis Capital and Explorer Investments.

Feedzai is headquartered in Coimbra, Portugal. The company's U.S. headquarters is in San Mateo, California, in the Silicon Valley.

The company was founded in 2011 by Nuno Sebastião, Pedro Bizarro and Paulo Marques. The company first began selling its solutions for fraud detection and operational intelligence in Europe and later expanded to the United States in 2014. Feedzai later announced that it had acquired Demyst, a company whose platform helps banks manage access to external data sources used for identity verification.

The company has been selected by the ECB to provide the Fraud & Risk Management solution for the Digital Euro (together with Capgemini Germany).
