= Skrill =

E-commerce payment business

Skrill, a Paysafe company
- Type: Public company
- Industry: Online payments
- Founded: 27 July 2001; 25 years ago
- Headquarters: London, United Kingdom
- Area served: Worldwide
- Key people: Bruce Lowthers (CEO)
- Products: Payment gateway Digital wallet Prepaid card PSP; Cryptocurrencies; Money transfer
- Revenue: ▲US $1.496 billion (Paysafe’s FY 2022 revenue)
- Number of employees: 3,300
- Parent: Paysafe
- Website: skrill.com

Skrill is part of Paysafe Limited, a global payments platform. It is one of Paysafe's digital wallet brands and was established in 2001 to offer multiple online payment and money transfer services. The company facilitates multiple payment options including card payments, bank transfers and local payment methods. The funds in a Skrill account can then be used to pay merchants and other Skrill users or converted into cryptocurrency.

Skrill also has cross-border payments accessible to users via its remittance service. The service enables users to send money to a bank account overseas using their bank card.

In 2015, Skrill was acquired by Paysafe along with former competitor NETELLER and prepaid payment provider paysafecard.

== History ==
=== Early history (2001 to 2015) ===
Skrill, formerly known as Moneybookers, was founded in 2001 in the United Kingdom as a digital wallet provider. By 2007, it had become established as one of the top three e-payment solution providers in Europe when it was purchased by Investcorp in March of that year. In August 2010, Skrill, operating under the name Moneybrookers, blocked a donation account operated by WikiLeaks citing the organisation's addition to Australian blacklists and American watchlists. In September 2011, Moneybookers announced that they would rebrand their service as Skrill, completing the rebrand in 2013. As Skrill, they completed the acquisition of Austrian-based prepaid payment method paysafecard in February 2013, before being acquired by CVC Capital Partners for €600 million in August 2013.

In 2009, Skrill, then known as Moneybookers, suffered a large security breach which exposed the data of almost 4.5 million customers. The breach was not discovered until October 2015 and included names, e-mail addresses, home addresses and IP addresses.

=== Paysafe subsidiary (2015 onwards) ===
In 2015, Skrill was acquired by Optimal Payments, the parent company of rival digital wallet NETELLER, for €1.1 billion. During this period, Skrill Group announced in April 2015 that it had completed the acquisition of Ukash, a UK-based competitor of paysafecard, which was merged during the same year. In November 2015, Optimal Payments rebranded as Paysafe.

In 2018, Skrill began to extend the amount of services offered to its users, launching an international money transfer service in February 2018, and a crypto service in July 2018 allowing users to buy and trade cryptocurrencies. This was followed by the launch of Skrill's customer loyalty programme, KNECT, in November 2019 and the extension of the international money transfer service to US users in June 2020.

=== Sponsorship and relationships ===
In 2011, Skrill first sponsored the PokerStars owned European Poker Tour for its eighth season, sponsoring the event again in 2013 for its tenth season.

In July 2013, English football's National League signed a one-year sponsorship deal with Skrill with the Conference's divisions being known as The Skrill Premier, The Skrill North and The Skrill South.

In May 2020, Skrill announced a four-year AC Milan sponsorship deal.

In March 2021, Skrill announced a new partnership with the English Premier League football team Leeds United.
