= Merchant account =

Type of business bank account for accepting payments

A merchant account is a type of bank account that allows a seller, known as the merchant, to accept payments by debit or credit cards. A merchant account is established under an agreement between an acceptor and a merchant acquiring bank for the settlement of payment card transactions. In some cases a payment processor, payment service provider, independent sales organization (ISO), or member service provider (MSP) is also a party to the merchant agreement and can act as middle man between the merchant and the bank.

Whether a merchant enters into a merchant agreement directly with an acquiring bank or through an aggregator, the agreement contractually binds the merchant to obey the operating regulations established by the card associations.

A high-risk merchant account is a business account or merchant account that allows the business to accept online payments though they are considered to be of high-risk nature by the banks and credit card processors. They will typically pay higher transactions fees if they are accepted at all. The industries that possess this account are adult industry, travel, Forex trading business, gambling, and multilevel marketing businesses. "High-Risk" is the term that is used by the acquiring banks to signify industries or merchants that are involved with the higher financial risk.

== History ==
Since credit cards were developed in the 1960s, the earliest methods, submitting credit card slips to a merchant processing bank by mail, or by accessing an Automated Response Unit (ARU) by telephone, were initially used but have long been overshadowed by electronic devices. These early methods used two-part forms and a manual device for mechanically imprinting the embossed card number information onto the forms. This was done by a merchant imprinting their customer's card with a credit card imprinter to create a customer receipt and merchant copy. These copies would be taken to the merchant acquiring bank for processing.

== Methods of processing credit cards ==
Credit and debit card transactions are sent electronically to merchant processing banks or payment service provider for authorization, capture and deposit. Various methods exist for presenting a credit card sale to "the system." In all circumstances either the entire magnetic strip is read by a swipe through a credit card terminal/card reader, a computer chip is read (an "EMV") or is captured using near field communication (NFC) technology or is entered into a website.

=== Credit card terminal ===
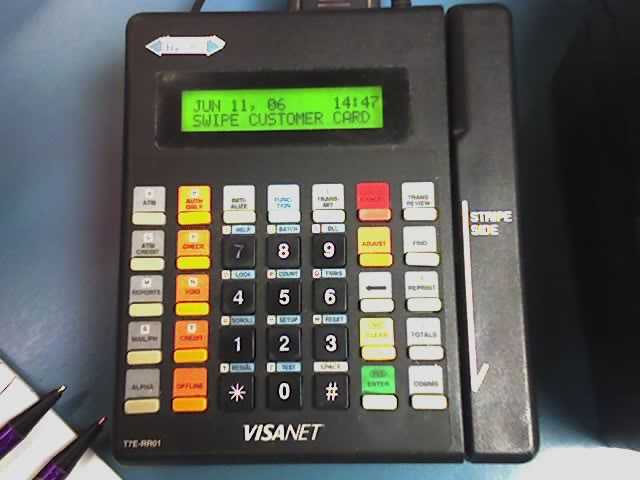
A typical credit card terminal popular in 2005, now typically out of use and of a style/era usually non-compliant per PCI-DSS standards.

A credit card terminal is a stand-alone piece of electronic equipment that allows a merchant to swipe or key-enter a credit card's information as well as additional information required to process a credit card transaction. They may be connected to Point of Sale systems and typically have a keypad and network connection and may have a built-in printer.

=== Automated response unit (ARU) ===
An ARU (also known as a voice authorization, capture and deposit) allows the manual keyed entry and subsequent authorization of a credit card over a cellular or land-line telephone. With this method, a merchant typically imprints their customer's card with an credit card imprinter to create a customer receipt and merchant copy, then process the transaction instantaneously over the phone.

=== Payment gateway ===
A payment gateway is an e-commerce service that authorizes payments for e-businesses and online retailers. It is the equivalent of a physical POS (point-of-sale) terminal located in most retail outlets. A merchant account provider is typically a separate company from the payment gateway. Some merchant account providers have their own payment gateways but the majority of companies use 3rd party payment gateways. The gateway usually has 2 components: a) the virtual terminal that can allow for a merchant to securely login and key in credit card numbers or b) have the website's shopping-cart connect to the gateway via an API to allow for real-time processing from the merchant's website.

== Level 2 or level 3 processing – purchasing cards ==
For business-to-business (B2B) and business-to-government (B2G) purchases, these interchange fees fall into one of 3 processing categories — Level 1, Level 2, or Level 3. Level 1 has the highest rates. Level 3 has the lowest rates. Level 3 detail refers to passing line-item detail; information generally found on an invoice; PO number descriptions, quantities….other details, level 2 refers to passing tax amount along with invoice/PO#. Both Visa and MasterCard apply higher interchange rates for commercial transactions that are accepted w/o level 3 detail. These are applied to the interchange before a processor adds their fee and range from .80%-1.5%

When set up for level 3 processing transactions over $5,984.61 government, $8725 non-government, are eligible for high ticket interchange rates. Interchange varies from .50-1.45% depending on the type of card and size of the ticket.

== Merchant account marketing ==
Merchant accounts are marketed to merchants by two basic methods: either directly by the processor or sponsoring bank or by an authorized agent for the bank and additionally directly registered with both Visa and MasterCard as an ISO/MSP (independent selling organization/member service provider (MSP).

Marketing details are by card issuers like Visa and MasterCard and are enforced by various rules and fines. A few of the largest processors also partner with warehouse clubs to promote merchant accounts to their business member

=== Marketing by banks ===
A bank that has a merchant processing relationship with Visa and MasterCard, also known as a member bank, can issue merchant accounts directly to merchants.

To reduce risk, some banks limit approval to merchants in their geographical area, those with a physical retail storefront, or those that have been in business for two years or more.

=== Marketing by independent sales organizations (ISO)/MSPs ===
To market merchant accounts, an ISO/MSP must be sponsored by a member bank. This sponsorship requires that the bank verify the financial stability and suitability of the company that will be marketing on its behalf. The ISO/MSP must also pay a fee to be registered with Visa and MasterCard and must comply with regulations in how they may market merchant accounts and the use of trademarks of Visa and MasterCard. One way to verify if an ISO/MSP is in compliance is to check a website or any other marketing material for a disclosure "company is a registered ISO/MSP of bank, town, state. FDIC insured".

This disclosure is required by both Visa and MasterCard and will cause a penalty of up to $25,000 if it is not clearly visible. In almost all cases, if there is no disclosure, the company is likely to be an uninformed fourth party or worse.

== Rates and fees ==
A merchant account has a variety of fees, some periodic, others charged on a per-item or percentage basis. Some fees are set by the merchant account provider, but the majority of the per-item and percentage fees are passed through the merchant account provider to the credit card issuing bank according to a schedule of rates called interchange fees, which are set by Visa, Discover, and MasterCard. Interchange fees vary depending on card type and the circumstances of the transaction. For example, if a transaction is made by swiping a card through a credit card terminal it will be in a different category than if it were keyed in manually.

=== Discount rates ===
The discount rate comprises a number of dues, fees, assessments, network charges and mark-ups merchants are required to pay for accepting credit and debit cards, the largest of which by far is the interchange fee. Each bank or ISO/MSP has real costs in addition to the wholesale interchange fees and creates profit by adding a mark-up to all the fees mentioned above. There are a number of price models banks and ISOs/MSPs used to bill merchants for the services rendered. Here are the more popular price models:

==== Three-tier pricing ====
The three-tier pricing is the most popular pricing method and the simplest system for most merchants to understand, if not the most transparent. The newer six-tier pricing, including additional tiers covering debit, business, or international cards is gaining in popularity. In three-tier pricing, the merchant account provider groups the transactions into three groups (tiers) and assigns a rate to each tier based on a criterion established for each tier. A possible drawback from the merchant's perspective is that these "tiers" or "buckets" are variable from one processor to the next prohibiting any direct comparison from a tier-one provided by one provider to a tier-one provided by another provider.

===== First tier – qualified rate =====
A qualified rate is the percentage rate a merchant will be charged whenever they accept a regular consumer credit card and process it in a manner defined as "standard" by their merchant account provider using an approved credit card processing solution. This is usually the lowest rate a merchant will incur when accepting a credit card. The qualified rate is also the rate commonly quoted to a merchant when they inquire about pricing.

The qualified rate is created based on the way a merchant will be accepting a majority of their credit cards. For example, for an Internet merchant, the Internet interchange categories will be defined as qualified, while for a physical retailer only transactions swiped through or read by their terminal in an ordinary manner will be defined as qualified.

===== Second tier – mid-qualified rate =====
Also known as a partially qualified rate, the mid-qualified rate is the percentage rate a merchant will be charged whenever they accept a credit card that does not qualify for the lowest rate (the qualified rate). This may happen for several reasons such as:

- A consumer credit card is keyed into a credit card terminal instead of being swiped
- A special kind of credit card is used like a rewards card or a business card

A mid-qualified rate is higher than a qualified rate. Some of the transactions that are usually grouped into the mid-qualified tier can cost the provider more in interchange costs, so the merchant account providers do make a markup on these rates.

The use of "rewards cards" can be as high as 40% of transactions. So it is important that the financial impact of this fee be understood.

===== Third tier – non-qualified rate =====
The non-qualified rate is usually the highest percentage rate a merchant will be charged whenever they accept a credit card. In most cases, all transactions that are not qualified or mid-qualified will fall to this rate. This may happen for several reasons such as:

- A consumer credit card is keyed into a credit card terminal instead of being swiped and address verification is not performed
- A special kind of credit card is used like a business card and all required fields are not entered
- A merchant does not settle their daily batch within the allotted time frame, usually past 48 hours from the time of authorization.

A non-qualified rate can be significantly higher than a qualified rate and can cost the provider much more in interchange costs, so the merchant account providers do make a markup on these rates.

==== Six-tier pricing ====
As a result of the Walmart Settlement and to compete against PIN-based debit cards (which are processed outside of the Visa and MasterCard networks), Visa and MasterCard lowered the interchange rates for debit cards well below those for credit cards. Some providers can pass on the lower cost of these cards directly to merchants. Consequently, the three tiers programs have added two classifications for debit cards that are processed without a PIN or with a PIN for a total of six rate classifications.

==== Interchange-plus pricing ====
Some providers offer merchant account services priced on an "interchange plus" basis. These accounts are based on the "interchange" tables published by both Visa and MasterCard MasterCard. This type of pricing creates a discount rate by adding interchange rates plus a percentage and authorization fees. This is a common pricing model for very low and very high-average tickets.

=== Authorization fee ===
The authorization fee (actually an authorization request fee) is charged each time a transaction is sent to the card-issuing bank to be authorized. The fee applies whether or not the request is approved. Note this is not the same as a transaction fee.

=== Transaction fee ===
The transaction fee is charged when you accept your authorization. This fee only applies to an authorization that is accepted without error.

=== Statement fee ===
The statement fee is a monthly fee associated with the monthly statement that is sent to the merchant at the end of each monthly processing cycle. This statement shows how much processing was done by the merchant during the month and what fees were incurred as a result.

Many times, the statement fee is not directly linked to "paper" statements but rather general overhead. This means that a provider would not waive this fee if a merchant chose to have a "paperless" statement.

=== Monthly minimum fee ===
The monthly minimum fee is a way to ensure that merchants pay a minimum amount in fees each month to cover costs from the provider to maintain the account. If a merchant's fees do not equal or exceed the monthly minimum they will be charged the difference up to the monthly minimum.

Example: A merchant has signed a contract with a $25.00 monthly minimum fee. If all the fees (clarity: this is only for processing costs, so it does not include monthly fees, chargeback fees, etc.) for the most recent month of processing total only $15.00, this merchant will be charged an additional $10.00 to meet their monthly minimum requirements. Sometimes there are fees that are charged that are not a part of the monthly minimum, such as statement fees. It is industry standard to charge a monthly minimum, though not all acquirers charge this, nor do all that do charge it for every agreement.

=== Batch fee ===
A batch fee (also known as a batch-header fee) can be charged to a merchant whenever the merchant "settles" their terminal. Settling a terminal, also known as "batching", is when a merchant sends their completed transactions for the day to their acquiring bank for payment. Some providers perform this automatically. It is important to close a batch every 24 hours or a higher rate will be assessed by Visa, Discover or MasterCard. The term "batch header" originally came from the processing pre-electronic terminal era, when each batch of credit card receipts was turned into the merchant's local bank for deposit. The batch header was a mini-report summarizing those receipts bundled within.

=== Customer service fee ===
The customer service fee (also known as a maintenance fee) can be charged by some providers to pay for the cost of customer service. Also referred to as a "merchant support fee", "customer support fee", or simply, "service fee" by some merchant providers.

=== Annual fee ===
The annual fee can be charged by some providers to pay for the costs of maintaining the merchant's account. Sometimes these fees can be quarterly. The fee can be from $79–$399. These fees in cases include a Payment Card Industry (PCI) compliance fee, which may include a cyber/breach insurance policy.

=== Early termination fee ===
The early termination fee can be charged by some providers if the merchant ends the contract before the end of the contract term. While contract terms of one-to-three years are typical, some providers have terms of up to five years with a one-year prior notice to cancel or the fee will be assessed. Some providers also assess all statement fees and monthly minimums remaining when the contract is terminated. Some providers may also assess a "lost profit" fee based on an assumption of profits they concluded they would have earned during the full term of the contract.

=== Chargeback fee ===
Chargebacks are the largest risk that is presented to banks and providers. This is not to be confused with refunds, which are simply a merchant refunding a transaction. In the Visa, Discover, and MasterCard rules, the merchant's processing bank is 100% responsible for all the transactions that the merchant performs. This can leave the provider open to millions of dollars of potential losses if the merchant operates in an illegal or risky manner and generates many chargebacks. The providers pass this cost on to the merchant, but if the merchant is fraudulent or simply does not have the money, the provider must pay all the costs to make the cardholder 'whole'. The chargeback risk is the largest part taken into consideration during the contract application and underwriting process. Some banks are much more stringent than others when assessing a merchant's chargeback risk.

If a merchant encounters a chargeback they may be assessed a fee by their acquiring bank. A potential chargeback is presented on behalf of the card holder's bank to the merchant's credit card processing bank.

Currently, both Visa and MasterCard require all merchants to maintain no more than 1% of dollar volume processed to be chargebacks. If the percentage goes above, there are penalties starting at $5,000 – $25,000 charged to the merchant's processing bank and ultimately passed on to the merchant.

In all cases, a chargeback will cost the merchant a chargeback fee, typically $15–$30, plus the cost of the transaction and the amount processed.

=== The Durbin Amendment ===
On October 1, 2011, new rules, resulting from the Durbin Amendment, went into effect that lower the debit card interchange fees the Visa and MasterCard networks charge merchants. The new rules apply only to debit cards issued by banks with more than $10 billion in total assets.

Prior to the implementation of the Durbin Amendment, the swipe fee for a debit card transaction averaged 44 cents. Under Durbin, the Federal Reserve has set a cap of .05% + 21 cents per transaction (22 cents if the card has security features).

== See also ==
- Billing descriptor
- Merchant services
- Payment terminal
- Payment gateway
- Interchange fee
- Credit card fraud
- Chargeback insurance
- Payment card industry (PCI)
- Cardholder Information Security Program (CISP)
- Terminated merchant file
