= Comgate =

Czech payment services provider

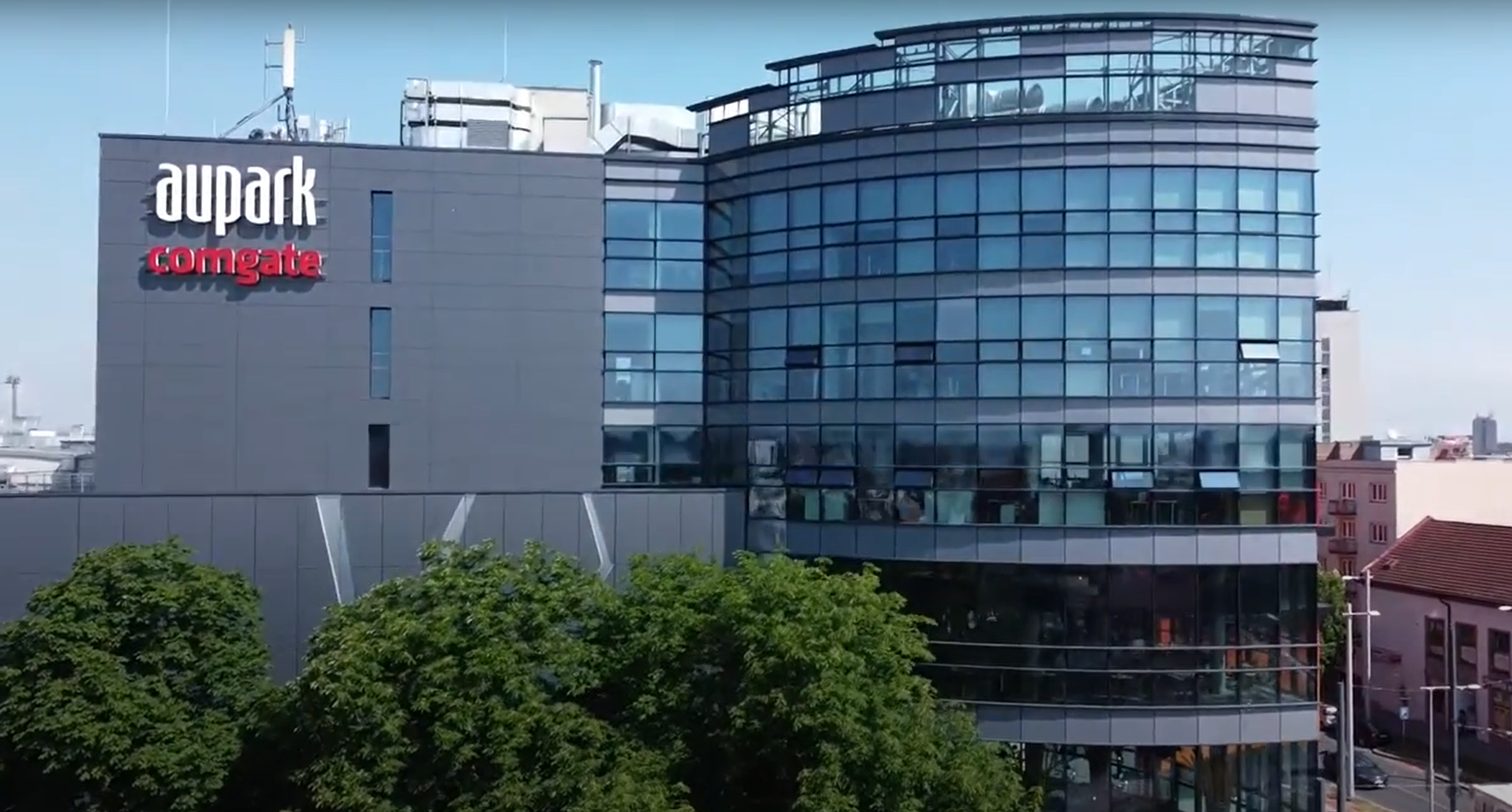
- Company headquarters
- Company type: Private Joint-stock company
- Industry: Payment services
- Founded: 2000; 26 years ago
- Founder: Nikolaj Šťáhlavský
- Headquarters: Hradec Králové, Czech Republic
- Key people: Jakub Ouhrabka, CEO
- Products: Payment gateway, payment terminals, and merchant cash loan
- Total equity: CZK616,636,000 (2023)
- Owner: Nikolaj Šťáhlavský, Jakub Ouhrabka
- Number of employees: 80 (2026)
- Website: www.comgate.eu

Comgate is a payment service provider (PSP) offering payment gateways for e-shops, and payment terminals for physical stores. It operates in the Czech Republic, Slovakia, Poland, Hungary, Romania and other countries based on a European Payment Institution license registered with the Czech National Bank. As of January 2026, its payment system is used by more than 21,000 merchants and processes over CZK 53 billion in transactions annually.

Comgate is a non-bank acquirer, i.e., a direct business partner of Visa and Mastercard. It meets PCI DSS Level 1 security certification. This means adherence to a set of requirements for the security of the data being processed, access to the data, and the development of the system.

In addition to payment services, Comgate offers business loans to its clients. Sister company Shipmall provides fulfillment services to online stores.

== History ==
In 2000, students Nikolaj Šťáhlavský and Michal Rychna founded SmartNET, s.r.o., which created mobile versions of websites. Of the original founders, Nikolaj Šťáhlavský remained the majority shareholder in the company. In 2002, the company changed its name to Comgate and was transformed into a joint stock company. The service offering was expanded to include a real-time consumer contest data processing platform. It began to operate high-capacity connectors to mobile operators, enabling the processing of regular and premium SMS, and to offer payment processing services via premium SMS.

In 2010, Comgate obtained a license for payment services from the Czech National Bank and started to mediate card payments on the Internet. In 2016, the CNB expanded the license to Payment Institution, which allows the company to process unlimited volumes of transactions throughout the EU. In 2017, the license was expanded to include registration with the National Bank of Slovakia. In 2017, Jakub Ouhrabka, who joined the company in 2000 as head of development, later became a shareholder of the company, became the company's CEO. In 2018, Comgate divested its communications division to the multinational company Comdata.

Comgate added payment terminals to its payment gateway in 2019, and achieved PCI DSS Level 1 certification in 2020. The Comgate payment gateway added other payment methods such as online bank transfers to card payments, and in 2021, deferred payments, known as BNPL.

In 2022, the range of services was expanded to include a business loan available online. In 2023, Comgate gained acquirer status with a direct link to Visa and Mastercard. In 2024, the company expanded its payment registration with the Czech National Bank and national banks in other countries - Hungary, Poland, Bulgaria, Romania, Croatia, Austria and Germany.

== Products ==
The company provides two main payment products:

- A Comgate payment gateway is a software solution that allows an online stores to accept payments from customers through various payment methods. It therefore aggregates the connection between the e-shop and card associations, banks or BNPL providers. The merchant is charged transaction fees for operating the payment gateway.
- A Comgate payment terminal that allows merchants to accept non-cash payments by various methods physically at the point of sale (POS). The company offers a Nexgo N5 terminal. The merchant is charged transaction fees for operating the terminal.
