= TMF =

TMF may refer to:

- Terminated merchant file, a type of payment system
- The Music Factory, an originally Dutch brand of pop music television channels, including:
  - TMF Nederland
  - TMF Flanders
  - TMF Australia, now known as MTV Hits
  - TMF (UK & Ireland)
  - TMF Awards
- TMF Group, a Dutch multinational in the accounting industry
- Topological modular forms, an E-infinity ring spectrum used in algebraic topology
- Tour du Massif de Fontainebleau, a hiking trail in northern France
- TeleManagement Forum
- Theoretical and Mathematical Physics, scientific journal
- The Magnetic Fields, an indie pop band led by Stephin Merritt
- Thermo-mechanical fatigue
- Texas Military Forces
- Trial master file, for regulatory compliance in clinical trials
- Trey Martinez Fischer, a Texas politician from San Antonio
- Thomas Munson Foundation, a genealogical organization for the descendants of Thomas Volney Munson
- TrackMania Forever
