= Leslie Fritz =

Hungarian-Australian entrepreneur (1911–2006)

Leslie Fritz (14 March 1911 – 11 December 2006) was a Hungarian-born Australian entrepreneur and founder of the Southern Highlands wine industry.

== Biography ==
Leslie Fritz was born in Arad, Hungary to a Hungarian noble family. He settled in Australia in 1962. An entrepreneur, he co-founded Hypercom, an Australian-born American electronic payment processing hardware and software company which was floated on the New York Stock Exchange in 1997, becoming the largest technology company in Australia's history to that date. He was also a pioneer in the Australian wine industry of the Southern Highlands. In 1983, he purchased Brigadoon, a small holding in the Southern Highlands, where he experimented with Hungarian grape varieties. In 1987, he purchased Eling Forest, a much larger property (400 acres), co-founded Joadja Winery, the first winery in the Southern Highlands, with Kim Moginie, and established the Eling Forest Vineyard and Winery.

== Honors ==
The "Leslie Fritz trophy for best Riesling" is an award presented at the Australian Highlands Wine Show.
