= Dankort =

National debit card of Denmark

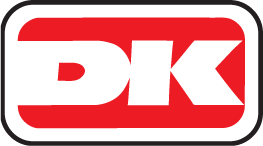
The Dankort logo

The Dankort is the national debit card of Denmark. Today, it is often combined with a Visa or Mastercard (depending on issuing institution) and functions as a Visa or Mastercard debit card abroad and in stores that do not accept Dankort.

== History ==
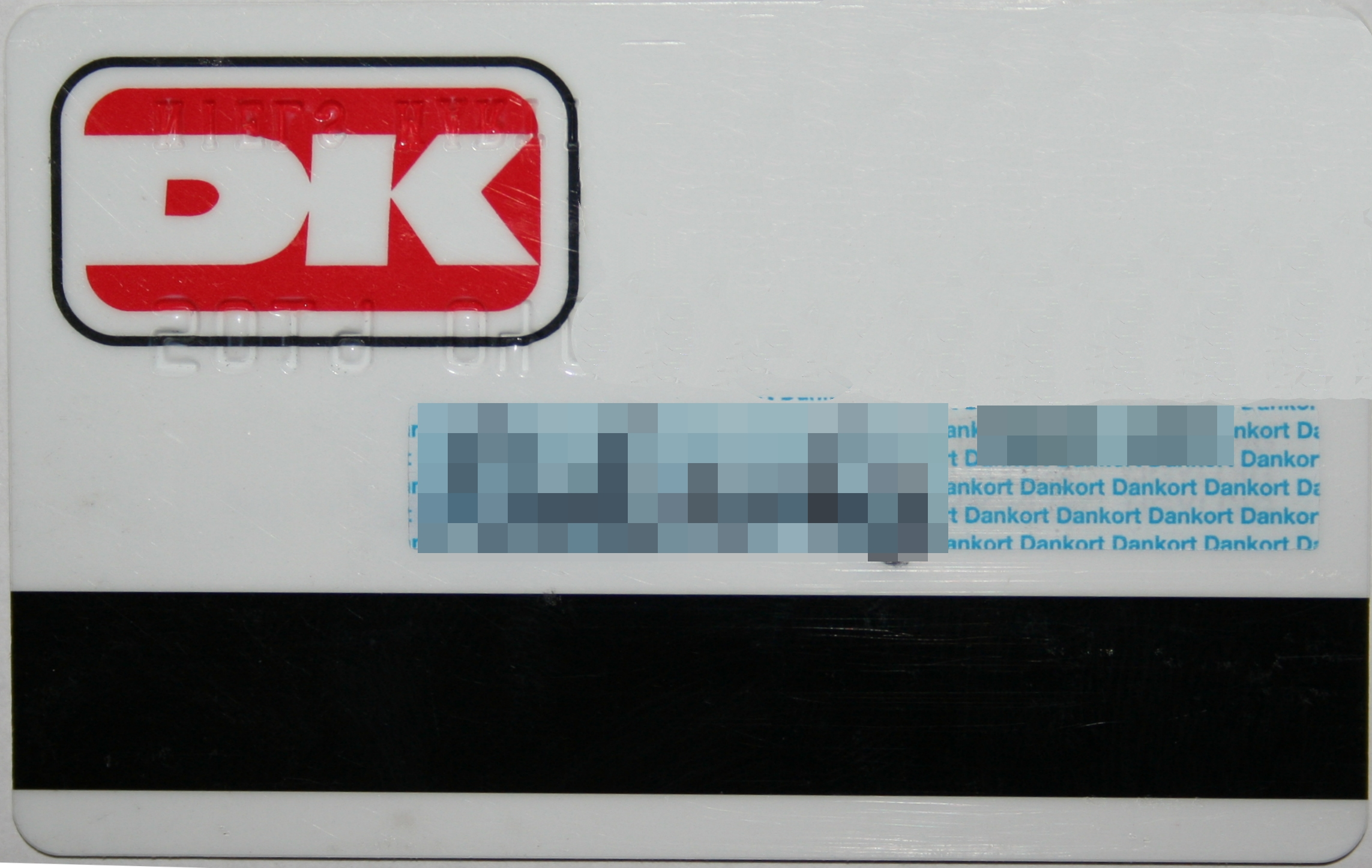
Back of a Dankort issued by Lån & Spar Bank

The first Dankort was issued by Pengeinstitutternes Købe- og Kreditkort in September 1983. In its very early years, Dankort transactions were processed mainly using Dankort-branded imprinters, until the first electronic Dankort POS terminals were introduced in 1985. The first Dankort magnetic stripe cards were issued in 1984, and in the same year Dankort card holders were able to withdraw money from "Kontanten" ATMs.

In 2004 the Dankort technology was upgraded from being simply a magnetic stripe card, to a hybrid card with both the magnetic strip and an embedded chip. This was to improve security by making it harder to clone a card and also to add more room for extra information on the card. However the card holder's picture was removed from the card to make room for the chip (which was already crowded with a lot of information, along with logos of Dankort, Visa, and so on), making the merchant no longer able to do a photo identification of the card holder.

In the beginning of 2005 the Danish banks introduced a 50 øre per transaction fee for using a Dankort card. The instatement of this fee was questioned by Danish politicians, merchants, and cardholders. The law was subsequently changed, converting the per transaction fee to a fixed annual payment to be paid by the merchant, the amount depending on the number of transactions ( 4,999 or less; 5,000–19,999; 20,000+). Further thresholds were later introduced into the system, allowing greater differentiation between merchants. Danish law was changed effective July 2005, converting the payment per transaction paid by the merchants, to a fixed annual amount depending on the number of transactions. Merchants are not allowed to pass this fee on to the consumer wishing to pay with a Dankort.

Since 15 January 2006, all payment agreements for Dankort have been administered by Nets A/S (formerly Payment Business Services and before that Pengeinstitutternes BetalingsSystemer).

Danish law distinguishes between varying types of debit cards and credit cards.

Due to the higher fees charged by banks for the use of non-Danish issued cards (that consist of foreign card network interchange fees plus Danish banks' own fees), many Danish merchants only accept Dankort and Danish-issued credit cards, but not foreign cards. Some merchants might not even accept cards with foreign brands (such as Visa, Mastercard, and so on) since these cards were identified as foreign cards by the merchants, even if they are Danish-issued. In the past they used to charge an extra fee for these cards, but this is now against EU law (Payment Services Directive).

Co-branded Dankort-Visa and Dankort/Mastercard cards are very common in Denmark and do not carry the bigger fee, as Danish merchants treat them as regular Dankort cards within Denmark. Danish holders of Dankort-Visa and Dankort/Mastercard are normally able to use these cards globally, wherever Visa or Mastercard is accepted and the fee for accepting a foreign Visa/Mastercard card isn't too high that a merchant will deny the use of a foreign Visa/Mastercard card.
