= Smart terminal =

Smart terminal may refer to:

- Block-oriented terminal, which typically offloads form or panel editing from a mainframe computer
- A computer terminal with capabilities for cursor positioning, or other display formatting capabilities beyond a text-mode teleprinter
- A credit card terminal which supports various payment methods
- Thin client computer, with local data processing capacity
