= PAX Technology =

Chinese manufacturer of point of sale hardware and software

PAX Technology Inc.
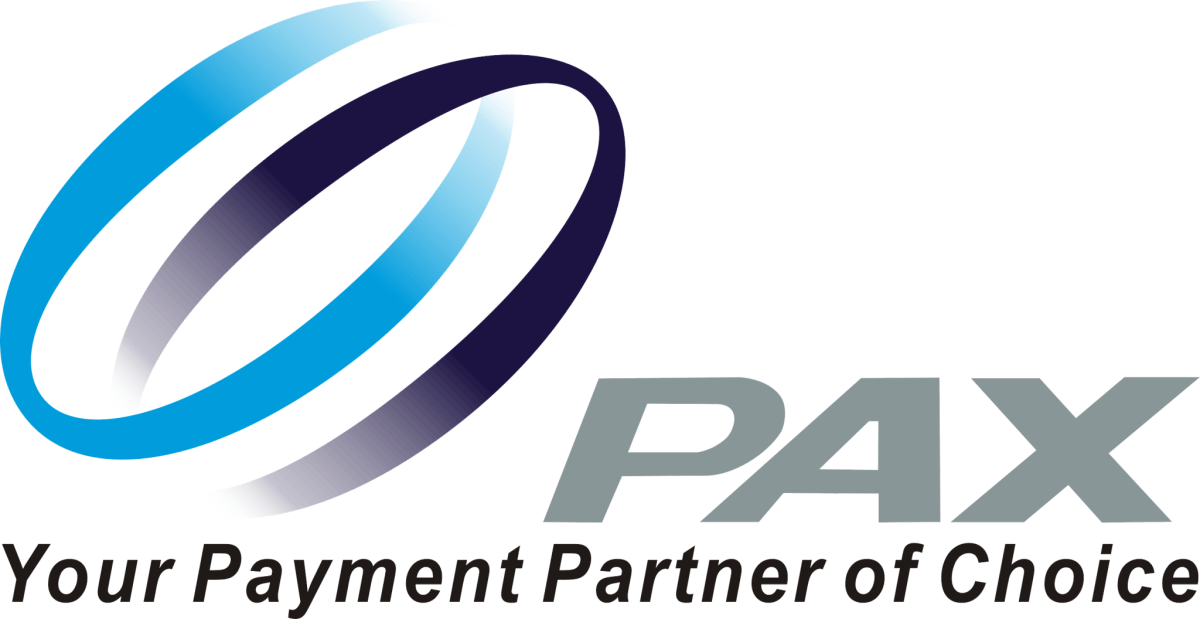
- Type: Public
- Traded as: SEHK: 327
- Industry: Financial services
- Founded: 2000; 26 years ago
- Headquarters: Shenzhen, Guangdong, China
- Key people: Nie Guoming (Chairman) & (CEO)
- Products: Point of sale, Payment terminals, PIN pads
- Revenue: US$563M
- Number of employees: 1800 (2018)
- Website: www.pax.com.cn

PAX Technology is a Chinese manufacturer of payment terminals, PIN pads, and point of sale hardware and software. The company is headquartered in Shenzhen, listed on the Hong Kong Stock Exchange and sells its products globally.

== History ==
PAX Technology was founded in Shenzhen (China) in 2000. Tiger Nie is currently Group CEO and chairman of the board.

In 2002, PAX was selected as supplier of EFTPOS terminals for China UnionPay Merchant Services and supplier for Bank of China & Bank of Communications in 2004. In 2010, PAX was listed on the Hong Kong Stock Exchange.

In 2013, PAX was listed in Forbes Asia 200 Best Under A Billion Companies. In 2016, PAX announced a strategic partnership with Samsung to implement the Samsung Pay payment method in PAX payment terminals. Later the same year, PAX unveiled its first Android smart terminal.

As of October 2022, according to Nilson Report, PAX has become the second-largest global payment terminal provider.

=== Cybersecurity concerns ===
In October 2021, Worldpay, Inc., a subsidiary of FIS, began removing PAX point of sale products due to cybersecurity concerns.

=== Federal raid of U.S. offices ===
On October 26, 2021, it was reported that agents from the U.S. Federal Bureau of Investigation, Department of Homeland Security, and other federal officials raided the Jacksonville, Florida offices of PAX Technology. KrebsOnSecurity reported the raid was tied to reports that PAX's systems may have been involved in cyberattacks on U.S. and E.U. organizations. Following the raid, a senior executive in charge of PAX Technology's security resigned.

== See also ==
- Point of sale companies
