= James Schmidt =

James Schmidt may refer to:

- James Schmidt (politician)
- James Schmidt (philosopher)
- James Schmidt (serial killer)
