= Nexgo =

Chinese payment terminal manufacturer

NEXGO
- Company type: Public
- Traded as: SEHK: 300130
- Industry: Financial services
- Founded: 2001; 25 years ago
- Headquarters: Shenzhen, Guangdong, China
- Area served: Worldwide
- Key people: Yan Hong Cai (Director), Jing Lin Chen (Director), Jia He, PhD (Director)
- Products: Point of sale, payment terminals, PIN pads
- Revenue: $96.8M (as of 2020)
- Number of employees: 1850
- Website: www.nexgoglobal.com

NEXGO (also known as Shenzhen Xinguodu Technology Co., Ltd.) is a global manufacturer of high-tech payment terminals, PIN pads and point of sale hardware and software. The company is headquartered in Shenzhen, China, and engages in research and development, production, sale, and leasing of financial point of sale (POS) machines and related electronic payment processing products. Its business scope extends to various areas including electronic payment, biometric technology, intelligent hardware, credit services, audit services, blockchain technology, and big data services. NEXGO operates worldwide through a network of partners and has over 25 million point of sale terminals deployed in over 50 countries.

== History ==
NEXGO was founded in Shenzhen, China in 2001. In the same year company succeeded in developing the 1st generation wireless POS in China. In 2002, the company was designated by the State Encryption Management Commission as one of the general electronic payment scrambler instrument suppliers.

In 2004 the company launched the first color screen POS product in China. In 2006 NEXGO was selected by China UnionPay as one of the four international EFTPOS suppliers. In 2008, the company was recognized as one of Shenzhen's first national-level high-tech enterprises.

In 2009 the company released the first big screen multi-media POS terminal in China. Cooperated with American railway passenger company, and become the first Chinese POS manufacturer to enter American market. In October 2010 the company was officially listed on the Growth Enterprise Market with stock No.: 300130. In 2014, NEXGO released G3, which is the first wireless POS that passed PCI 4.0 in the world Xinguodu's GMB algorithm security POS project was included in the national high-tech industrial development project.

In 2016, the company launched the N5 Smart POS. In the same year, a significant development occurred with the establishment of NEXGO's first fully owned overseas subsidiary, Nexgo do Brasil Participações Ltda. Following this expansion, the company further extended its international presence by establishing subsidiaries in Dubai and the United States.

In 2018 Global Accelerex, licensed payment service provider in Nigeria unveiled NEXTGO N5 Smart POS as the first single unit Android Point of sale terminal to be certified for payment acceptance in Nigeria.

== See also ==
- Point of sale companies
