= BankCard Services =

American credit card processor

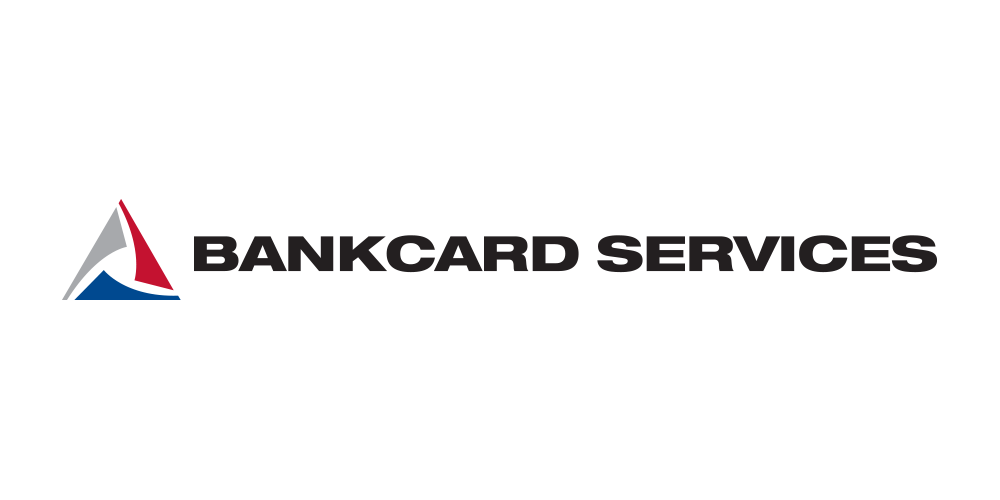
- Company type: Private company
- Industry: Payment services
- Founded: October 1987 in Los Angeles, California
- Founder: Patrick Hong
- Headquarters: 21281 Western Ave, Torrance, California, United States
- Number of locations: 12 Branch Offices (2020)
- Area served: United States
- Products: Payment terminals; Credit Card Processing; Payment; Website Building and Management; Online Ordering; Marketing and Loyalty Programs; Financial Loans; Digital Commerce
- Number of employees: 170 (2020)
- Subsidiaries: NAVYZ Total Business Solutions; MAP(Merchant Advance Pay); HommeFace; iOrderFoods.com; 2go2go.com

BankCard Services is an American credit card processor. It was founded in 1987 and is headquartered in Torrance, California, with 12 branch offices across the US and alliance partners in 22 states. BankCard Services is the world's 139st largest acquirer for merchant card processing based on volume of all purchase transaction (Visa, MasterCard, Union Pay, American Express, Discover, Diners Club, JCB, domestic debit and domestic credit) by country.

BankCard Services’ service mark, NAVYZ, provides point of sale (POS) systems, website builders, marketing and loyalty programs and financial loans for small businesses.

== History ==
The company was founded in 1987 in Los Angeles, California. In 2014 its service mark NAVYZ was established.
