= Virtual terminal (payment processing) =

A virtual terminal is a software application (often a web application) for merchants which allows them to accept payment with a payment card, specifically a credit card, without requiring the physical presence of the card (“card not present transaction”). They are called “virtual” terminals in contrast to the physical payment terminals used to process card payments when the payment card is present.

== Use of virtual terminals ==
When a customer wants to pay with a card over the phone, a virtual terminal allows the person accepting payment (such as a call center agent) to enter the customer's credit card details to process the payment. Unlike when using a regular payment terminal, the presence of the payment card is not required. The payment data is then automatically sent to the payment processor to handle the transaction.

While the physical card does not need to be presented to the merchant (which would be impossible over the phone), the customer authorising the payment should still be possess the card. To verify this, the virtual terminal often requires the card security code to be entered, which the customer must provide. One alternative for merchants is to utilise a credit card vault, allowing repeat customers to avoid providing this information over the phone. Some processors offer their merchants the option to securely store their customers' card information in a credit card vault.

Virtual POS facilitates MO/TO payments, also called Mail request/Phone request transactions. MO/TO are suitable for organizations whose customers are far away and therefore, are unable to present a credit or debit card physically. The process is also known as card non-present transaction and includes entering the customer's card details into the virtual terminal to handle the exchange.
