= Interchange fee =

Fee paid between banks for card-based transactions

An interchange fee is a fee paid between banks for the acceptance of card-based transactions. Usually for sales/services transactions it is a fee that a merchant's bank (the "acquiring bank") pays a customer's bank (the "issuing bank").

In a credit card or debit card transaction, the card-issuing bank in a payment transaction deducts the interchange fee from the amount it pays the acquiring bank that handles a credit or debit card transaction for a merchant. The acquiring bank then pays the merchant the amount of the transaction minus both the interchange fee and an additional, usually smaller, fee for the acquiring bank or independent sales organization (ISO), which is often referred to as a discount rate, an add-on rate, or passthru. For cash withdrawal transactions at ATMs, however, the fees are paid by the card-issuing bank to the acquiring bank (for the maintenance of the machine).

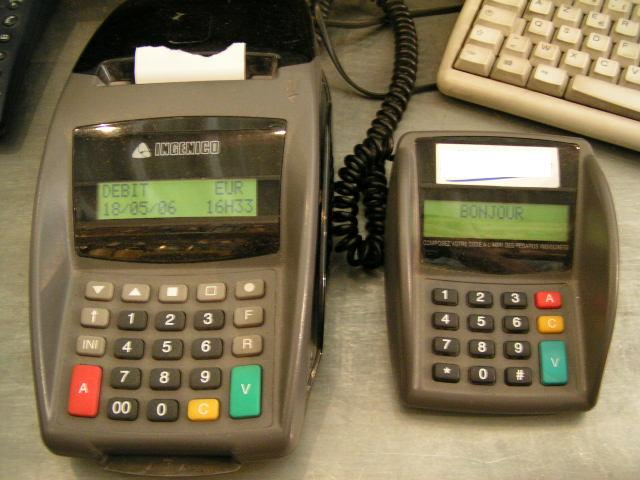
Terminals for swiping credit cards, and origin of the term "swipe fee"

== Overview ==
These fees are set by the credit card networks, and are the largest component of the various fees that most merchants pay for the privilege of accepting credit cards, representing 70% to 90% of these fees by some estimates, although larger merchants typically pay less as a percentage. Interchange fees have a complex pricing structure, which is based on the card brand, regions or jurisdictions, the type of credit or debit card, the type and size of the accepting merchant, and the type of transaction (e.g. online, in-store, phone order, whether the card is present for the transaction, etc.). Further complicating the rate schedules, interchange fees are typically a flat fee plus a percentage of the total purchase price (including taxes). In the United States, the fee averages approximately 2% of transaction value. In the EU, interchange fees are capped to 0.3% of the transaction for credit cards and to 0.2% for debit cards, while there is no cap for corporate cards.

In the U.S., card issuers now make over $30 billion annually from interchange fees. Interchange fees collected by Visa and MasterCard totaled $26 billion in 2004. In 2005, the number was $30.7 billion and the increase totals 85 percent compared to 2001.

=== Merchant fee ===
This payment can fund various rewards and discount, some of which began in the early 1980s, at which time the matter of whether cash and credit prices were to be forced by law to give an advantage to those paying cash.

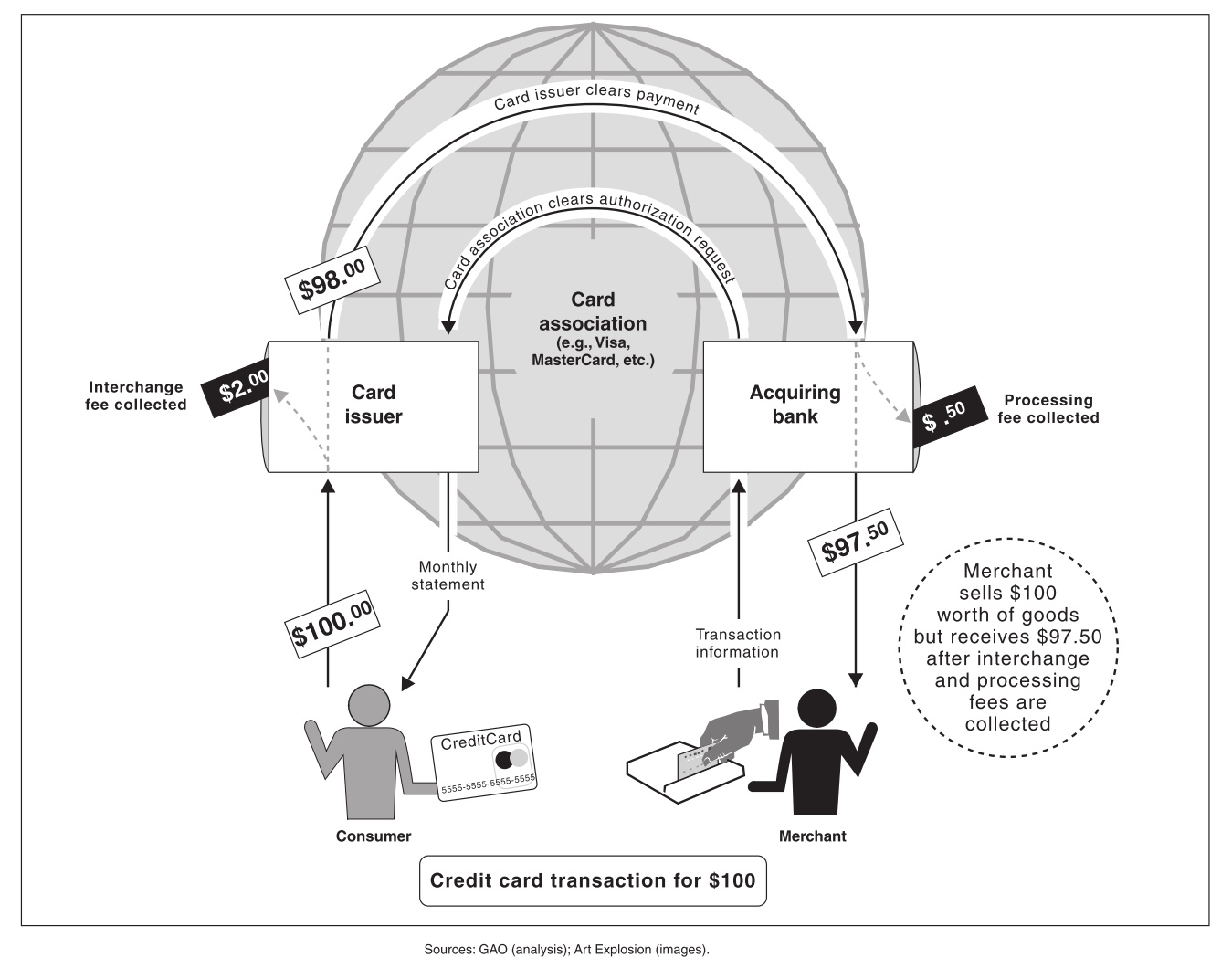
Image from a GAO report explaining how the interchange fee works

Interchange fees are set by the payment networks such as Visa and MasterCard.

== History ==
The first charge card was issued in 1914 by Western Union. The origins of the interchange fee are a matter of some controversy. Often they are assumed to have been developed to maintain and attract a proper mix of issuers and acquirers to bank networks. Research by Professor Adam Levitin of Georgetown University Law Center, however, indicates that interchange fees were originally designed as a method for banks to avoid usury and Truth-in-Lending laws. Typically, the bulk of the fee goes to the issuing bank. Issuing banks' interchange fees are extracted from the amount collected by the merchants when they submit credit or debit transactions for payment through their acquiring banks. Banks do not expect to make a significant amount of money from late fees and interest charges from creditworthy customers (who pay in full every month), and instead make their profits on the interchange fee charged to merchants.

Situations when, for cash transactions, the interchange fee is paid from the issuer to the acquirer, are often called reverse interchange.

Interchange rates are established at differing levels for a variety of reasons. For example, a premium credit card that offers rewards generally will have a higher interchange rate than do standard cards. Transactions made with credit cards generally have higher rates than those with signature debit cards, whose rates are in turn typically higher than PIN debit card transactions. Sales that are not conducted in person (also known as card-not-present transactions) such as by phone or on the Internet, generally are subject to higher interchange rates, than are transactions on cards presented in person. This is due to the increasing risk and rates of fraudulent transactions. Interchange is an industry standard that all merchants are subject to. It is set to encourage issuance and to attract issuing banks to issue a particular brand. Higher interchange is often a tool for schemes to encourage issuance of their particular brand. A 2022-proposed change in Interchange fees, by encouraging use of multiple card networks, was criticized as likely to reduce fraud detection.

For one example of how interchange functions, imagine a consumer making a $100 purchase with a credit card. For that $100 item, the retailer would get approximately $98. The remaining $2, known as the merchant discount and fees, gets divided up. About $1.75 would go to the card issuing bank (defined as interchange), $0.18 would go to Visa or MasterCard association (defined as assessments), and the remaining $0.07 would go to the retailer's merchant account provider. If a credit card displays a Visa logo, Visa will get the $0.18, likewise with MasterCard. Visa's and MasterCard's assessments are fixed at 0.1100% of the transaction value, with MasterCard's assessment increased to 0.1300% of the transaction value for consumer and business credit volume on transactions of $1,000 or greater. On average the interchange rates in the U.S. are 179 basis points (1.79%, 1 basis point is 1/100 of a percentage) and vary widely across countries. In April 2007 Visa announced it would raise its rate 0.6% to 1.77%.

According to a January 2007 poll by Harris interactive, only about a third of the public had heard of interchange fees; once explained to them, 90% said that the United States Congress "should compel credit card companies to better inform consumers" about the fee.

== Controversy ==
=== Who pays ===
In recent years, interchange fees have become a controversial issue, the subject of regulatory and antitrust investigations. Many large merchants such as Wal-Mart have the ability to negotiate fee prices, and while some merchants prefer cash or PIN-based debit cards, most believe they cannot realistically refuse to accept the major card network–branded cards. This holds true even when their interchange-driven fees exceed their profit margins. Some countries, such as Australia, have established significantly lower interchange fees, although according to a U.S. Government Accountability Office study, the savings enjoyed by merchants were not passed along to consumers. The fees are also the subject of several ongoing lawsuits in the United States.

=== Price-fixing ===
Regulators in several countries have questioned the collective determination of interchange rates and fees as potential examples of price fixing. Merchant groups in particular, including the U.S.-based Merchants Payments Coalition and Merchant Bill of Rights, also claim that interchange fees are much higher than necessary, pointing to the fact that even though technology and efficiency have improved, interchange fees have more than doubled in the last 10 years. Issuing banks argue that reduced interchange fees would result in increased costs for cardholders, and reduce their ability to satisfy rewards on cards already issued.

=== Consumer welfare ===
A 2010 public policy study conducted by the Federal Reserve concluded the reward program aspect of interchange fees results in a non-trivial monetary transfer from low-income to high-income households. Reducing merchant fees and card rewards would likely increase consumer welfare.

The Merchants Payments Coalition is fighting for a more competitive and transparent card fee system that better serves American consumers and merchants alike. Because swipe fees are hidden, consumers are unable to weigh the benefits and costs associated with choosing a particular form of payment. Eliminating hidden swipe fees is advocated as a means to realize an open market system for electronic payments.

== By region ==
=== United States ===
==== Payment Card Interchange Fee and Merchant Discount Antitrust Litigation ====
The Payment Card Interchange Fee and Merchant Discount Antitrust Litigation is a United States class-action lawsuit filed in 2005 by merchants and trade associations against Visa, MasterCard, and numerous financial institutions that issue payment cards. The suit was filed due to price fixing and other allegedly anti-competitive trade practices in the credit card industry. A proposed settlement received preliminary approval from the judge overseeing the case in November 2012 but the majority of named class plaintiffs have objected and many have vowed to opt out of the settlement.

In December 2013, U.S. District Court Judge John Gleeson approved a settlement for $7.25 billion. The settlement reduces interchange fees for merchants and also protects credit card companies from lawsuits over the issue in the future again.

==== Legislation and Congressional investigations ====
Senate hearings in the United States have focused on the secrecy surrounding interchange fee schedules and card operating rules. In 2006 Visa and MasterCard both released some fee schedules and summary reports of their card rules, though pressure continues for them to release the full documents. In January 2007, Senate Banking committee chairman Chris Dodd cited interchange fees at a hearing on credit card industry practices and again in March the fees were criticized by Sen. Norm Coleman. In January 2007, Microsoft chairman Bill Gates cited high interchange fees as a significant reason Microsoft believes it can't be competitive in online micropayments.

In March 2007, MasterCard announced it was changing its rate structure, splitting the lower, "basic" tier for credit cards into two new tiers. The Wall Street Journal reported that the document outlining the shift "makes it difficult to determine if the new rates, on average, are rising." MasterCard spokesman Joshua Peirez said the new structure "allows us to have a more sophisticated way to break up our credit card portfolio," while National Retail Federation general counsel Mallory Duncan said, "They are pricing each tier at the absolute most they can so they can maximize their income."

On July 19, 2007 the House Judiciary Committee antitrust task force held the first hearing to study the specific issue of interchange fees. NRF's Duncan testified, as did representatives from the credit card industry. Subcommittee chairman John Conyers, leading the panel, said, "While I come into the hearing with an open mind, I do believe the burden of the proof lies with the credit card companies to reassure Congress that increasing interchange fees are not harming merchants and ultimately consumers."

On October 1, 2010, the Durbin Amendment came into effect as a last minute addition to the Dodd–Frank Wall Street Reform and Consumer Protection Act of 2010. As a result, banks have begun to limit the incentives offered with their checking account products, and some have announced that they would begin to charge their customers a fee for the use of the cards.

In the same month, Visa and MasterCard reached a settlement with the U.S. Justice Department in an antitrust case focused on the issue of competitiveness in the interchange market. The companies agreed to allow merchants displaying their logos to decline certain types of cards, or to offer consumers discounts for using cheaper cards.

=== European Union ===
In 2002 the European Commission exempted Visa's multilateral interchange fees from Article 81 of the EC Treaty that prohibits anti-competitive arrangements. However, this exemption expired on December 31, 2007. In the United Kingdom, MasterCard has reduced its interchange fees while it is under investigation by the Office of Fair Trading.

In January 2007, the European Commission issued the results of a two-year inquiry into the retail banking sector. The report focuses on payment cards and interchange fees. Upon publishing the report, Commissioner Neelie Kroes said the "present level of interchange fees in many of the schemes we have examined does not seem justified." The report called for further study of the issue.

On December 19, 2007, the European Commission issued a decision prohibiting MasterCard's multilateral interchange fee for cross-border payment card transactions with MasterCard and Maestro branded debit and consumer credit cards. The Commission concluded that this fee violated Article 81 of the EC Treaty that prohibits anti-competitive agreements. MasterCard has appealed the Commission's decision before the EU Court of First Instance; while the appeal is pending MasterCard has temporarily repealed its multilateral interchange fees.

On March 26, 2008, the European Commission opened an investigation into Visa's multilateral interchange fees for cross-border transactions within the EEA as well as into the "Honour-All-Cards" rule (under which merchants are required to accept all valid Visa-branded cards).

The antitrust authorities of EU member states other than the United Kingdom are also investigating MasterCard's and Visa's interchange fees. For example, on January 4, 2007, the Polish Office of Competition and Consumer Protection fined twenty banks a total of PLN 164 million (about $56 million) for jointly setting MasterCard's and Visa's interchange fees.

In March 2015, the European Parliament voted to cap interchange fees to 0.3% for credit cards and to 0.2% for debit cards, which was subsequently enacted under Regulation (EU) 2015/751 with effect from 8 June 2015. The caps apply only to personal cards where there is an intermediary, not to cards issued to businesses or to cards issued by American Express.

That same year, the Revised Payment Services Directive banned merchant surcharges, although it did not enter into force until 2018.

=== Australia and New Zealand ===
In 2003, the Reserve Bank of Australia required that interchange fees be dramatically reduced, from about 0.95% of the transaction to approximately 0.5%. One notable result has been the reduced use of reward cards and increased use of debit cards. Australia also removed the "no surcharge" rule, a policy established by credit card networks like Visa and MasterCard to prevent merchants from charging a credit card usage fee to the cardholder. A surcharge would mitigate or even exceed the merchant discount paid by a merchant, but would also make the cardholder more reluctant to use the card as the method of payment. Australia has also made changes to the interchange rates on debit cards, and has considered abolishing interchange fees altogether. In February 2016 the Competition and Consumer Amendment (Payment Surcharges) Act 2016 became law.

In 2006, the New Zealand Commerce Commission issued proceedings against Visa and MasterCard, alleging that interchange fees constitute price fixing and result in a substantial lessening of competition. Shortly before the court case was due to start in Autumn 2009, the suit was settled out of court; the "no surcharge rule" was prohibited, allowing retailers to pass on the cost of MasterCard and Visa transactions to the customer, and card issuers were allowed to set their own interchange fees, within a maximum limit set by Visa or MasterCard. All issuers of MasterCard cards in New Zealand announced they would be charging the maximum rate. The Commission released a report in 2013 reviewing the outcome of the settlement, showing that many merchants were paying higher fees for accepting credit cards than before the settlement. In 2020, the New Zealand Government announced plans to regulate the bank payment system to lower merchant service fees on debit and credit card fees, to bring them further into line with those in other countries, in particular Australia.
