= James Schmidt (serial killer) =

South Sudanese-born Danish serial killer

- Born: Lual Yai Fayin Lual; 1992 (age 33–34); Sudan (present-day part of South Sudan)
- Convictions: Murder x3 Attempted murder Rape
- Penalty: Life imprisonment

Details
- Victims: 3
- Span of crimes: 5 February – 7 March 2019
- Country: Denmark
- State: Capital Region
- Date apprehended: 9 March 2019

James Schmidt (born Lual Yai Fayin Lual in 1992), currently known under the name Cornelius Bach, is a South Sudanese-born Danish serial killer and rapist who killed three pensioners in Copenhagen's Østerbro district from February to March 2019, just two years after being released after serving out a 7-year prison sentence for raping a 14-year-old girl as a juvenile. After initially being convicted for two of the murders and acquitted of the third, he was tried again and successfully convicted in all three, resulting in a life sentence.

The case garnered controversy for several reasons, including the inadequate police response, the leniency towards Schmidt's previous convictions and his initial acquittal in one of the murders.

== Early life and crimes ==
James Schmidt was born under the name Lual Yai Fayin Lual in 1992, in what is now part of South Sudan. At age seven, his mother took him and his brother to Denmark, initially settling in Holbæk, where she soon began dating an older man with the surname Henning. While Henning treated the young Lual like his own son, often taking him on trips around the countryside, he would also scold him whenever he did something bad or for not listening to him or his mother.

While he was regarded as a nice boy by his immediate family, Lual was notorious amongst female students and teachers at his primary school for either grooming or groping them. In 2002, at the age of 10, allegations arose that he had attempted to rape a 6-year-old girl, but he was presumably not charged due to his young age. Three years later, unable to take proper care of her son anymore, Lual's mother sent him to a foster home. Despite the staff's best efforts, he proved to be problematic as he often fought with other children and seemed obsessed with sex, often shouting that he was "God's gift to women." Because of this, he was often moved around various juvenile detention centers, where he continued to cause problems. Eventually, he was ordered to undergo a psychiatric evaluation, with the examiners concluding that Lual suffered from narcissistic personality disorder and showed a complete lack of empathy for others' suffering.

Despite warnings that he would pose an immediate danger if released unsupervised, Lual was released in 2009 and returned to Holbæk, where he began playing in the local football club and often frequented the nightclubs around West Zealand County. On 5 August, he took a 14-year-old girl to his house and raped her. After finishing, he pulled out his phone and started recording her: in the recording, he instructed her to say that it was consensual and not to tell her parents. However, Lual was arrested only a short time later and imprisoned at the Institution of Sønderbro to await trial. On 24 February 2010, he was visited by a 30-year-old friend of his mother, but when the two were left alone in the visiting room, Lual punched her several times and attempted to rape and strangled her to death. Before he could finish her off, the woman woke up and squeezed his genitals, forcing him to recoil in pain and allowing her to escape. At a later court hearing regarding this attack, Lual tried to place the blame on the woman, claiming she suddenly got up and took off his clothes in an attempt to sexually assault him, and he resorted to strangling her in self-defense. He was ordered to undergo another psychiatric evaluation, which reiterated previous findings that he was a narcissist who showed a complete lack of empathy.

Despite his claims of innocence, the Copenhagen City Court found him guilty on all counts and sentenced him to indefinite detention. At the time, he was believed to be the youngest person in the country's modern history to have received this harsh level of punishment. Lual eventually appealed the decision to the Supreme Court, and to his benefit, the justices presiding over his case took pity on him and reduced the sentence to 7 years imprisonment, citing the offender's young age and his lack of previous criminal convictions. During his incarceration, Lual attacked and attempted to strangle a prison guard in November 2014, for which he was given only 60 days, and in February 2016, he punched and attempted to strangle another guard, supposedly because he was being racist towards him. While the latter victim had to be hospitalized, it is unknown if he faced any additional charges for this attack.

=== Release ===
Sometime circa late 2017, Lual was released from prison, now having legally changed his name to James Schmidt. According to posts on social media, he presented himself as a promising musician and talent manager for the Copenhagen area. Notably, Schmidt made several boastful claims, amongst which was that members of Aarhus Fremad thought he was a talented footballer and that he was the modern-day Martin Luther King Jr. He also openly and proudly proclaimed to be a member of the Social Democrats and that his brother worked as a surgeon in Rigshospitalet, both of which have not been confirmed with certainty.

== Murders, investigation, and arrest ==
After his release, Schmidt frequently visited a relative who lived in the Vangehusvej apartment complex in the Østerbro district, where he had easy access to the stairway as he had a spare key. Between early 2018 and March 2019, a series of deaths took place in the complex, which was considered an unusually high amount. The first to raise suspicion was the mysterious 7 February 2019 death of 83-year-old Eva Hoffmeister, but due to the police's slow response time, her relatives, who believed she had died of natural causes, had her body cremated before an autopsy could take place.

Not long after, another suspicious death was recorded at the complex on 2 March, when 80-year-old Peter Jensen Olsen was found deceased at his apartment. While it was initially thought that he had also died of natural causes, an autopsy performed on his body concluded that he had been strangled. While authorities were still investigating, yet another death occurred only five days later: this time, 81-year-old Inez Hasselblad was found dead in her apartment. She was found by her daughter, Malene, who found the circumstances surrounding her death highly suspicious and resorted to making a list of the things she found odd. Eventually, she called her mother's bank and was notified that her Dankort card had been blocked, and while the employee provided no details, she advised Hasselblad to call the police. After this, she immediately informed the police, who eventually identified and arrested Schmidt on 9 March in front of the cinema "Imperial", where he had just watched a screening of Captain Marvel.

After Schmidt's arrest, investigators interrogated him as to why he had Hasselblad's card, to which he replied that he had simply found it on the floor of the complex. Unconvinced by his explanations, authorities investigated the deaths in depth, concluding that Schmidt had used the Dankort cards of Hoffmeister, Olsen and Hasselblad. Because of this, he was charged with three counts of murder and fraud, for which he vehemently denied responsibility. During the entirety of the first trial, the media did not reveal the suspect's name because of a gag order, but confirmed that he had been convicted of raping a minor girl under his birth name. This ruling was later overturned by the High Court, which rescinded the gag order and allowed the suspect's name to be published in the press.

== Trials, imprisonment, and aftermath ==
During the proceedings, Schmidt willingly admitted to stealing both Hoffmeister and Hasselblad's cards, as well as attempting to steal Olsen's, which he apparently was unable to find, but categorically denied the murder charges. His defence attorney contested that while Schmidt did indeed know and had visited Hasselblad before, he was not attempting to hide it, which was supposedly what the actual killer would attempt to do. Conversely, the prosecutor said that his explanations for the events were "unbelievable" and pointed out the findings of previous psychiatric assessments and the one conducted during the trial, for which he called the defendant a "cold-blooded predator." When he was allowed to take the stand, Schmidt himself continued to deny the charges, saying that he was not a psychopath and decrying the prosecutor for attempting to have him locked behind bars. At one point, he also directly addressed Inez Hasselblad's daughter, Malene, saying that she was ruining his life by having his image displayed on national television, for which he was reprimanded by the judge and ordered to calm down.

At the end of the first trial, Schmidt was found guilty in the murders of Olsen and Hasselblad, but was acquitted in the Hoffmeister murder due to a lack of evidence. After both the prosecutor and his attorney finished their arguments, the presiding justice Karsten Henriksen allowed Schmidt to take the stand if he wanted to say something, with him proclaiming his innocence and that he would like to appeal to the Supreme Court as soon as possible, saying that his trial was "not fair." In the end, he was sentenced to life imprisonment by the judges, who found no mitigating circumstances to issue a lesser sentence. As the verdict was read out, Schmidt just sat expressionless in his chair, without uttering a single word.

At his subsequent trial, additional evidence was presented that further implicated Schmidt in Hoffmeister's murder, thus bringing a new set of charges against him. Prosecutor Sidsel Klixbül argued that he should be given a complete life term rather than the standard, where Schmidt would be eligible for parole after serving 16 years, pointing out that he will likely re-offend if he is ever let out again. Thus, the High Court overturned the district court's ruling and tried him for the third, resulting in a successful conviction which netted Schmidt a full life sentence.

=== Prison stabbing ===
Sometime after his incarceration, Schmidt officially changed his name to Cornelius Bach. In August 2023, he was assaulted and stabbed by four inmates in his jail cell. Schmidt survived the attack, and the incident is currently under investigation.

== See also ==
- List of serial killers by country
