= Château de Bourron =

Château in Seine-et-Marne, France

Coordinates: 48.3406°N 2.6961°E

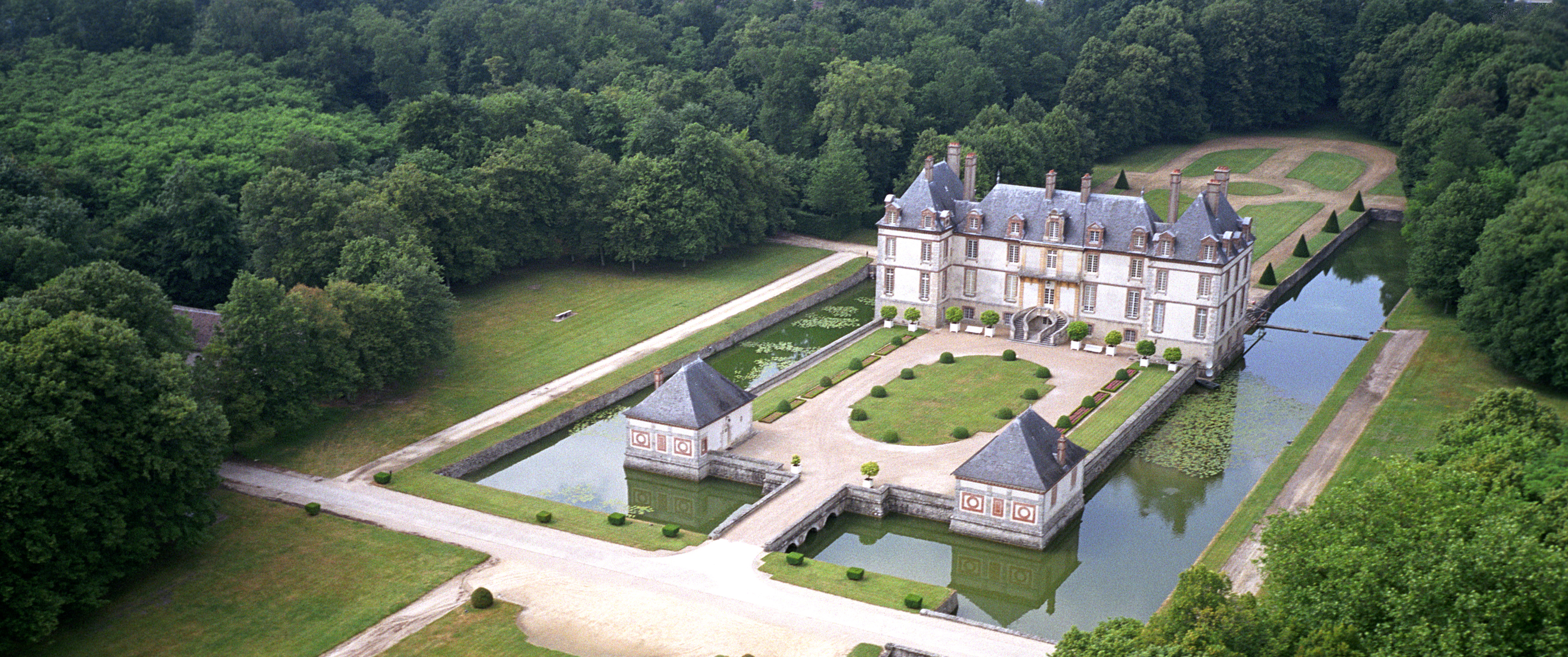
Château de Bourron

The Château de Bourron is a château in Bourron-Marlotte, Seine-et-Marne, France.

== History ==
The present château, which was built to replace a medieval castle, dates back to the 16th century, shortly after François de Sallard married Diane Clausse, whose father was Finance Secretary to Henri II and brought in a large dowry which proved necessary for its construction.

In 1725, Polish King Stanisław Leszczyński was in exile here.

In 1794, during the French Revolution, sans-culottes from Nemours went on a rampage and pillaged the château.

Since 1878 it has been owned by the Montesquiou family.

In 2016, It was used for the filming location used for Louis' Castle in the first episode of Shopping King Louie.

== Bibliography ==
- Nicole Benefice, Le Château de Bourron (caisse nationale des monuments historiques, 1984).
