= George Wallner =

Hungarian-born engineer and entrepreneur

- Born: Hungary
- Education: Kandó Kálmán Technical College
- Occupations: Engineer, entrepreneur
- Known for: Founder of Hypercom; co-founder of LoopPay; co-founder of Magnet Defense
- Relatives: Paul Wallner (brother)

George Wallner is a Hungarian-born engineer, inventor and entrepreneur. He founded the payment terminal manufacturer Hypercom in 1978 and later co-founded LoopPay, the mobile-payments company where he developed the Magnetic Secure Transmission technology behind Samsung Pay. He is a co-founder and chief technology officer of Magnet Defense, a Miami firm building autonomous unmanned surface vessels.

== Early life and education ==
Wallner was born in Hungary and studied electrical and communications engineering at Kandó Kálmán Technical College in Budapest. He emigrated to Australia in 1973 and spent roughly five years there building large telephone systems and data-collection networks.

== Career ==
=== Hypercom ===
Wallner founded Hypercom in 1978 with his brother Paul, building it from a business plan the two had drawn up in Sydney. Its systems delivered credit-card authorizations to merchant terminals quickly, and the company became an early maker of point-of-sale payment terminals. Hypercom used the Australian operation as a base to expand across the Asia-Pacific region, and later moved into Latin America. It relocated its headquarters to the United States in the late 1980s and settled in the Phoenix area, where it competed with VeriFone.

Hypercom listed on the New York Stock Exchange in 1997, with Wallner still its majority owner. The following year, The Nilson Report ranked him among the top ten smart-card experts. He chaired the board from the company's founding until mid-1999 and was president and chief executive until late 2000. He then served as chief strategist until 2003, when he moved into a consulting role.

=== LoopPay and Samsung Pay ===
Wallner came out of retirement in 2012 to co-found LoopPay with Will Graylin. He had earlier backed two of Graylin's mobile-payments ventures, ROAM Data and WAY Systems, as an investor and board member. As chief technology officer at the Burlington, Massachusetts company, he developed Magnetic Secure Transmission (MST), a method that lets a smartphone send payment-card data to an ordinary magnetic-stripe terminal without any change to the merchant's hardware.

Samsung Electronics acquired LoopPay in February 2015 as part of its move into mobile payments. Later that year LoopPay revealed that hackers had breached its corporate network months earlier. The company said the intruders had not reached its payment-management systems.

=== Marine technology and defense ===
Wallner owns Atlantitech, a Miami-based company that makes marine electronics and control systems, and he has owned and helped design several vessels. In 2020 the Louisiana shipbuilder Metal Shark delivered Magnet, a 48-metre aluminium expedition catamaran built to his commission. Incat Crowther was responsible for the naval architecture. Wallner designed the control system that runs the boat, and Atlantitech supplied much of its electrical equipment.

Wallner co-founded Magnet Defense, a Miami defense-technology company developing autonomous unmanned surface vessels, and is its chief technology officer. The company began production of its first M48 in March 2026 and expects to deliver it in the second quarter of 2027. In April 2026, at the Sea-Air-Space Exposition, it signed a memorandum of understanding with Hanwha Defense USA to jointly build a 38-metre unmanned vessel.
