= Merchant account provider =

Merchant Account Providers give businesses the ability to accept debit and credit cards in payment for goods and services. This can be face-to-face, on the telephone, or over the internet.

Credit cards have become the preferred method of payment in today's market, making a merchant account essential for most businesses.

== Overview ==
Historically, credit card processing services were supplied by banks that were members of the Visa or MasterCard networks. Typically banks both issued credit cards and helped merchants process them, but over time the industry consolidated. Now the industry is dominated by a few large issuers, with the top ten issuers holding 81.5% of outstanding credit card balances as of 2019. Even fewer banks process credit cards. Banks found that it was not within their skillset to convince every small merchant to accept credit cards, and they began to outsource the selling of such services to small companies called ISOs (Independent Sales Organizations). They also found that massive scale helped reduce the cost of processing credit cards, so they began to outsource processing to a few processors including Elavon, TSYS, First Data and MSI.

While some merchants buy their credit card processing services directly from a bank, more typically they get their credit card processing services from an ISO, which is responsible for selling the service to the merchant, providing technical support, processing the transaction (authorizing it and submitting it to the Visa or MasterCard network), bearing the risk of chargeback(s), and setting the price of the services. If the ISO is small it might outsource some of those services (for example, providing technical support) to a larger ISO. Except for the few very largest ISOs, the ISO outsources the actual processing to a larger company that focuses solely on processing.

While each of the firms discussed above provides merchant accounts and could legitimately be called the merchant account provider, in practice the phrase usually refers to whichever organization has responsibility for directly maintaining the relationship with the merchant.

== Services ==
=== Point of sale (POS) equipment ===
Point of sale terminals, also known as EPoS ('e' signifying this is an electronic point of sale) may be portable, mobile, fixed, adapted for transactions carried out behind a glass partition, or specially adapted for business-to-business transactions. Portable and counter top terminals are common place in restaurants and retail shops, while mobile (GPRS) terminals are more commonly used by businesses that need to take payment on the premises of the customer.

=== Purchase with cashback ===
Cashback allows customers to request cash from the cash register along with the transaction. This cash is debited from their account via the EFTPOS (Electronic Funds Transfer at Point of Sale) terminal. This service is of considerable convenience to the customer and provides benefits to the business including increased footfall, impulse buying, and increased numbers of customers due to the added convenience of cashback.

=== eCommerce solutions ===
Businesses that sell goods and services via the internet require secure means of conducting the transactions end to end.

=== Virtual Terminal ===
Cloud management of payment channels. Invoice, request payment, manage clients payment information and recurring billing cycles.

=== Anti-fraud measures ===
Minimizing the risk of fraud both to the client and to the client's customers.

== See also ==
- Merchant account
- Credit card fraud
- Chargeback insurance
- Payment card industry (PCI)
- Cardholder Information Security Program (CISP)
