= Tour of the Fontainebleau Forest =

- Tour du Massif de Fontainebleau (TMF)
- Length: 74 km (46 mi)
- Location: Seine‑et‑Marne, Île‑de‑France, France
- Established: 1975
- Use: Hiking
- Elevation gain/loss: 1,000 metres (3,300 ft)
- Season: All year round
- Waymark: Green and white markers (original), updated in newer guidebooks
- Maintainer: Office National des Forêts

The tour of the Fontainebleau Forest (French: Tour du Massif de Fontainebleau, TMF) is a hiking path all around the Forest of Fontainebleau, in the Parisian region.

== Description ==
This footpath has been created in 1975 by the Office National des Forêts and was originally 65 km long. It used to be marked out with green and white markers. A new 74 km itinerary has since been published, especially in the guidebook La Seine-et-Marne... à pied which proposes several routes in the department of Seine-et-Marne. This tour links several well-known towns including Fontainebleau, Bourron-Marlotte, Barbizon, Bois-le-Roi and follow different GR footpaths such as the GR 1, the GR 2, the GR 11 or the GR 13 with about 1000 m of difference in height. It crosses varied landscapes including “ancient woodlands, rock piles, platières and a few breathtaking views”.

== Route ==
The tour can be achieved in two, three or four days, depending on hikers' walking speed. Several variants are possible. One possibility is to cover the circuit within four days, starting from Fontainebleau-Avon. The first stage leads the hikers to Bourron-Marlotte, a small town which used to be “the stopping place of numerous painters, musicians and writers”, such as Jean Renoir or Paul Cézanne. The second day allows hikers to reach the hermitage of Franchard, going through the town of Recloses and its remarkable church. Then, the third stage rejoins Bois-le-Roi. This step passes through the town of Barbizon, considered as “a village of painters” as it has received since the 1850s painters from all over the world and has been one of the centres of the impressionist movement. The forest around Barbizon has been the first protected area in France since a reserve has been created in 1861. It is also a worldwide recognized climbing area. To finish, the final step returns to Fontainebleau, following the Seine.

== Accommodation ==
Pitching tents along the trail is not allowed. However, two bivouac areas with water points are located next to the footpath in Bourron-Marlotte and Bois-le-Roi. In Samois-sur-Seine, there is also a campsite. Several hostels, guesthouses or campsites are also available in the villages which border the circuit. Moreover, two restaurants in the forest (near Fontainebleau and Barbizon) and many more in the different towns allow the hikers to eat.

== Access ==
From Paris, the circuit can be reached by train in 40 minutes starting from Gare de Lyon and stopping either at Fontainebleau-Avon, Bois-le-Roi or Bourron-Marlotte-Grez train station. On weekends, there is also a stop in the middle of the forest (Fontainebleau-Forêt). The town of Barbizon can be reached by bus from Melun or Fontainebleau-Avon train station. By car, several car parks are located near the footpath, especially in the towns along the trail (Bois-le-Roi, Barbizon,…). From Paris, the motorway A6 in the direction of Lyon must be taken.
