= Hypercom =

Former software company

Hypercom Corporation
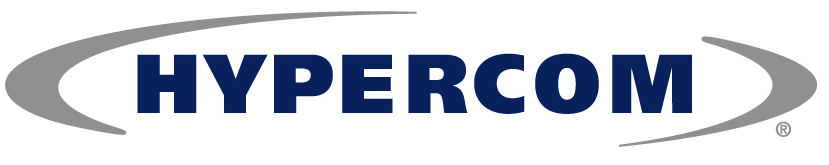
- Type: Public
- Traded as: NYSE: HYC
- Founded: Australia, (1978)
- Founder: George Wallner
- Defunct: 2011
- Fate: Acquired by Verifone
- Headquarters: Scottsdale, Arizona, United States
- Key people: Norman Stout, Chairman; Philippe Tartavull, CEO & President
- Products: Payment terminals
- Website: www.hypercom.com

Hypercom Corporation was an Australian company which was a pioneer of electronic payment processing hardware and software. It was acquired by rival VeriFone in 2011.

== History ==
Hypercom was founded by Hungarian born George Wallner, David Saul, Brian Pascoe, and Leslie Fritz in Sydney Australia in 1978. It went on to dominate the South Pacific region in terms of payment terminals. In 1988 the company signed a deal with American Express to provide its terminals to them in the US. To consolidate the deal, Hypercom moved its head office from Australia to Arizona in the US. It then faced head-to-head competition with VeriFone on its home market.

On April 4, 2011, Ingenico announced its agreement to acquire Hypercom's U.S. Payment Systems Business prior to the close of the VeriFone acquisition On the same day it announced that its UK and Spanish operations would be sold separately to a private investment company and this business was renamed as Spire Payments.

On May 12, 2011, The Department of Justice filed a civil antitrust lawsuit to block the proposed acquisition of Hypercom by VeriFone saying the planned sale of Hypercom's U.S. POS terminal business to Ingenico does not resolve the antitrust concerns

On August 4, 2011, VeriFone announced its completion of the acquisition of Hypercom U.S. business after reaching a settlement with antitrust regulators to sell Hypercom's U.S. payment systems business to an entity sponsored by investment firm Gores Group LLC Simultaneously, KleinPartners Capital announced the acquisition of Hypercom Spain S.A. and Hypercom UK, with Kazem Aminaee, the former President of Hypercom Europe, Middle East, and Africa, forming Spire Payments

On September 30, 2011, Hypercom US announced it formally changed its corporate name to Equinox Payments, LLC.
