= Bourron-Marlotte =

- Commune
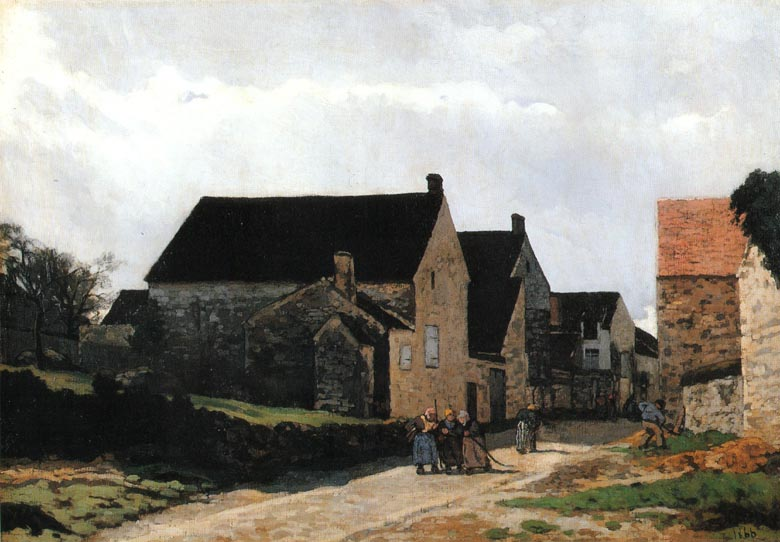
- Alfred Sisley - Street of Marlotte (1866)

- Coat of arms
- Location of Bourron-Marlotte
- Location within France Location within Île-de-France (region)
- Coordinates: 48°20′11″N 2°41′54″E
- Country: France
- Region: Île-de-France
- Department: Seine-et-Marne
- Arrondissement: Fontainebleau
- Canton: Fontainebleau
- Intercommunality: CA Pays de Fontainebleau

Government
  - Mayor (2020–2026): Victor Valente
- Area^{1}: 11.26 km^{2} (4.35 sq mi)
- Highest elevation: 127 m (417 ft)
- Lowest elevation: 52 m (171 ft)
- Population (2023): 2,774
  - Density: 246.4/km^{2} (638.1/sq mi)
- Time zone: UTC+01:00 (CET)
  - Summer (DST): UTC+02:00 (CEST)
- INSEE/Postal code: 77048 /77780
- ^{1} French Land Register data, which excludes lakes, ponds, glaciers > 1 km^{2} (0.386 sq mi or 247 acres) and river estuaries.

Bourron-Marlotte (French pronunciation: [buʁɔ̃ maʁlɔt]) is a commune in the Seine-et-Marne department in the Île-de-France region in north-central France. In the second half of the 19th century, it was visited by several impressionist painters including Alfred Sisley, Pierre-Auguste Renoir and Paul Cézanne. Bourron-Marlotte – Grez station has rail connections to Montargis, Melun and Paris.

== Population ==
Historical population
Year	Pop.	±% p.a.
1968	2,276	—
1975	2,417	+0.86%
1982	2,325	−0.55%
1990	2,424	+0.52%
1999	2,737	+1.36%
2007	2,862	+0.56%
2012	2,647	−1.55%
2017	2,772	+0.93%
2023	2,774	+0.01%
Source: INSEE

The inhabitants are called Bourronnais-Marlottins in French.

== Famous residents ==
The following people have lived in Bourron-Marlotte

- Paul Cézanne (1839–1906), painter, artist

== See also ==
- Château de Bourron
- Communes of the Seine-et-Marne department
