= Terminated merchant file =

A terminated merchant file (TMF) is a tool used by credit card processing companies to screen potential merchants before giving them a merchant account. In the case of Mastercard and American Express it is known as the MATCH list.

The terminated merchant files are shared among processors and act as blacklists, where merchants with high-risk accounts or excessive chargebacks are put on the list and prevented from opening an account with a different credit card processor.

Other reasons for being put on a terminated merchant file include:

- Merchant collusion
- Fraud
- Money laundering
