= Credit card imprinter =

Mechanical device for transferring payment card details to paper

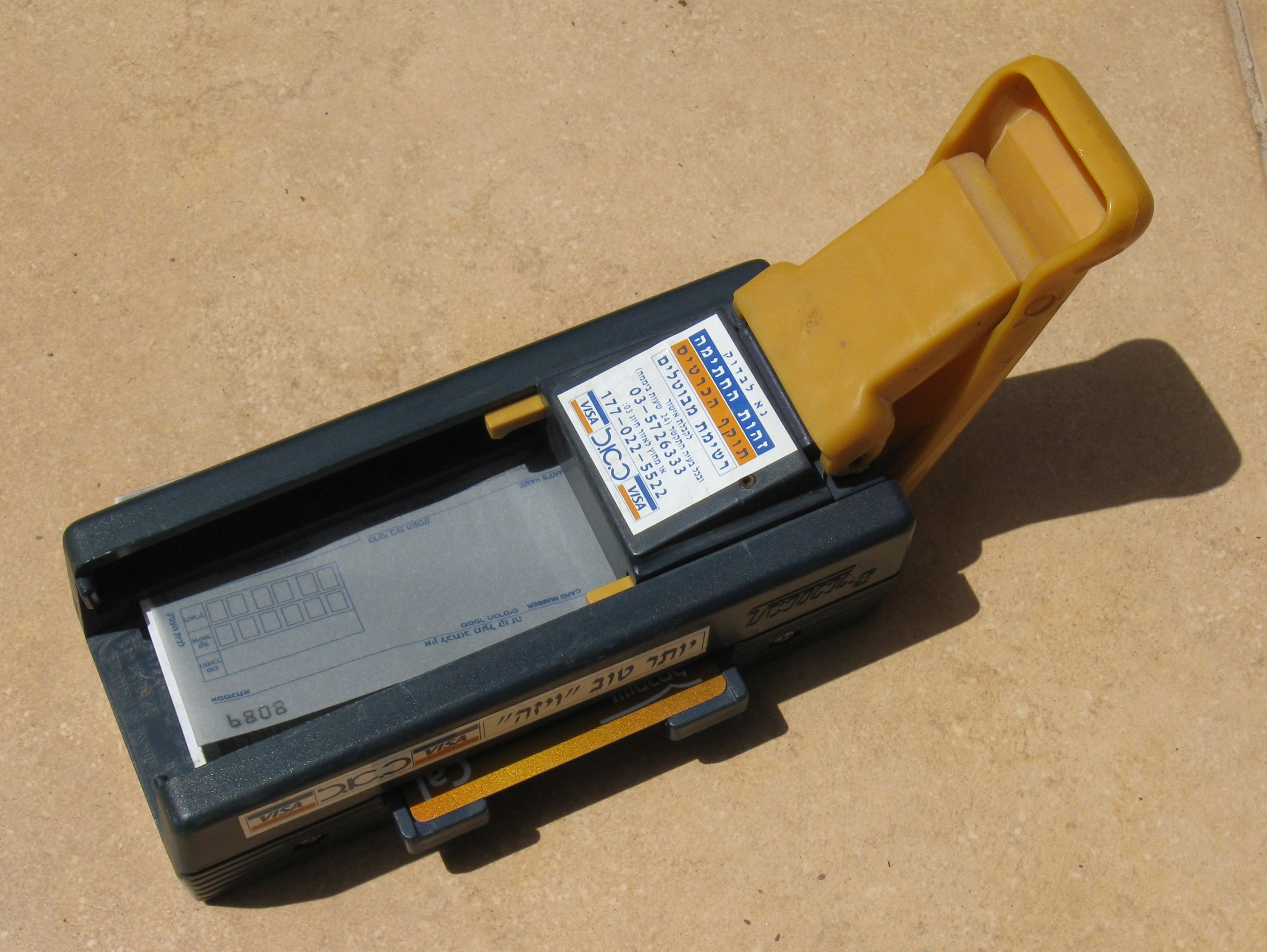
Manual card imprinter

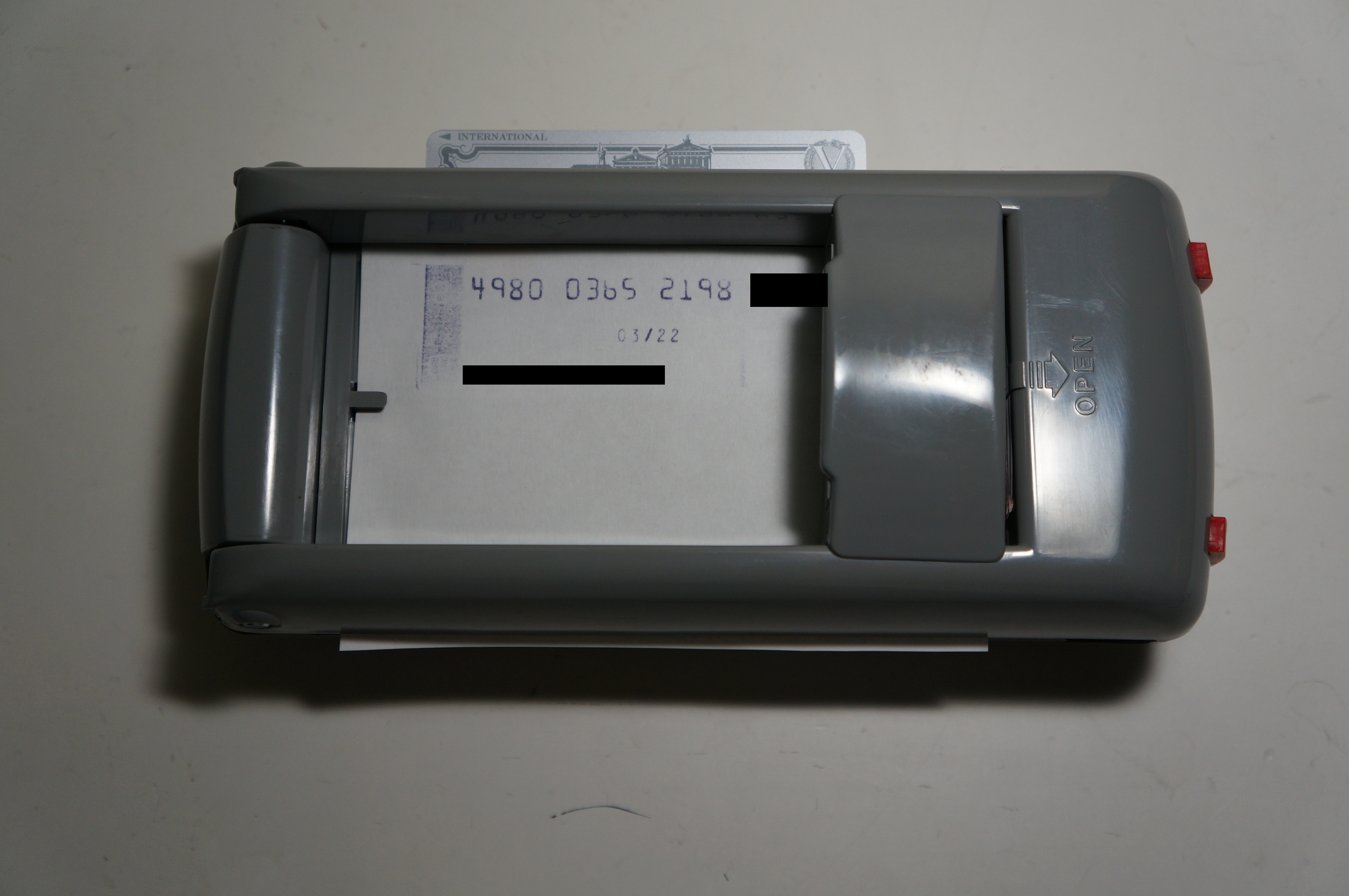
Another type of manual card imprinter (Janome M220) with a smaller sliding handle

A credit card imprinter, colloquially known as a ZipZap machine, Click Clack or Knuckle Buster, is a manual device that was used by merchants to record payment card transactions before the advent of payment terminals.

The device works by placing the customer’s credit card into a bed in the machine, then layering carbon paper forms over the card. A bar is slid back and forth over the paper to create an impression of the embossed card data and the merchant information on the imprinter. The customer signs these paper forms, with one copy as the customer receipt and the other kept by the merchant.

== History ==
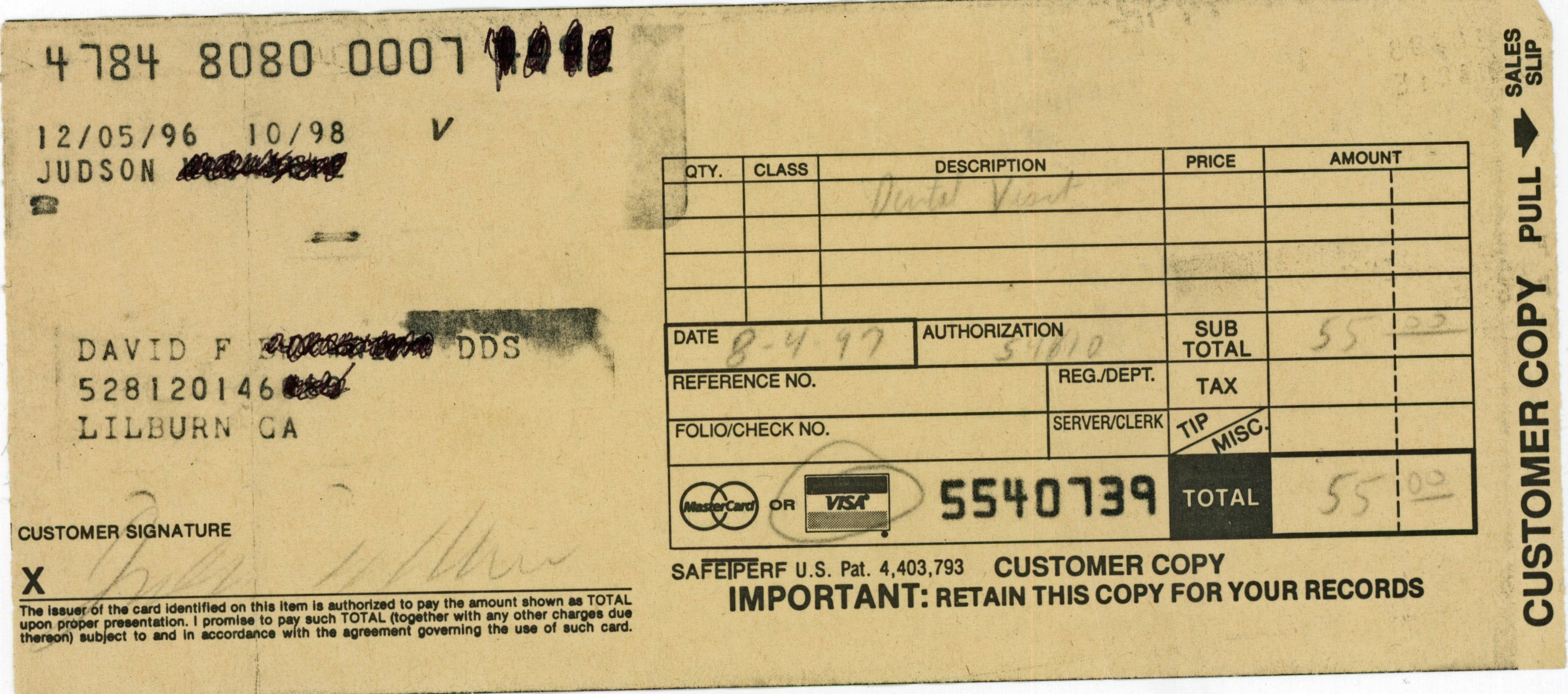
Receipt from 1997 – card physically swiped and information imprinted on the receipt

These devices were used from the advent of charge cards and payment cards in the 1950s‍–‍60s until the 1980s‍–‍90s when electronic payment terminals started to replace them. Imprinters had several disadvantages compared with cash and electronic terminals, including confusion as to whether banks treated slips as cheques or cleared cash, and the ability to use blocked cards. However, they continued to be used well into the 2000s for places where network access was difficult, such as mobile locations like taxis and airplanes, or as a backup system in case of payment terminal failure. This practice has been abandoned as of the 2020s, with payment terminal failure now typically resulting in businesses accepting cash only or refusing to process transactions until the system is restored.

Starting in the late 2010s, some credit card issuers began to use cards without embossed numbers, making them incompatible with card imprinters.

== See also ==
- EFTPOS
- Payment terminal
