= Payment terminal =

Device for electronic fund transfers

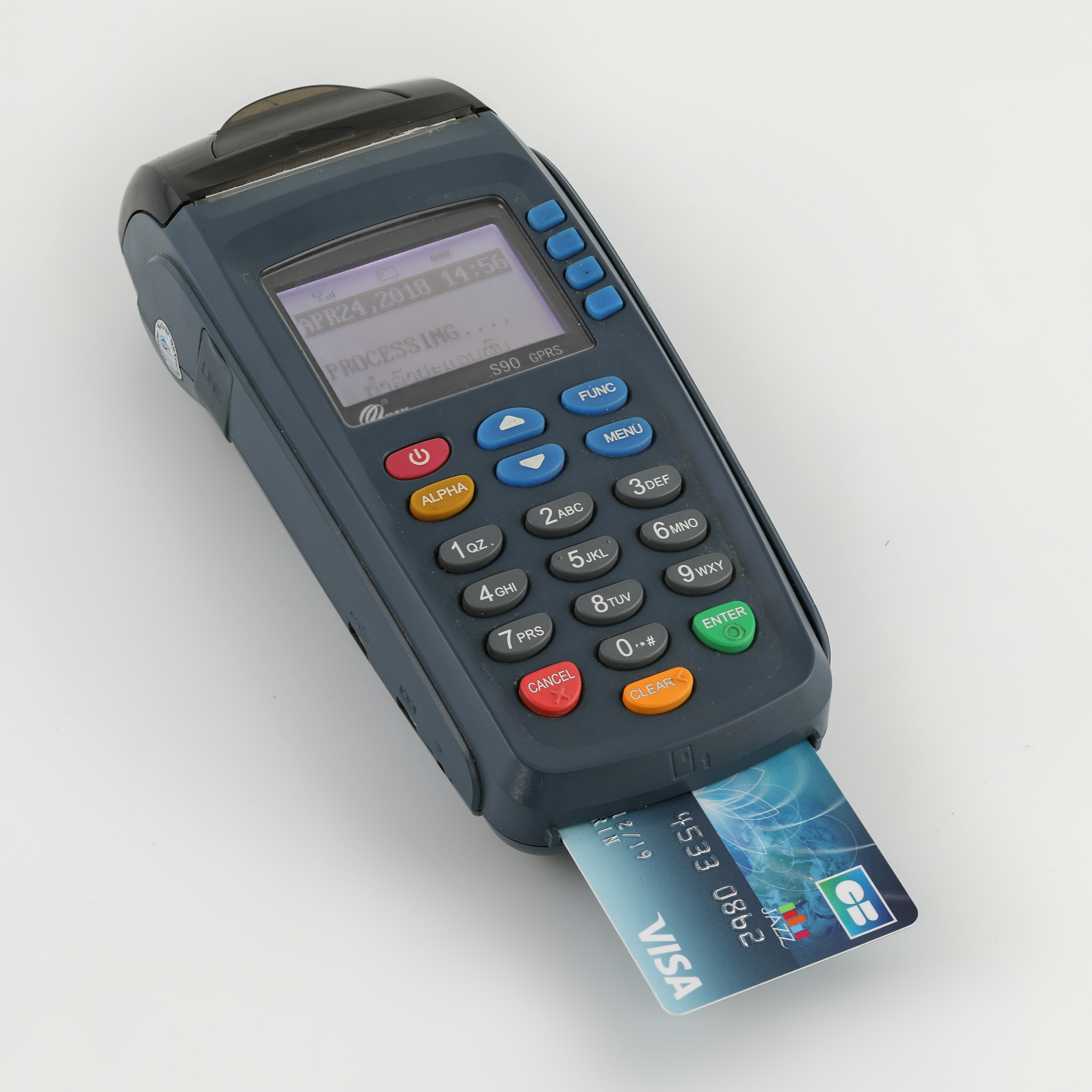
PAX Technology S90 payment terminal with a Visa card inserted.

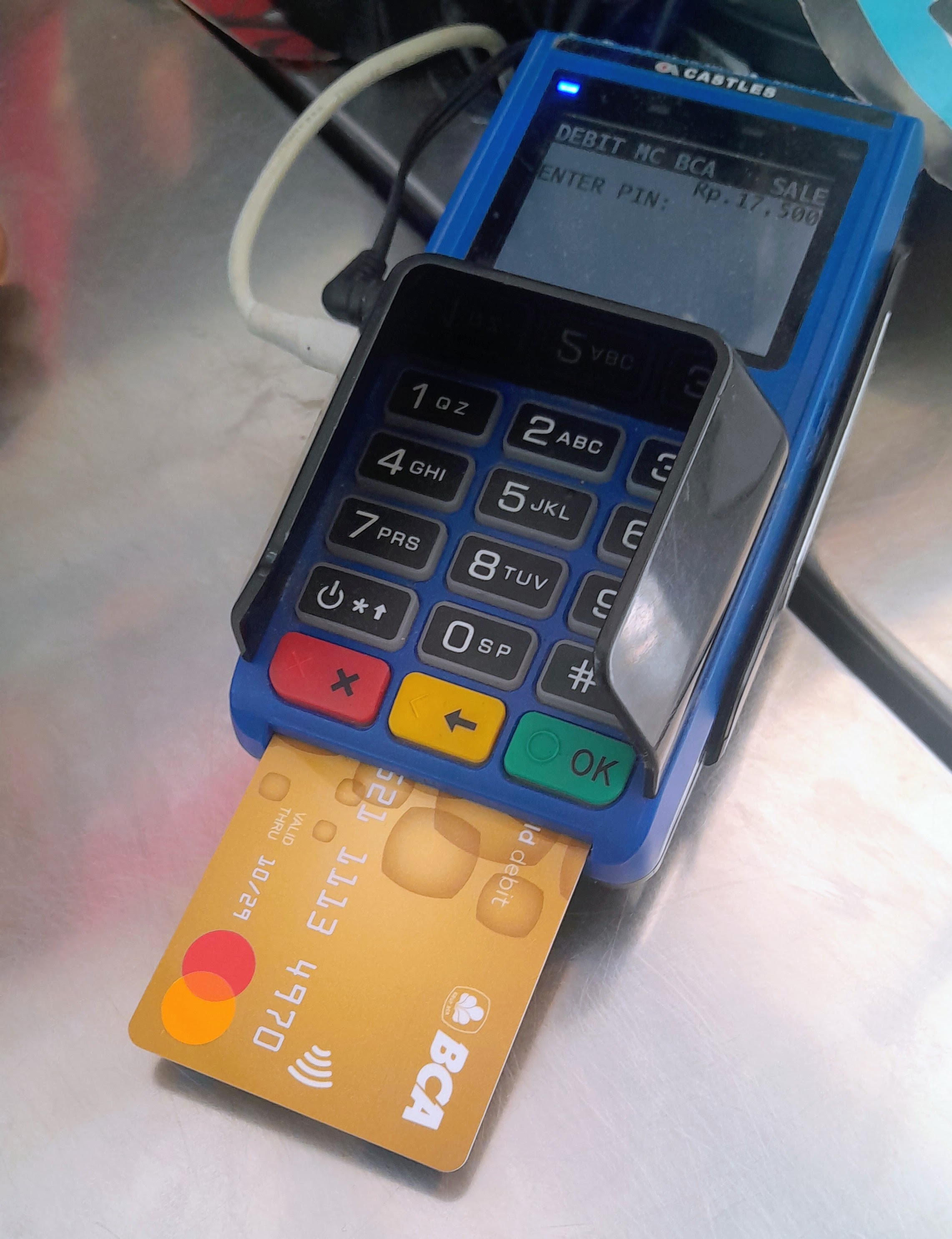
Castles Technology payment terminal with a Mastercard card inserted.

A payment terminal, also known as a point of sale (POS) terminal, card machine, credit card machine, card reader, PIN pad, EFTPOS terminal (or by the older term as PDQ terminal which stands for "Process Data Quickly"), is a device which interfaces with payment cards to make electronic funds transfers. The terminal typically consists of a secure keypad (called a PINpad) for entering PIN, a screen, a means of capturing information from payments cards and a network connection to access the payment network for authorization.

A payment terminal allows a merchant to capture required credit and debit card information and to transmit this data to the merchant services provider or bank for authorization and finally, to transfer funds to the merchant. The terminal allows the merchant or their client to swipe, insert or hold a card near the device to capture the information.

Card machines are often connected to point of sale systems so that payment amounts and confirmation of payment can be transferred automatically to the merchant's retail management system. Terminals can also be used in stand alone mode, where the merchant keys the amount into the terminal before the customer present their card and personal identification number (PIN).

The majority of card terminals today transmit data over cellular network connections and Wi-Fi. Legacy terminals communicate over standard telephone line or Ethernet connections. Some also have the ability to cache transactional data to be transmitted to the payment processor when a connection becomes available; the major drawback to this is that immediate authorization is not available at the time the card was processed, which can subsequently result in failed payments. Wireless terminals transmit card data using Bluetooth, Wi-Fi, cellular, or even satellite networks in remote areas and onboard airplanes.

Prior to the development of payment terminals, merchants would capture card information manually using ZipZap machines. The development of payment terminals was led by the advantage of efficiency by decreased transaction processing times and immediate authorisation of payments. In terms of security, terminals provide end to end card data encryption and auditing functions. Nevertheless, there have been some cases of POS pin pad malware. There have also been incidence of skimming at card terminals and this led to the move away from using the magnetic strip to instead capturing information using EMV standards.

== History ==
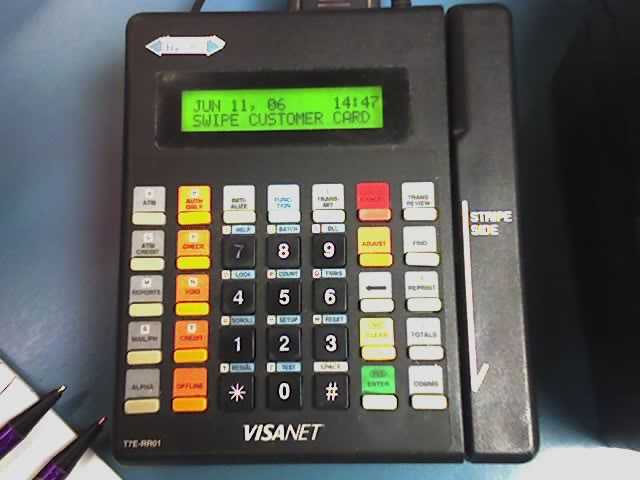
A fixed install Hypercom card terminal from 2006

Prior to the development of payment terminals, merchants would use manual imprinters (also known as ZipZap machines) to capture the information from the embossed information on a credit card onto a paper slip with carbon-paper copies. These paper slips had to be taken to the bank for processing. This was a cumbersome and time-consuming process.

Point of sale terminals emerged in 1979, when Visa introduced a bulky electronic data capturing terminal which was the first payment terminal. In the same year magnetic stripes were added to credit cards for the first time. This allowed card information to be captured electronically and led to the development of payment terminals.

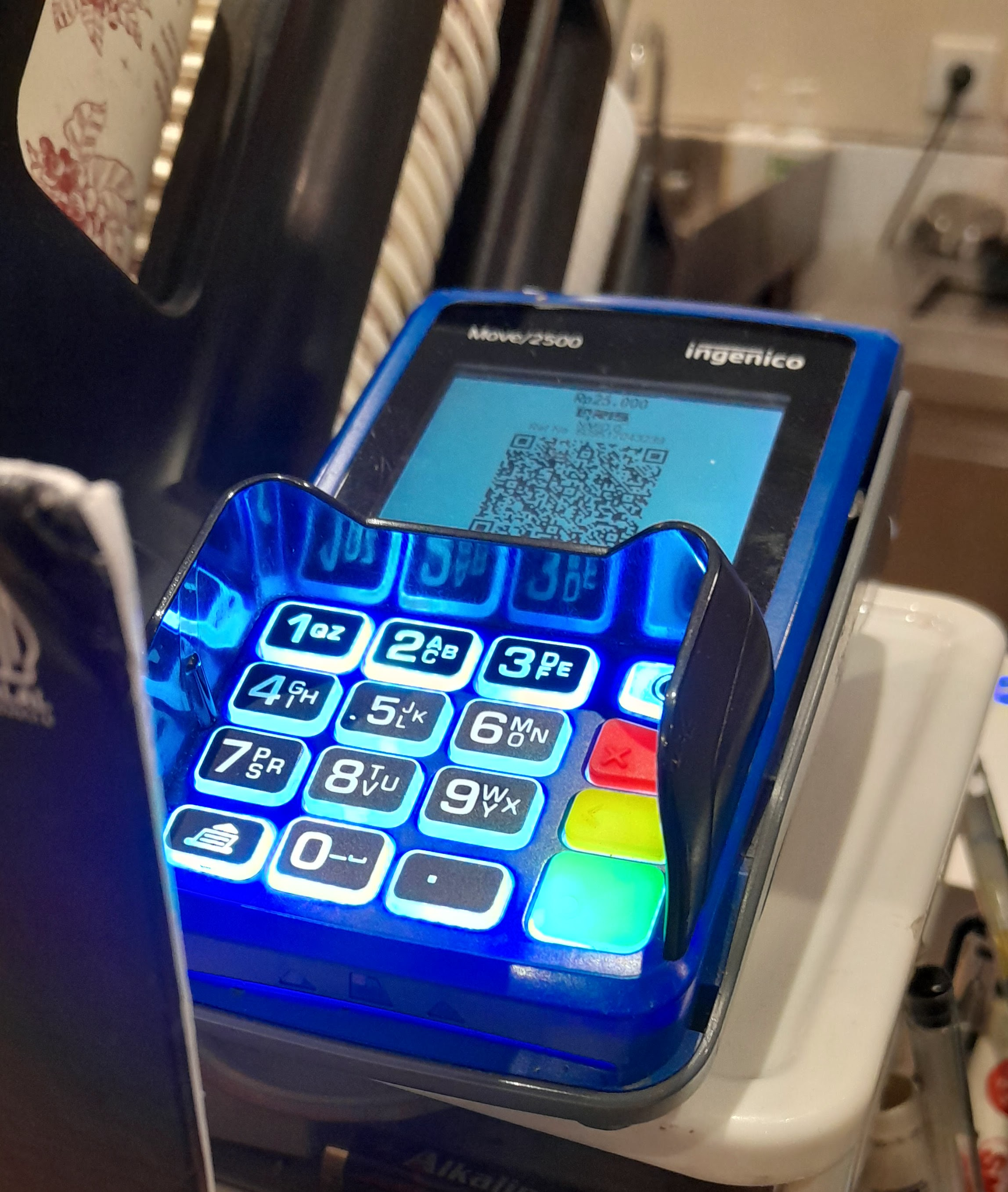
Ingenico Move/2500 payment terminal with a QRIS QR code payment

One of the first companies to produce dedicated payment terminals was Verifone. It started in 1981 in Hawaii as a small electronics company. In 1983 they introduced the ZON terminal series, which would become the standard for modern payment terminals.

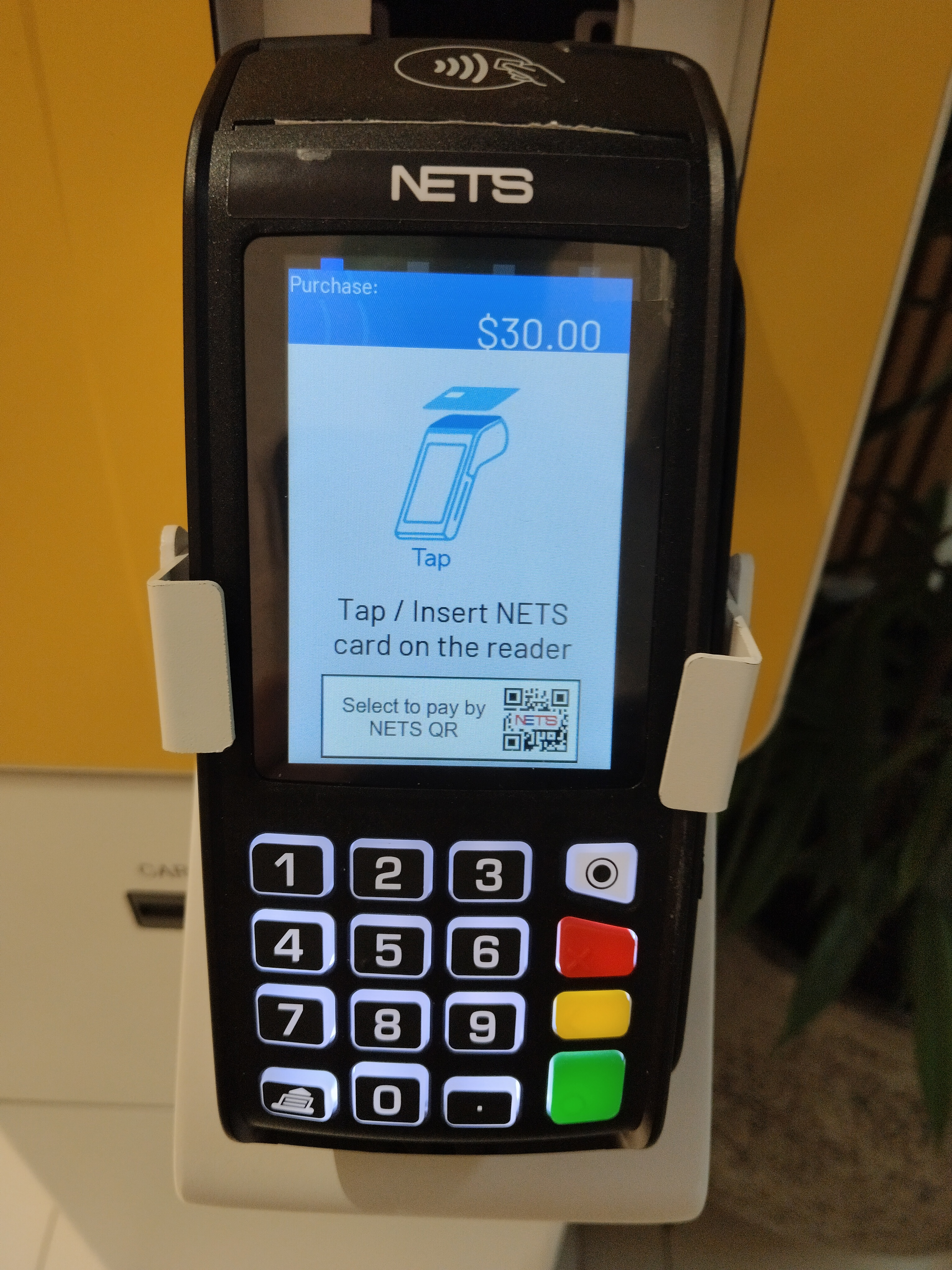
Payment screen on a Ingenico Desk 5000 terminal at a self-service top-up kiosk from 2025

Hungarian-born George Wallner in Sydney, Australia, founded rival Hypercom in 1978 and in 1982 started producing dedicated payment terminals. It went on to dominate the Oceania region. The company signed a deal with American Express to provide its terminals to them in the US. To consolidate the deal, Hypercom moved its head office from Australia to Arizona in the US. It then faced head-to-head competition with Verifone on its home market.

Over a decade later in 1994, Lipman Electronic Engineering was established in Israel. Lipman manufactured the Nurit line of processing terminals. Because of Verifone's already firm place in the payment processing industry when Lipman was established, Lipman targeted an untapped niche in the processing industry. While, Lipman held about a 10% share in wired credit card terminals, they were the undisputed leader, with more than 95% share in wireless processing terminals in the late 1990s.

Verifone would later acquire both of these major rivals, acquiring Lipman in 2006 and the payment part of the Hypercom business including its brand in 2011.

In 1980, Jean-Jacques Poutrel and Michel Malhouitre established Ingenico in France and developed their first payment terminal in 1984. Its Barcelona-based R&D unit would lead the development of payment terminals for the next decade. Ingenico, through a number of acquisitions, would dominate the European market for payment terminals for a number of years. They acquired French based Bull and UK based De La Rue payment terminal activity as well as German Epos in 2001.

Initially, information was captured from the magnetic strip on the back of the card, by swiping the card through the terminal. In the late 1990s, this started to be replaced by smart cards where an electronic chip was embedded in the card. This was done for added security and required the card to be inserted into the credit card terminal. In the late 1990s and early 2000s contactless payment systems were introduced and the payment terminals were updated to include the ability to read these cards using near field communication (NFC) technology.

== Typical features ==
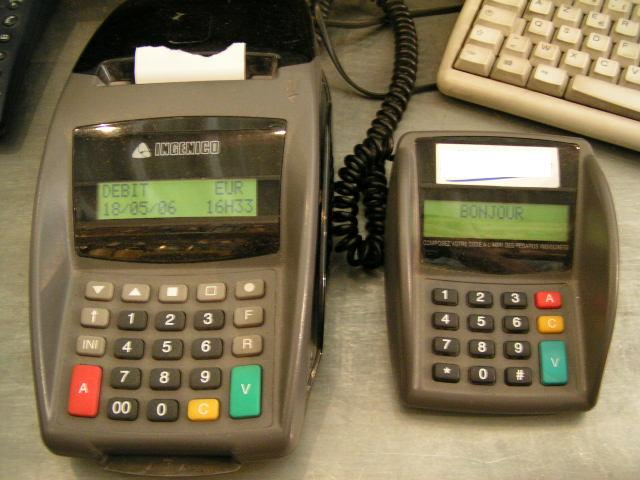
An older generation Ingenico credit card terminal and separate keypad from 2006

- Key entry (for customer not present mail and telephone order)
- Tips/gratuities
- Refunds and adjustments
- Settlement (including automatic)
- Pre-authorisation
- Payments using near field communication enabled devices
- Remote initialisation and software update
- Point of sale (POS) integration
- Multi-merchant capabilities
- Pen or PIN authorization by the customer
- Surcharge function
- Secure password operation
- Additional PIN pad attachments

Like automated teller machines, many payment terminals are also equipped with raised tactile buttons and an earphone jack which allow the blind to audibly finish the payment process.

== Major manufacturers ==
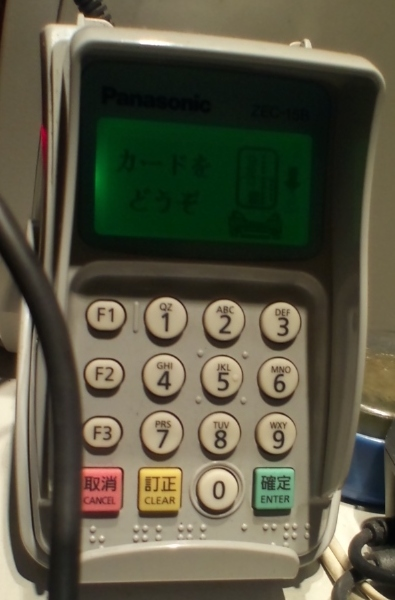
Legacy generation payment terminal

There are three main global players who offer both a wide range of payment terminals, sell worldwide, and continue to develop to the latest international payment industry standards. In most countries terminals are provided to merchants via a multitude of distributors that support and pre-configure devices to operate with local payment networks or financial institutions.

- Ingenico
- PAX Technology
- Verifone

== Alternatives ==
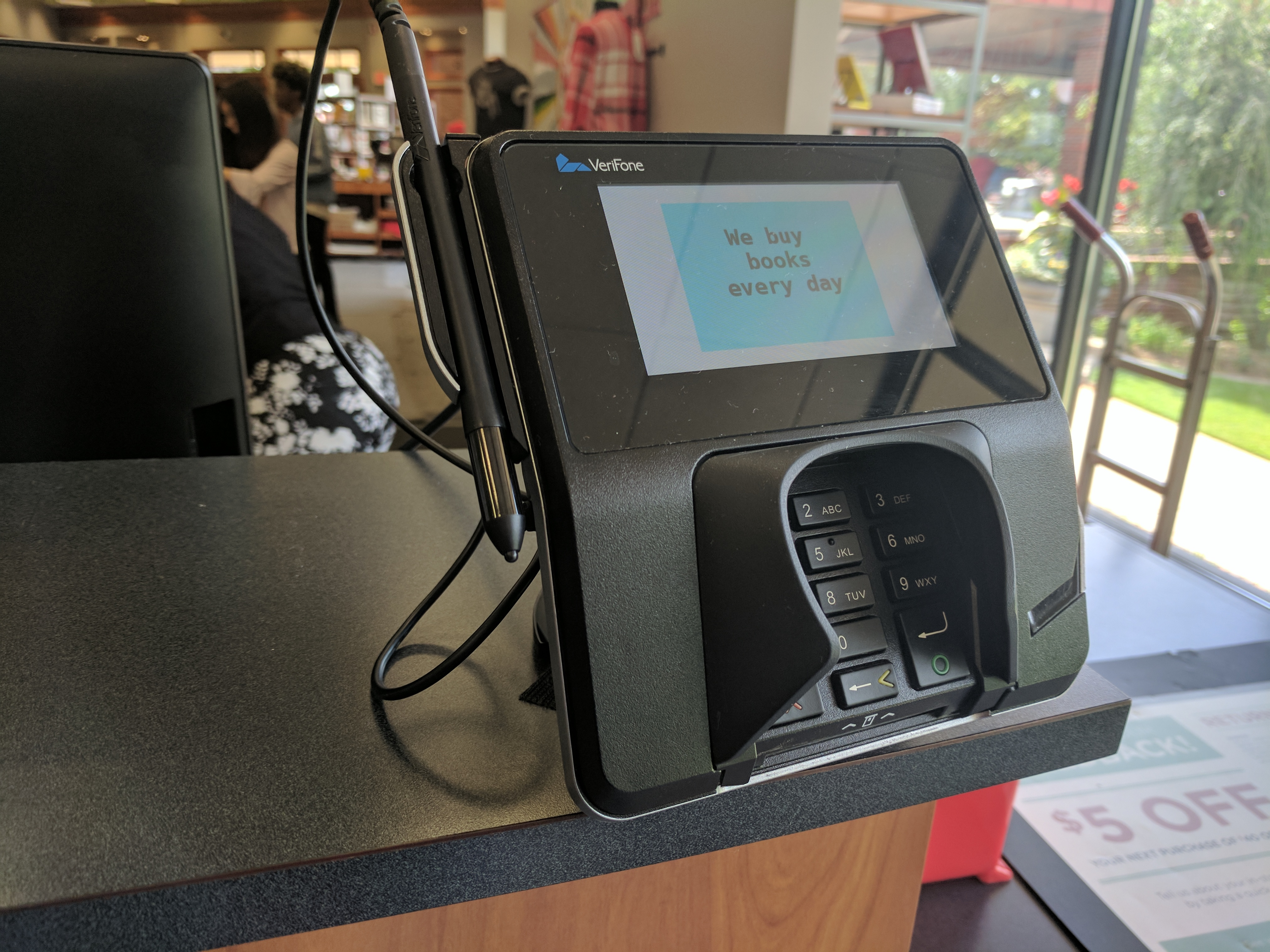
A touch screen based VeriFone MX 915 series payment terminal.

A merchant can replace the functionality of dedicated credit card terminal hardware using a terminal application running on a PC or mobile device, such as a smartphone. The payment acceptance applications are also called tap-on-phone or software point of sale. They usually work with dedicated hardware readers that can transfer magnetic stripe data to the application, while there are also some that also work with smart cards (using technology such as EMV), although this is rarely seen on smartphone readers.

In case the necessary hardware is unavailable, these applications usually support manual entry of the card number and other data. In addition, more and more devices are beginning to offer built-in RFID or NFC technology to accommodate contactless or mobile device payment methods, often without requiring additional external hardware.

Some payment processors offer virtual terminals for processing payments without the card being present, for example when taking payments over the phone.

Mobile payment systems such as those based on QR code payments bypass the need for payment terminals altogether, relying on smartphones and a printed QR code.

== See also ==
- Smart terminal
- EFTPOS
- Point of sale
- QR code payment
