= National Spot Exchange =

Indian Commodity exchange

National Spot Exchange Ltd.
- Type: Spot market
- Industry: Commodity Spot Trading
- Founded: 2008
- Defunct: 2013
- Headquarters: Mumbai, India
- Products: Spot exchange
- Owner: 63 Moons Technologies
- Website: www.nationalspotexchange.com

The National Spot Exchange Limited (NSEL) is India's first spot exchange under the ownership of 63 Moons Technologies. It was established in view of the then Prime Minister's vision to create a "single market" across the country for both manufactured and agricultural produce.

== History ==
NSEL was established in 2008 in view of the then Prime Minister's vision to create a "single market" across the country for both manufactured and agricultural produce.

The Economic Survey of 2002-03 of the Government of India also recommended setting up a national-level, integrated market for agricultural products, as did the Planning Commission. This was followed by the Rangarajan Committee, which too sought a national spot market.

The Government of India granted permission to NSEL, along with two other spot exchanges, to start operations. The Government of India issued a Gazette Notification dated 5 June 2007, granting a general exemption under Section 27 of the Forward Contracts Regulation Act .(FCRA)

NSEL commenced operations providing an electronic trading platform in October 2008 and simultaneously, as many as six state governments issued licenses under the model Agricultural Produce Market Committees (APMC) Act to NSEL.

In August 2011, the Forward Markets Commission (FMC) was appointed as the 'designated agency' to regulate these spot exchanges.

=== Abrupt Closure of NSEL ===
Immediately after being designated the agency to supervise and regulate spot exchanges by the MoCA, the FMC sought clarification from NSEL regarding the fulfillment of conditions stipulated under the exemption notification.

Despite the detail clarification given by the NSEL, the FMC wrongly, on 10 April 2012, sent a letter to MoCA misrepresenting facts and stating that NSEL had breached certain conditions of the exemption notification and in view thereof called upon the MoCA to take necessary action for such violation.

In view of this, on 27 April 2012, the MoCA issued show cause notice to NSEL. Responding twice to the show cause notice, NSEL wrote to the Ministry clarifying that the exemption granted to it under Section 27 of FCRA was general and not specific in nature.

Despite giving a detailed explanation, there was no communication from the Ministry's side for over a year and half. All said and done, the Ministry in a letter on 12 July 2013, pending legal advice, directed NSEL to halt launching of further and fresh contracts until further instruction from the concerned authority and to settle all existing contracts on the due dates.

=== 24 Defaulters and their Role ===
On 4 August 2013, the FMC Chairman Ramesh Abhishek had a meeting with defaulters and Brokers at Hotel Trident at BKC in Mumbai. After the meeting, Abhishek told the media: 'There are 23 such entities who owe Rs 5,400 crores to the exchange and through exchange to the people who put money there. Sixteen entities came today and we had detailed discussions with them about how they are going to repay the money and the schedule, etc. And, we found that most of them were willing to repay in as little time as possible for them.'

On 6 August 2013, the MoCA also issued a gazette notification giving omnibus powers to the FMC to take all actions necessary against all persons including defaulters, brokers, warehouses etc. for recovery.

After the exchange closed abruptly, 24 entities collectively failed to honour their commitment, giving rise to a payment default of Rs 5,600 crore. The 24 entities also defaulted on their obligations after promising FMC Chairman Abhishek at the 4 August 2013 meeting that they will repay their dues in a phased manner. Instead of repaying the money, the defaulters diverted the proceeds of this crime into parallel businesses.

Later, On 22 August 2014, the Bombay High Court categorically stated 'The money invested has not come to NSEL, but has gone to the borrowers. i.e. bogus sellers. It is the borrowers who have been benefitted by the transactions and the money of 'investors' have gone to them. The names of 25 different companies who are the defaulters have been mentioned in the FIR itself. Thus, though projected a 'scam of Rs. 5600 crores', the ill-gotten amount has not gone to the applicant (Jignesh Shah) or for that matter, to NSEL.'

Even the investigating agencies including the Enforcement Directorate (ED) and the Economic Offences Wing (EOW) of the Mumbai Police have traced the entire money trail of Rs. 5,600 crore to the 24 defaulters. Not a single paisa has been found with NSEL, FTIL or its founder.

On 5 August 2016, in a written reply in Lok Sabha, the then Union Minister of State in Finance, Shri Arjun Ram Meghwal also stated that 'The entire amount which is gone to the brokers and defaulters belong to the 13,000 investors.'

=== How Brokers mis-sold NSEL Products, Manipulated KYCs ===
In the NSEL crisis, big brokers have many irregularities by mis-selling the products, misrepresenting the facts and manipulating the KYC and modifying the client code. Considering the multiple complaints against the misdeeds of the brokers, in 2016, SEBI cracked the whip on the top powerful brokers by initiating an audit against those who sold NSEL contracts to their clients often presenting them as an assured return product, which in reality, were not. Five top brokers are under scanner as they have the highest exposure to NSEL from 2011 to 2013.

These brokers have been facing the regulatory heat, as SEBI has issued show cause notice for various irregularities done by them. The charges against these brokers are as follows:

1. False assurance, inducement and misrepresentation
2. Trading without client authority
3. Misuse of Unique Client Code
4. Funding with or without the consent of the trading client
5. Trades not matching with the records of NSEL
6. Non-receipt of the pay-outs
7. Manipulation of ledger accounts
8. Fabrication of client's KYC documents
9. Threats of submitting incorrect information

SEBI has issued two show-cause notices to the top five brokers namely Anand Rathi Commodities, India Infoline Commodities (IIFL), Geofin Comtrade, Motilal Oswal Commodities, and Phillip Commodities, on charges of mis-selling NSEL contracts by promising assured returns without ensuring delivery. They also allegedly modified client codes for doing multiple deals. In the notice, SEBI asked these brokers as to why they should not be declared not "fit and proper" since they were found to have violated securities regulations.

The Economic Offences Wing (EOW) of Mumbai Police also found evidence of large-scale irregularities on the part of these brokers in the National Spot Exchange Ltd (NSEL) case. A forensic audit by the EOW also revealed hawala transactions, benami trades and client code modifications by these brokers. Incidentally, NSEL never ever offered assured return product. In fact, NSEL had repeatedly warned these members about selling contracts as assured return products to its trading clients and cautioned them not to offer any assured returns. NSEL had issued circulars cautioning its members to refrain from offering any such contracts by offering assured returns.

In February 2019, five major brokerages were declared 'not fit and proper' by SEBI as commodity derivative brokers through several orders. According to the first two separate orders, SEBI stated that the reputation of Motilal Oswal Commodities Broker and India Infoline Commodities has been "seriously eroded", which is indispensable in declaring them "not fit and proper" for commodity trading.

Soon after that, Geofin Comtrade and Anand Rathi Commodities were declared 'not fit and proper' in the second set of orders. The same orders were issued against Phillip Commodities India. These firms have been found guilty for violating the erstwhile Forward Contract and Regulation Act (FCRA) 1972.

As a result, these firms are disallowed to act as brokers, indirectly or directly.

=== The Actuality of 13,000 Trading Clients ===
In the NSEL case, there have been claims of 13,000 trading clients who have faced monetary losses. However, the authenticity or genuineness of these so-called investors is under scrutiny.

Many brokerage firms misused and cheated the trading clients by misrepresenting facts, mis-selling NSEL contracts and also misusing the KYC of trading clients without their knowledge and as a result of which, trapped them of huge exposures on the NSEL platform.

On 27 June 2016, some trading clients received notices from the income-tax department seeking details, among others, of source of funds, bad debt claimed during assessment years 2014-15 and 2015–16 and their transactions made on NSEL. According to the report in The Economic Times, the letter terms the claims by traders, brokers, and their nonbanking finance companies "illegal", "multiple" and for "bogus losses". It said the Rs 2,000-3,000 crore worth claims were causing losses to the exchequer.

On 12 December 2016, in a written reply to a question in Lok Sabha, the then Minister of State for Finance, Shri Arjun Ram Meghwal also made it clear that the veracity of these investors is being looked into. He stated, "The EOW, Mumbai has the data of 12,768 investors, who claimed to have lost monies in NSEL. The verification of genuineness of investors can be done through the examination of the Know-Your-Customer (KYC) documents". Mr Meghwal further clarified that the Income Tax Department, which is also investigating the investors, has not given a clean chit to any of these investors.

The Hon. Bombay High Court appointed committee has also questioned the genuineness of the trading clients and whether in fact there are 13,000 trading clients who have reportedly suffered due to the crisis. In addition, the Serious Fraud Investigation Office (SFIO) has sought detailed answers from the 13,000 so-called investors to uncover if the brokers induced them to trade in the commodities spot exchange. The 6-page questionnaire also wants answers on the non-payment of value-added tax at the time of trading.

=== Recovery by NSEL ===
- NSEL has been successful in obtaining decrees on admission against 5 defaulters from the Hon. Bombay High Court, to the tune of Rs. 1,233.02 crore
- NSEL has helped in tracked the assets of defaulters and secured injunctions against the assets of 18 defaulters from the Bombay High Court in respect of claims of Rs. 4515.93 crore
- NSEL has already cleared 100% dues of all trading clients (so-called investors) who had an exposure of up to Rs. 2 lakh
- NSEL has also cleared 50% of the claim amount of each of 6,445 trading clients (so-called investors) having claims of Rs. 2 lakh to Rs. 10 lakh
- Thus, NSEL, with the help of its parent company 63 Moons Technologies Limited, has given relief to 7,053 trading clients
- NSEL has filed various cases including recover suits against the defaulting members before different forums, civil as well as criminal. These proceedings are pending at different stages and NSEL is taking appropriate steps for quick redressal.

=== Supreme Court sets aside Merger Order of NSEL-FTIL ===
Despite all the measures taken by NSEL, the FMC has misinformed the Ministry of Consumer Affairs that NSEL does not have resources, financial or organisational capability to recover the dues of the trading members. On 12 February 2016, the MCA issued the Final Order to forcefully amalgamate NSEL with its publicly listed parent, FTIL, completely undermining and ignoring the interest of FTIL's 63,000+ shareholders in spite of their vehement opposition to the forced merger.

On 15 February 2016, The Hindu Business Line in its editorial stated: 'The use of Section 396 of the Companies Act to push through the merger also sets a bad precedent. The centre has used this tool four times in the past, but it was done sensibly, and in a manner that protected the interests of both the entities being merged. NSEL, which has no operations currently, will only saddle FTIL with additional liabilities; this is against the interest of the minority shareholders of the company. Ironically, this is being done to protect investors savvy enough to trade on a commodity exchange.'

On 16 February 2016, The Economic Times in its editorial stated: 'The government has set a bad precedent with the forcible merger it has ordered of National Spot Exchange Ltd (NSEL) into its promoter company, Financial Technologies (India) Ltd (FTIL). There are three problems with the move. One, it would go down as an instance of rare executive high-handedness, if it were to emerge, in the judicial challenge and resolution of the dispute that will now ensue, that this was not the right thing to do. Two, the natural order of priority for recovery of the outstanding dues of some Rs 5,600 crore owed to some traders would begin with the defaulting traders, proceed to the brokers involved and then the exchange, but the government has short-circuited the sequence by fixing the responsibility on the exchange and then shifting it to its promoter company. Three, the concept of limited liability, a cornerstone of modern entrepreneurship, stands revealed as having limited value in India's regulatory apparatus.

On 4 December 2017, the Bombay High Court dismissed the petition filed by 63 moons technologies, previously FTIL, to oppose the forced merger of NSEL with FTIL.

Later, in a significant judgement, the apex court decided against the forced merger of NSEL and FTIL that was ordered by the Ministry of Corporate Affairs, which was the first ever instance of invocation of Section 396 of the Companies Act 1956. The Union Ministry had ordered the compulsory amalgamation of National Spot Exchange Ltd (NSEL) and its parent company Financial Technologies India Ltd, currently known as 63 Moons Technology Limited. Justice Rohinton Fali Nariman and Justice Vineet Saran set aside the Bombay High Court's judgment on amalgamating the two companies. The centre had issued a final order for the merger in the light of public interest. However, the Supreme Court reckoned that the merger doesn't satisfy the criteria of 'public interest' and laid down a set of guidelines on what 'public interest' would amount to.

=== 63 moons filed Rs 10,000 crore damage suits against P. Chidambaram ===
On 30 July 2019, The Bombay High Court summoned P. Chidambaram, the former Union Finance Minister and two other bureaucrats, K.P. Krishnan and Ramesh Abhishek, regarding the Rs 10,000 crore damage suits filed by 63 moons technologies and their role in the NSEL payment default crisis. They have been asked to remain present in the court on 15 October 2019.
