= Motilal Oswal Financial Services =

Indian diversified financial services firm

Motilal Oswal Financial Services Limited

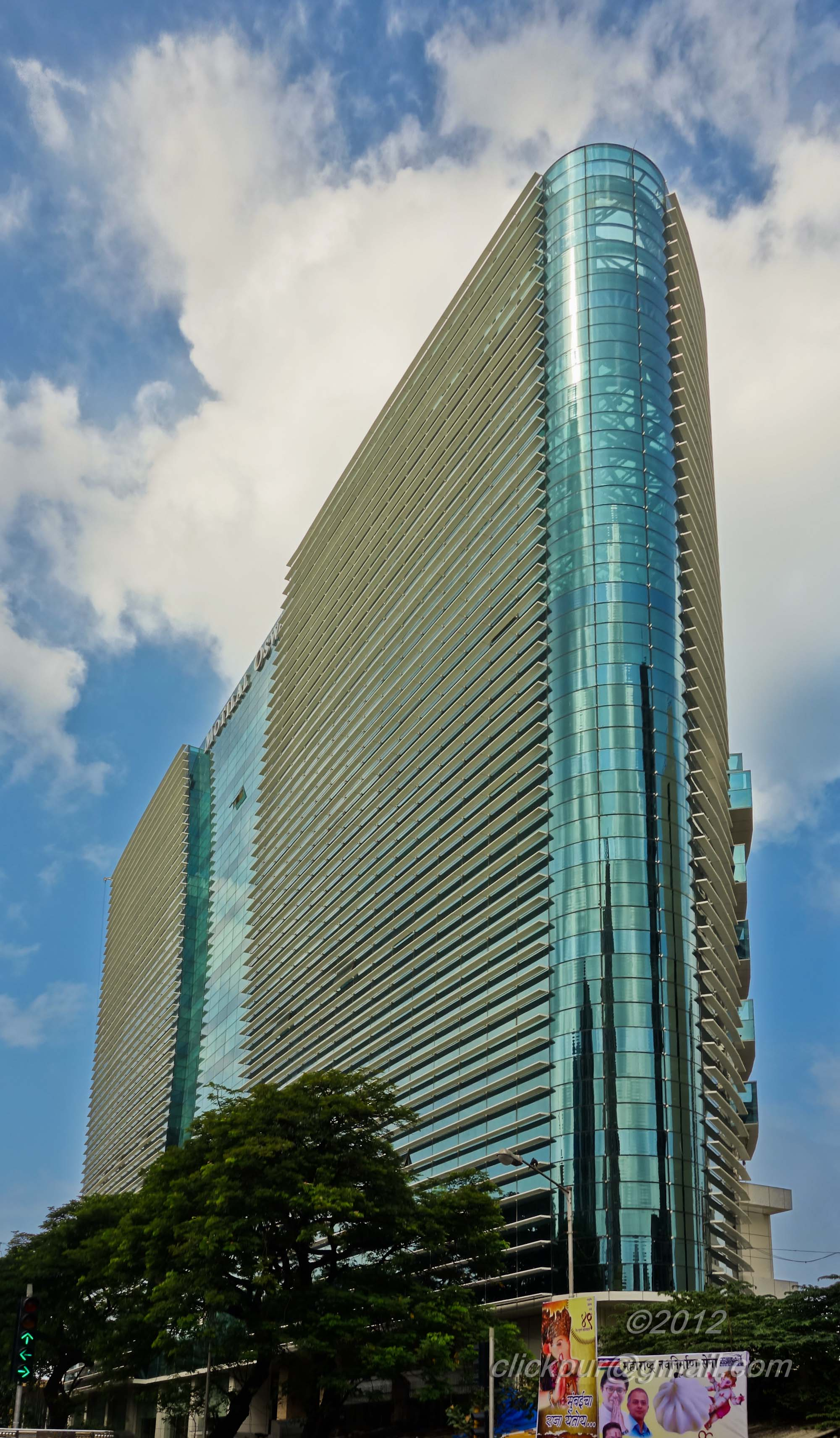
- Motilal Oswal building in Lower Parel, Mumbai
- Type: Public
- Traded as: BSE: 532892; NSE: MOTILALOFS
- ISIN: INE338I01027
- Industry: Financial services
- Founded: 1987; 39 years ago
- Founder: Motilal Oswal; Raamdeo Agrawal
- Headquarters: Motilal Oswal Tower, Prabhadevi, Mumbai, Maharashtra
- Key people: Raamdeo Agrawal (Chairman); Motilal Oswal (CEO)
- Products: Stockbroker; Commodity Broker; Asset Management; Wealth Management; Investment Management; Investment Banking; Private Equity; Mortgage loans; Insurance
- Revenue: ▲₹4,178 crore (US$430 million) (2023)
- Operating income: ▲₹1,877 crore (US$190 million) (2023)
- Net income: ▲₹935 crore (US$97 million) (2023)
- AUM: ▲₹45,620 crore (US$4.7 billion) (2023)
- Total assets: ▲₹22,949 crore (US$2.4 billion) (2023)
- Total equity: ▲₹6,142 crore (US$640 million) (2023)
- Owner: Promotor (69.53% stake): Motilal Oswal; Raamdeo Agrawal
- Number of employees: 7,303 (2023)
- Website: motilaloswalgroup.com

Motilal Oswal Financial Services Limited is an Indian financial services company offering a range of financial products and services headquartered in Prabhadevi, Mumbai. The company was founded by Motilal Oswal and Raamdeo Agrawal in 1987.

The company was listed on the stock exchange on September 11,2007, after its initial public offering (IPO).

== History ==
Motilal Oswal Financial Services was set up by Motilal Oswal and Raamdeo Agrawal as a broking house in 1987.

The company entered into investment banking in 2005, followed by private equity fund in 2006.

In February 2006, the company acquired Peninsular Capital Markets, a Cochin, Kerala based broking company for Rs. 35 crore. The company tied up with State Bank of India in 2006, Punjab National Bank in 2007 and Axis Bank in 2013 to offer online trading to its customers.

In 2007, the company went public via IPO; the IPO was featured as a case study in Harvard Business School.

In January 2010, the company set up a mutual fund business named as Motilal Oswal Asset Management Company (MOAMC).

In 2013, the company established Aspire Home Finance Corporation Limited (AHFCL). The company offers loans for home, construction, composite, improvement and extension in India.

In February 2024, Motilal Oswal Financial Services faced a cyberattack by the ransomware group LockBit, which claimed to have accessed confidential data. This breach could affect the information of over six million clients and put at risk data related to the company's asset management and investment banking operations.

== Management ==
Position	Personnel
Founder and CEO of Motilal Group	Motilal Oswal
Co-founder and Chairman of Motilal Group	Raamdeo Agrawal
Managing Director at MOFSL Group	Navin Agarwal
CEO of Investment Banking	Amit Ramchandani
CEO of Institutional Equities	Rajat Rajgarhia
CEO of Broking	Ajay Menon

== Listings and Shareholdings ==
The equity shares of Motilal Oswal Financial Services are listed on the Bombay Stock Exchange, and the National Stock Exchange of India.

Shareholders (as on 31-12-2022)	Shareholding (%)
Promoters	69.47%
Mutual Funds	05.89%
Financial Institution/Banks/Insurance	00.00%
Foreign Institutional Investors (FII)	07.35%
Corporate Bodies	00.72%
Individuals	09.15%
NRIs/OCBs	00.38%
ADRs/GDRs	NIL
Others	7.04%
Total	100%

== Products and services ==
Motilal Oswal provides products and services related to equity trading, commodity trading and investment advisory services, IPOs and SIPs investment, portfolio management services, and mutual funds investment. Motilal Oswal's client base was around 7.3 million at the end of June 2024.

== Controversies ==
Motilal Oswal along with a few other top brokers have been accused of various irregularities on the NSEL case. Agencies including the Economic Offence Wing-Mumbai and SFIO have found the top 5 brokers including Motilal Oswal guilty of misselling NSEL contracts, KYC manipulation, client code modification, illegal transactions & infusion of black money through their NBFCs on the Exchange platform. The EOW had arrested senior employees of three brokers namely IIFL, Geofin Comtrade & Anand Rathi in March, 2015. This was followed by the market regulator, SEBI issuing multiple show-cause notices to the brokers in 2016, 2017, 2018 and 2019 respectively. The EOW-Mumbai in its supplementary charge sheet has also accused the three brokers IIFL, Motilal Oswal & Anand Rathi of cheating clients. Based on the recommendations of SFIO & EOW against misdeeds of these brokers, SEBI declared Motilal Oswal along with India Infoline Commodities (IIFL) ‘not fit and proper’ as commodity derivative brokers, in the last week of February 2019.

In May 2022, SEBI imposed a fine of INR 2.5 million on Motilal Oswal for misutilization of client funds and incorrect reporting of margins.
