= NSEL case =

Financial scandal in India

National Spot Exchange Limited (NSEL) case relates to a payment default at the National Spot Exchange Limited that occurred in 2013 involving Financial Technologies India Ltd, when a payment default took place after a commodities market regulator, the Forward Markets Commission (FMC), directed NSEL to stop launching contracts. This led to the closure of the Exchange in July 2013.

Three spot exchanges, NSEL, NSPOT and National APMC were exempted by the government under Section 27 of FCRA to conduct forward trading in one day contracts. This was done to boost volumes so that their economic viability improved. While Financial Technologies (India) promoted NSEL, it was granted general exemption on 5 June 2007, whereas, NSPOT and National APMC received exemptions under the same provisions on 23 July 2008, and 11 August 2010, respectively. On the flawed recommendations of the FMC, the Ministry of Consumer Affairs ordered NSEL to settle all existing contracts and not launch any fresh contracts, which led to the crisis.

Investigations led by the Enforcement Directorate and Economic Offences Wing (EOW) revealed the role of brokers and defaulters in the NSEL case. The brokers mis-sold NSEL products to their clients by assuring them fixed returns. The defaulters hypothecated stocks, produced fake warehouse receipts and siphoned the entire default money.

Initially, it was projected that there were 13,000 trading clients affected by the NSEL crisis. The genuineness and entitlement of these 13,000 trading clients is questionable. The brokers have not shown the Know Your Customer details of any of the clients. The Bombay High Court suggested that brokers should furnish this data to NSEL in order to protect interest of genuine claimants. Considering this aspect, SFIO which is also investigating the case, has recently asked brokers and trading clients to provide various information in a specific format which also includes KYC related information.

On 30 July 2019, The Bombay High Court summoned P. Chidambaram, the former Union Finance Minister and two other bureaucrats, K.P. Krishnan and Ramesh Abhishek, regarding the ₹10,000 crore damage suits filed by 63 moons technologies and their role in the NSEL payment default crisis. The Bombay High Court has accepted the plea and allowed 63 Moons to sue Chidambaram and the others.

== History ==
Pursuant to the then Prime Minister's vision to create a single market across the country for both manufactured and agricultural produce, NSEL (National Spot Exchange Limited) was conceptualized in the year 2004. According to the Economic Surveys of the government done in 2003–2006, 3 consecutive years of survey also recommended setting up a national-level, integrated market for agricultural products, as did the planning commission, which was aware of the benefits of the spot markets. This was followed by the Rangarajan Committee, which too sought a national spot market.

Following the invitation from Ministry of Consumer Affairs (MCA), the Multi Commodities Exchange Ltd. (MCX) which was earlier a sister company of NSEL, submitted a project report for establishing a nationwide spot market for commodities. NSEL was set up as a company incorporated under the Companies Act, 1956 on 18 May 2005 with its registered office in the State of Maharashtra. NSEL was incorporated by MCX and the nominees of FTIL.

Subsequently, in view of the regulatory concerns between regulated commodities exchanges holding equity shareholding in spot exchanges, the shareholding of MCX and nominees were transferred and consolidated later in 2005 with FTIL. On 5 June 2007, NSEL was approved as a Spot Exchange by Department of Consumer Affairs. National Spot Exchange Limited (NSEL), commenced live trading on 15 October 2008, and was the first commodity spot exchange of the country. Within a few years, as many as six state governments issued licences under the model Agricultural Produce Market Committees (APMC) Act to NSEL, because their own APMCs mostly short-changed the poor farmers. NSEL turned out to be a boon for such farmers because they could now sell their produce at competitive rates and make better profits.

The Exchange was promoted by National Agricultural Cooperative Marketing Federation of India. In August 2011, FMC was appointed as the ‘designated agency’ to fill the regulatory vacuum in the commodities market. A series of bizarre actions by the FMC spooked the market and as a result NSEL had to suspend the trading of all contracts on 31 July 2013

=== Investors' activisms ===
The investors of NSEL formed an organization by the name of NSEL Investor's Forum (NIF) in the month of August 2013. However investors who were dissatisfied with brokers' role in NIF formed a pure investors' organization by the name of NSEL Investors' Action Group (NIAG). Many writs, PILs, Suits have been filed in Mumbai HC against NSEL/FTIL and Jignesh Shah.

== Bankruptcy ==
=== Investigation by EOW Mumbai ===
As of 2019, the EOW (Economic Offences Wing) of Mumbai Police was investigating this crisis and the Mumbai police has conducted various raids. On 9 October 2013, Amit Mukherjee, the Assistant Vice-president (Business Development) of NSEL, was arrested by the EOW of the Mumbai police marking the first arrest in the payment crisis. Subsequently, a day later on 10 October 2013, the EOW of Mumbai Police arrested Jai Bahukhandi, the former Assistant Vice-president of NSEL. Former CEO and MD, Anjani Sinha, was arrested a week later on 17 October 2013. The EOW has since invoked the MPID (Maharashtra Protection of Investors Deposit) Act, under which it can attach properties and assets of the accused, for the interest of the investors. Nilesh Patel of NK Proteins Ltd., the biggest borrower from the NSEL, was arrested on 22 October 2013 who got out on bail subsequently. Surinder Gupta of PD Agroprocessors was arrested by EOW on 5 March 2014.

The EOW also arrested Rajesh Mehta of Swastik Overseas Ahmedabad who was one of the borrowers on 1 April 2014. On 6 January 2014, the EOW of Mumbai's crime branch submitted its first chargesheet in connection with NSEL payment crisis. The chargesheet mentions the names of the following five accused:

- Amit Mukherjee (Former VP, Business Development at NSEL)
- Jay Bahukhandi (former AVP at NSEL)
- Anjani Sinha (Former Chief Executive of NSEL)
- Nilesh Patel (MD of NK Proteins)
- Arunkumar Sharma (Promoter and Director of Lotus Refineries)

In October 2013, EOW registered a case under the MPID Act in the NSEL case. In the process, EOW attached defaulters' properties worth close to ₹4,500 crore across the country, and the MPID court initiated procedures to liquidate them so as to recover dues of depositors. The ED has attached properties of defaulters, worth around ₹800 crores in NSEL case.

The EOW arrested defaulter borrowers Nilesh Patel (NK Proteins), Arun Sharma (Lotus Refineries), Surinder Gupta (PD Agro) and Indrajit Namdhari (Namdhari Foods). On 11 August 2014, the EOW arrested the following officials from six defaulting companies on NSEL:

- Kailash Aggarwal (Ark Imports)
- Narayanam Nageswara Rao (NCS Sugar)
- B V H Prasad (Juggernaut Projects)
- Varun Gupta (Vimladevi Agrotech)
- Chandra Mohan Singhal (Vimladevi Agrotech)
- Ghantakameshwar Rao (Spin-cot Textiles)
- Prashant Boorugu (Metcore Steel and Alloys)

The EOW arrested Shah and Shreekant Javalgekar on 7 May 2014, on charges of non-cooperation Reports however suggested that Shah was fully cooperative with EOW and had gone to EOW office 21 times against being summoned 7 times. Not only that, in order to facilitate the probe, NSEL had also deployed server in EOW office.

He was released on bail on 22 August 2014, by the Bombay High Court. The court observed that "…the names of 25 different companies who are the defaulters have been mentioned in the FIR itself". Thus, though projected payment default of ₹5,600 Cr, the ill-gotten amount has not gone to the applicant (Jignesh Shah), or for that matter, to NSEL.

The Enforcement Directorate arrested him on 12 July 2016 for assisting NSEL defaulters in money laundering. A special PMLA court granted bail to Shah terming the arrest by ED was ‘illegal’. After hearing both sides, Judge P.R. Bhavake, Special PMLA Court, Mumbai, ruled: "The learned counsel for the ED failed to satisfy me that this arrest is for a separate crime… I do not find any force in the contention that the ED wanted to file a supplementary complaint against the applicant (Shah) in respect of the investigation made against him as Chairman of FTIL. The ED has come with specific averments that the applicant is not arrested in special PMLA case no 04/2015 but in other Enforcement Case Information Report (ECIR). The ED has failed to satisfy the Court how the applicant’s arrest is legal in different ECIR....."

On 18 January 2021, the EOW arrested Anjani Sinha, former CEO of National Spot Exchange Ltd, for fictitious trading on the exchange and for creating false stocks.

==== Sucheta Dalal's knowledge of NSEL case ====
It was discovered that even 15 months before the NSEL case went public, India's financial journalist Sucheta Dalal knew all major aspects of the fraud. An email dated 8 May 2012 from Sucheta to Jignesh Shah, Anjani Shah etc. came in public domain which revealed that Sucheta knew about illegality and lack of safety of NSEL product. A complaint has been filed with Mumbai police by NSEL Investors' Action Group to investigate Sucheta Dalal's role. Sucheta knew about illegality of contracts, role of IBMA and the fact that the warehouses were in so called borrowers' own premises.

=== Investigation by Central Bureau of Investigation ===
The Central Bureau of Investigation raided NSEL and borrowers' offices as well as the residence of Jignesh Shah. An FIR was booked under prevention of corruption act for the funds that MMTC and PEC, two public sector units, were made to invest in NSEL. Jignesh Shah and Joseph Massey have been booked in this FIR. The investors have argued that CBI has taken no action against politicians/bureaucrats involved in the case. The CBI has filed a charge sheet where they have charged 20 entities, including Jignesh Shah and FTIL, for cheating PSUs, PEC and MMTC in the NSEL case.

=== Investigation by Serious Fraud Investigation Office ===
In 2016, the Government of India ordered Serious Fraud Investigation Office probe on FTIL and its 18 associates, brokers and defaulters pertaining to irregularities on NSEL.

=== Forensic audits by Choksi and Choksi ===
After petition by certain investors who wanted to derail the Eseries settlement by NSEL, the Bombay High Court directed the FMC to appoint a forensic auditor for Eseries products of NSEL. An audit firm by the name of Choksi and Choksi was given this assignment and their audit report had given a clean chit regarding the Eseries contracts on NSEL, which made the FMC give a NOC for Eseries settlement and over 40,000 genuine claimants of Eseries benefitted eventually.

== Allegation on investigative agencies and the government ==
The investors of NSEL formed an organization by the name of NIF in the month of August 2013. However investors who were dissatisfied with brokers’ role in NIF formed a pure investors’ organization by the name of NIAG (NSEL Investors Action Group). The NIAG has written multiple letters to Enforcement Directorate and CBI alleging lax and compromised investigation.

A Delhi PMLA Appellate Tribunal on 17 September 2019, directed that a provisional attachment by the Enforcement Directorate in 2016-2017 of over Rs 1,000 crore assets belonging to Jignesh Shah headed 63 moons technologies be quashed and the assets released. The action came in response to an appeal filed by the company. The order was passed by Justice Manmohan Singh, chairman of the tribunal along with member G C Mishra.

=== Suspected foul play in detecting NSEL-FTIL email data/servers ===
There are serious allegations on Mumbai Police EOW of tampering with NSEL-FTIL email servers. While earlier it was confirmed by Rajvardhan Sinha of Mumbai EOW that the mail server of NSEL/FTIL has crashed and has been sent to Bangalore for investigation. Ketan Shah, the man leading NSEL investors' association NIAG, has leveled charges on the investigating agencies of misleading the court. The EOW of Mumbai Police has appointed Mahindra Defence Arm as the digital forensic auditor to probe the NSEL crisis.

== The roles of involved parties ==
=== The role of the brokers ===
SEBI has issued show-cause notices to the top five brokers namely Anand Rathi Commodities, India Infoline Commodities (IIFL), Geofin Comtrade, Motilal Oswal Commodities, and Phillip Commodities, on charges of mis-selling NSEL contracts by promising assured returns without ensuring delivery.

Since the brokers have also been accused of indulging in massive manipulation of client KYCs, large-scale modification of client codes for doing multiple deals and infusion of unaccounted money through their NBFCs, SEBI has asked them as to why they should not be declared not "fit and proper" since they were found to have violated securities regulations. In the notice, SEBI has conveyed to these errant brokers that ‘it is alleged that your continuance as a market intermediary in the securities market is detrimental to the interest of this market…’

In the first show-cause notice, the allegations include several irregularities/violations such as false assurances to investors, wrong and misleading statements, arbitrage products sold with assured returns and as risk-free products, funding of clients and client code modification for those trading on NSEL.

"For grant of certificate of registration, the application has to be a fit and proper person in terms of regulation of the Stock Brokers Regulations, read with Schedule II of the SEBI (Intermediaries) Regulations, 2008. Further, the conditions stipulate that the stock broker shall at all times abide by the rules, regulation, byelaws of the stock exchange and code of conduct as specified in Schedule II of the stock exchange regulations...it is alleged that your continuance as a market intermediary in the securities market is detrimental to the interest of this market," the SCN states. "Therefore, it is alleged that you are no longer a ‘fit and proper' person for holding the certificate of registration in the securities market."

In the second show-cause notice, media reports said, SEBI sent notices to five broker firms, as it was not satisfied with the explanation offered by them on allegations of mis-selling. The SEBI officers have formed an opinion that the brokers should not be granted licences for commodity business.

The Economic Offences Wing (EOW) of Mumbai Police also found evidence of large scale irregularities on the part of these brokers in the NSEL case. A forensic audit by the EOW also revealed hawala transactions, benami trades and client code modifications by these brokers. The NSEL Investors' Action Group (NIAG) – a forum of NSEL investors requested the EOW to take strict action against these brokers who "falsely sold NSEL as an 'arbitrage product.'" Several key brokers including Motilal Oswal undertook Power of Attorney to buy/sell/receive/deliver NSEL commodities on behalf of the investors and also opened DMAT (dematerialized) accounts to handle warehouse receipts of commodities in electronic form. "These brokers have also been accused of criminal breach of trust for parting with investors' monies without securing warehouse receipts as promised," the NSEL investors said in a letter to the Commissioner of Mumbai Police.

The Hon. Bombay High Court in its judgment dated 22 August 2014 also observed that "...brokers do have their own legal team and a full knowledge of how the market operates. The legalities of the transactions were quite expected to be known to the brokers ... the brokers being quite experienced, and the investors being informed persons, it is apparent that the issue of illegality of the transactions raised by them is not out of their concern to adhere to legalities, but in order to project the applicant (Jignesh Shah) as the main offender, rather than the defaulting parties.

On 3 March 2015, the EOW, Mumbai arrested 3 top brokers in the NSEL case. Those arrested were Amit Rathi, managing director of Anand Rathi Financial Services Ltd; C P Krishnan of Geojit Comtrade Ltd; and Chintan Modi of India Infoline Ltd (IIFL). The three were charged with mis-selling NSEL products, cheating, forgery and criminal conspiracy, among other charges.

On 21 December 2018, SEBI issued supplementary notices to 300 brokers, which suggested cancellation of license if the broker found themselves unable to provide necessary explanation regarding any wrong-doing pointed out by the SFIO. SEBI will be using EOW's report of 2015 to corner brokers. The detailed investigation report was shared by EOW in 2015 with the then market regulator, FMC, specifically highlighting the role of brokers. Even, in the supplementary charge sheet filed by EOW, the top brokers have been named for the first time.

In the last week of February 2019, SEBI declared 5 major brokerages ‘not fit and proper’ as commodity derivative brokers through several orders. In the first two separate orders, the markets regulator stated that the reputation of Motilal Oswal Commodities Broker and India Infoline Commodities has been "seriously eroded", which is indispensable in declaring them "not fit and proper" for commodity trading.

Within a few days, Geofin Comtrade and Anand Rathi Commodities were also declared as ‘not fit and proper’ in the second set of orders. The same orders were issued against Phillip Commodities India. These firms have been found guilty for violating the erstwhile Forward Contract and Regulation Act (FCRA) 1972.

As a result, these firms are disallowed to act as brokers, indirectly or directly.

On 30 November 2022, the Securities and Exchange Board of India (Sebi) barred five brokerages involved in the National Spot Exchange (NSEL) fraud from registering as commodity brokers for the next six months. Anand Rathi Commodities, Motilal Oswal Commodity Broker, Phillip Commodities India, India Infoline Commodities, and Geofin Comtrade are those brokerages.

=== The role of the promoters ===
Jignesh Shah came on TV on 5 August 2013, and said that all defaulters have promised a financial settlement in front of the FMC and brokers. In case, the defaulters do not honor their commitment, the FMC would take necessary actions against them. He was arrested by EOW Mumbai Police on 7 May 2014 for his role in NSEL payment crisis but was eventually granted bail by Bombay High Court on 22 August 2014 as there was no money trail to Jignesh Shah/NSEL/FTIL and the entire money was traced by EOW to 22 defaulters.

Anjani Sinha, the sacked CEO and the MD of the company, confessed and owned up the entire responsibility of the crisis in his first affidavit. However, after his arrest, he did a complete U-turn retracting his earlier affidavit. In his custodial statement to the EOW authorities, Anjani Sinha squarely blamed Jignesh Shah and even called him ‘mastermind’ of the entire crisis. Sinha also claimed that Shah forcibly took away the passports belonging to him and his wife and made them sign confessional statements which were allegedly drafted by FTIL.

However, later on, in a statement to the Enforcement Directorate, Sinha disowned his custodial statement to the EOW and admitted to the contents of his first affidavit.

=== The role of auditor ===
Mukesh P Shah, who is a maternal uncle of Jignesh Shah, has been internal as well as external auditor of NSEL from time to time. Mumbai police while opposing his anticipatory bail confirmed that he was doing insider-trading in FTIL shares and by virtue of possession of FTIL shares alone he should have been disqualified as an auditor. Besides, Mumbai police has confirmed that most companies of 'Rawal Group' where La Fin Financial Services P. Ltd. (promoter of FTIL) had a stake were registered at NSEL at the address of Mukesh Shah and Mukesh Shah was the auditor of all these companies which traded on NSEL to the tune of ₹1352 Crores and moved out in May–June 2013 without losing a penny showing their knowledge of the case.

=== The role of the Ministry of Consumer Affairs, FMC and the UPA Government ===
In a show cause notice dated 27 April 2012, the Ministry of Consumer Affairs asked NSEL certain clarifications regarding the trades. NSEL promptly replied to this notice but for a year and half after the show cause notice, no action was taken by the Ministry. Instead, merely on the recommendation of the FMC, it ordered sudden and abrupt closure of NSEL on 12 July 2013. On 19 July 2013, the FMC revised its position and wrote to the DCA, stating that the exemption notification did not clarify whether it applied to all or only specific provisions of the FCR Act. Following the DCA's orders, NSEL suspended trading on 31 July 2013. This sudden and abrupt closure of the Exchange market led to the payment default of ₹5600 crore.

== Judgements and orders ==
On 21 October 2014, invoking Section 396 of the Companies Act, 1956, the Ministry of Corporate affairs announced a draft order for merger of NSEL, a subsidiary of FTIL. All stakeholders were given 60 days to report to MCA. FTIL challenged this merger in Bombay HC. Hearing an application filed by the government, the Bench comprising Justices SC Dharmadhikari and BP Colabawala granted the govt time till 15 February 2016.

On 12 February 2016, the MCA passed the final order of merger between FTIL and NSEL. The order was challenged by FTIL in Bombay High Court and it was upheld. On 30 April 2019, the Supreme Court set aside the Bombay High Court's decision and quashed the compulsory amalgamation of NSEL with FTIL. The Court held that the Central Government had failed to establish the requisite public interest for exercising its power of compulsory amalgamation under Section 396 of the Companies Act, 1956.

Based on MCA's own circular dated 20 April 2011, it is a known fact that for any merger to materialize, permission of 100% shareholders and 90% creditors needs to be obtained. By forcing the merger on 63,000 shareholders of FTIL without so much as giving them a chance to consent/object to the amalgamation, MCA not only went against its own circular but also against Article 14 of the Constitution. The forced merger violates the sacrosanct concept of ‘limited liability’ and is not in public interest. Third, the "corporate veil" between NSEL and FTIL cannot be lifted until the so-called "parental fraud" by FTIL is proven in a court of law.

In a significant judgement, the apex court decided against the forced merger of NSEL and FTIL that was ordered by the Ministry of Corporate Affairs, which was the first ever instance of invocation of Section 396 of the Companies Act 1956. The Union Ministry had ordered the compulsory amalgamation of National Spot Exchange Ltd (NSEL) and its parent company Financial Technologies India Ltd, currently known as 63 Moons Technology Limited. Justice Rohinton Fali Nariman and Justice Vineet Saran set aside the Bombay High Court's judgment on amalgamating the two companies. The centre had issued a final order for the merger in the light of public interest. However, the Supreme Court reckoned that the merger doesn't satisfy the criteria of ‘public interest’ and laid down a set of guidelines on what ‘public interest’ would amount to.

=== MCA's move to take over FTIL board ===
On 28 February 2015, even as the MCA had gone ahead with its idea of forced merger, it moved a petition before the Company Law Board, now known as the National Company Law Tribunal, to take over the board of FTIL and replace it with government nominated directors. FTIL challenged this, too. On 30 June 2015, the NCLT barred FTIL from selling its assets which was promptly stayed by the Madras High Court on appeal by FTIL. However, on 19 April, the Supreme Court reversed this stay and froze all assets of FTIL barring day to day expenses.

=== Financial Intelligence Unit (FIU)'s Observation ===
In 2016, FIU (under Finance Ministry) held that NSEL came under the purview of Forward Contracts (Regulation) Act (FCRA) and therefore guilty of failing in several of these obligations under the law. The black money watchdog has slapped a penalty of ₹1.66 crore for several counts of violating the provisions of Prevention of Money Laundering Act (PMLA) on NSEL. The watch dog further held that failures is deliberate and willful and hence, invite penalties. NSEL is fined Rs.1 lac for each failure and the collective fine was Rs.1.66 crore.

=== Court quashes allegations against MCX ===
A Metropolitan Court quashed allegations of a ₹900 Cr case at MCX. This is the latest update in response to an earlier FIR filed by Mumbai Police raising questions of insider trading at MCX. The court in its findings cited an audit report conducted by PWC, ruling that it was based on hearsay and dismissed the protest petition. It however accepted the C-summary report filed by the investigating officer.

=== Charge sheets by agencies in NSEL case ===
The CBI has filed a chargesheet against FTIL, Jignesh Shah, NSEL and various shell companies in NSEL case matter. The EOW of Mumbai police has also filed chargesheet against Jignesh Shah which lists out how he cooked the books of NSEL. On 27 December 2018, the EOW-Mumbai filed a supplementary charge-sheet against 63 entities including top brokers for the first time.

=== Supreme Court Declares MPID Act applicable ===
Under the MPID Act, NSEL officials and 24 defaulters were booked by the EOW of Mumbai police. The EOW had invoked the MPID Act mainly to recover the money of traders that was lost by attaching the promoter assets. In August 2019, the Bombay High Court held that NSEL is not a financial institution. Hence, under the MPID Act, all notifications for attachment of the company's assets including bank accounts and properties stand quashed.

Subsequently, petitions were filed challenging the Bombay High Court's order. The Supreme Court sought a response from 63 Moons Technologies regarding this. However, it asked the organization to maintain the status quo in regard to its assets.

Supreme Court vide Judgement dated 22 April 2022 rejected the Bombay High Court Judgement and held NSEL to be a financial establishment and upheld the attachment of assets under MPID Act.

==== Supreme Court committee ====
In May 2022, the Supreme Court appointed a committee led by retired Justice Pradeep Nandrajog to recover money from NSEL defaulters and distribute it to affected investors. On 15 May 2025, the Court upheld the committee's decisions, ruling that assets attached under the MPID Act or PMLA can be used to repay investors before secured creditors, even if insolvency proceedings are underway under the Insolvency and Bankruptcy Code.

=== Attachment of Assets ===
A detailed table listing asset seizures by the ED in connection with the NSEL case from 2013 to 2025, specifying the year, entities involved, and the value of assets seized. As of May 2025, the total value of assets attached amounts to ₹888.47 crore (equivalent to ₹917 crore or US$98 million in 2026).

Year	From Whom Seized	Value of Assets Seized
2013	Mohan India Group (Mohan India Pvt. Limited and Mohan India Delhi Pvt. Limited)	₹75 Cr.
2014	ARK Imports Pvt Limited	₹50 Cr.
2014	PD Agroprocessors Pvt. Limited	₹67 Cr.
2014	NK Proteins Limited	₹14.2 Cr.
2017	Multiple entities (not specified in detail)	₹414 Cr.
2017	Multiple entities (not specified in detail)	₹177 Cr.
2022	Pratap Sarnaik and related entities	₹15.25 Cr.
2025	Swastik Overseas Corporation and related entities	₹115.86 Cr.
2026	LOIL Group	₹19.12 Cr.
Total		₹907.59 Cr.

== Settlement ==
The first settlement occurred in August 2013, when NSEL, with support from 63 Moons Technologies, paid approximately ₹179 crore to 7,053 traders with outstanding dues of less than ₹10 lakh each.

In November 2024, brokers associated with the NSEL Investors Forum (NIF) proposed a one-time settlement of ₹1,950 crore to investors which had a consent from NSEL Investor Action Group (NIAG). This amount represents approximately 42% of the ₹4,650 crore principal owed to unpaid investors. According to the proposal, investors in the ₹10-20 lakh category had already recovered about 37%, with 6.6% from NSEL and 30.75% from the Competent Authority. If accepted, the settlement would increase their total recovery to approximately 79% of the outstanding amount. However, in early December 2024, NIAG withdrew its support because it disagreed with FTIL's approach to the MPID court, seeking access to ₹300 crore of attached assets to cover the operational expenses of the settlement, with the company offering ₹300 crore worth of securities as collateral. NSEL emphasized that the assets currently attached under the MPID Act, valued at approximately ₹2,500 crore, were more than adequate to cover the proposed settlement. At that time, NIAG's withdrawal of consent brought the settlement to a halt.

Parallelly, by mid-December 2024, the settlement proposal received 65% approval from the members of the NSEL Investors Forum and was finally approved by the FTIL board.

On 6 March 2025, 63 Moons Technologies reached a one-time settlement agreement with the claimants in the NSEL case, agreeing to pay ₹1,950 crore as a full and final resolution. A formal settlement application has been filed with the NCLT, Mumbai. To ensure transparency, an escrow agent and monitoring authority will oversee the disbursement of funds to the trading clients. This settlement will release the 63 moons group from ongoing legal proceedings, and the trading clients will assign their claims against defaulters in favour of the Company.

On 28 November 2025, the Mumbai-bench of NCLT approved the ₹1,950 crore one-time settlement (OTS) scheme between NSEL and 5,682 specified creditors (claims exceeding ₹10 lakh). The scheme received creditor approval in e-voting (92.81% by number and 91.35% by value, covering ₹2,951.85 crore in claims). Managed by Universal Trusteeship Services Ltd. under retired Justice S.C. Gupte, it provides pro-rata payouts via escrow based on dues as of 31 July 2024.

On 9 March 2026, the Supreme Court dismissed an appeal filed by creditor LJ Tanna Enterprises (holding 0.26% of the voting share) against the NCLT and NCLAT approvals of the settlement scheme. The bench comprising Justices Pamidighantam Sri Narasimha and Alok Aradhe declined to interfere with the orders.

In March 2026, the Bombay High Court approved the NCLT-approved NSEL settlement and directed government authorities to release attached assets and distribute payments to 5,682 eligible creditors based on their outstanding dues as of 31 July 2024. The Court also clarified that the settlement would not affect ongoing criminal cases being investigated by the ED or other agencies. The NCLAT dismissed all appeals against the settlement, including one filed by MMTC Ltd.

On 31 July 2026, MPID Court approved the conditional release of attached assets of 63 Moons Technologies to facilitate the OTS.

On 8 October 2026, a special PMLA court in Mumbai allowed the monetisation of assets worth approximately ₹3,464 crore (US$370 million) attached earlier. The order provides up to 1,950 crore from the proceeds to be paid to 63 Moons Technologies, as assignee of 5,682 specified creditors, subject to the conditions of the approved settlement scheme.

On 13 October 2026, the Supreme Court dismissed an appeal by MMTC Limited challenging the OTS. The decision left the settlement, previously approved by the NCLT and upheld by the NCLAT, intact.
