= Prize Bond =

Irish lottery bond

A Prize Bond is a lottery bond, a non-interest bearing security issued on behalf of the Irish Minister for Finance by the Prize Bond Company DAC. Funds raised are used to offset government borrowing and are refundable to the bond owner on demand. Interest is returned to bond owners via prizes which are distributed by random selection of bonds. Similar prize bonds are also offered in Pakistan, by the Ministry of Finance, and in the UK, under the name Premium Bonds.

== Background ==
The 1956 Finance (Miscellaneous Provisions) Act is the primary legislation under which the bonds are authorised; the similar concept of Premium Bonds were introduced in the United Kingdom at the same time. Bonds were first sold in March 1957, with the first draw held in September of that year. Originally the Bank of Ireland, as the government's banker, was the operator of the scheme. When the scheme commenced, the biannual draws were in September and March where by means of six drums the winning serial number was drawn randomly; in 1972 the serial number was increased from six to seven digits for bonds issued after that time. In 1993 regulation was made for the conduct of the draws on a weekly basis using a computer-driven random number generator to determine winning numbers.

== Organization ==
The Prize Bond Company is a joint venture between the founders An Post and FEXCO and is based in Killorglin, County Kerry. The company was created in 1989 with issued share capital between the founders of 50% each and was to operate the scheme under its contract until the end of 2019. Employees of the Prize Bond Company are seconded from the respective partner, FEXCO is responsible for administration, whilst An Post is responsible for accounting and marketing in addition to conducting the draws.

The National Treasury Management Agency is responsible for the regulation of the company, since the Agency was established in 1990.

== Finance ==
Originally bonds could be purchased as in units of five Irish pounds, with a minimum purchase of £10. Today the unit price is €6.25 (IR£4.92) and a minimum purchase of €25 is required. In September 2009 the Prize Bond fund exceeded €1bn for the first time.

The weekly draw is held on Fridays at 12:30 in the General Post Office, Dublin. Prizes range from €75 to a jackpot of €50,000 except for the last draw of each month, when the jackpot is €500,000. As of 2023, the prize fund will almost treble in size to c. €48m and the size of the fund is now almost €4.7 billion

Winnings are tax-free within Ireland.

There have been some concerns that the bonds do not represent value for money for the government. Of particular concern is the cost of administration relative to the cost of interest on borrowings.
