= American Savings Promotion Act =

American federal statute

- Long title: To provide for the use of savings promotion raffle products by financial institutions to encourage savings, and for other purposes.
- Announced in: the 113th United States Congress
- Sponsored by: Derek Kilmer (D–WA)
- Number of co-sponsors: 2

Citations
- Public law: Pub. L. 113–251 (text) (PDF)

Codification
- Acts affected: Consumer Financial Protection Act of 2010, Federal Deposit Insurance Act, Federal Credit Union Act, Revised Statutes of the United States, Home Owners' Loan Act, and others.
- U.S.C. sections affected: 18 U.S.C. § 1955, 12 U.S.C. § 5481, 12 U.S.C. § 1813, 18 U.S.C. § 1953, 12 U.S.C. § 1752, and others.
- Agencies affected: United States Congress

Legislative history
- Introduced in the House as H.R. 3374 by Derek Kilmer (D–WA) on October 29, 2013; Committee consideration by United States House Committee on Financial Services, United States House Committee on the Judiciary, United States House Judiciary Subcommittee on Crime, Terrorism, Homeland Security and Investigations, United States House Financial Services Subcommittee on Financial Institutions and Consumer Credit, United States Senate Committee on Banking, Housing, and Urban Affairs; Passed the House on September 15, 2014 (voice vote); Passed the Senate as the American Savings Promotion Act on December 10, 2014 (unanimous consent); Signed into law by President Barack Obama on December 18, 2014

The American Savings Promotion Act (H.R. 3374; Pub. L. 113–251 (text) (PDF)) is a United States federal statute that authorizes some financial institutions to conduct a contest, known as a "savings promotion raffle," in which the sole consideration required for a chance of winning designated prizes is obtained by the deposit of a specified amount of money in a savings account or program, where each ticket or entry has an equal chance of being drawn. Such accounts are also known as prize-linked savings accounts.

The bill was introduced into the United States House of Representatives during the 113th United States Congress by Rep. Derek Kilmer (D, WA-6). A companion piece of legislation was introduced into the United States Senate by Senators Jerry Moran (R-KS) and Sherrod Brown (D-OH).

The bill passed the House on a voice vote on September 15, 2014 and passed the Senate by unanimous consent on December 10, 2014. It was signed into law by President Barack Obama on December 18, 2014 and became Public Law No: 113-251.

== Background ==
In October 2013, there were eight states that had laws which allowed banks and credit unions to run contests that rewarded customers who saved money.

== Provisions of the bill ==
This summary is based largely on the summary provided by the Congressional Research Service, a public domain source.

The American Savings Promotion Act amended the Revised Statutes of the United States, the Federal Reserve Act, the Federal Deposit Insurance Act, and the Home Owners' Loan Act to authorize federally insured banks and insured credit unions to conduct a contest, known as a "savings promotion raffle," in which the sole consideration required for a chance of winning designated prizes is obtained by the deposit of a specified amount of money in a savings account or program, where each ticket or entry has an equal chance of being drawn. Subjects such a drawing contest to regulations promulgated by the appropriate prudential regulator.

The bill excludes such a "savings promotion raffle" from the prohibition against a covered financial institution's dealing in "lottery" tickets. The bill also amends the federal criminal code to exempt savings promotion raffles conducted by a covered financial institution from specified prohibitions against interstate and foreign travel or transportation in aid of racketeering enterprises.

== Procedural history ==
The American Savings Promotion Act was introduced into the United States House of Representatives on October 29, 2013 by Rep. Derek Kilmer (D, WA-6). Representatives Tom Cotton (R-AR) and Niki Tsongas (D-MA) were initial co-sponsors of the bill. The bill was referred to the United States House Committee on Financial Services, the United States House Committee on the Judiciary, the United States House Judiciary Subcommittee on Crime, Terrorism, Homeland Security and Investigations, and the United States House Financial Services Subcommittee on Financial Institutions and Consumer Credit. On September 15, 2014, the House agreed on a motion to suspend the rules and to pass the bill by voice vote.

The American Savings Promotion Act was received in the United States Senate on September 16, 2014 and referred it to the United States Senate Committee on Banking, Housing, and Urban Affairs. On December 10, 2014, the Banking, Housing, and Urban Affairs Committee discharged the bill by unanimous consent and on that same day, the Senate passed the bill without amendment by unanimous consent.

The American Savings Promotion Act was presented to President Barack Obama on December 12, 2014 and signed into law by the president on December 18, 2014, which is when it became Pub. L. 113–251 (text) (PDF).

== Debate and discussion ==
Senator Jerry Moran (R-KS) praised the passage of the bill, describing it as "common sense." Moran argued that the bill "has broad bipartisan support and represents smart and sensible policy that ought not be derailed by campaign politics."

== See also ==
- List of bills in the 113th United States Congress
