= Maya Bakhai =

American entrepreneur and venture capitalist

- Citizenship: American
- Education: New York University Stern School of Business
- Occupations: Entrepreneur, venture capitalist
- Years active: 2017–present
- Known for: founding Spice Capital
- Website: https://www.mayabakhai.com

Maya Bakhai is an American entrepreneur and venture capitalist. She is the founder and general partner of Spice Capital, an early-stage investment firm focused on consumer technology, cryptocurrency, and community-driven startups.

Bakhai was recognized on Forbes' 2023 30 Under 30 list in the Venture Capital category.

== Early life and education ==
Bakhai attended the NYU Stern School of Business, where she earned a Bachelor of Science degree in finance, computing, and data science. During her studies, she served as co-president of the Business Analytics Club and the Cheese Club and participated in the Stern Social Impact Council.

== Career ==
=== Early career ===
In 2017, Bakhai became chief marketing officer of Ashcat Productions and concurrently served as an executive producer on web series that were screened at Sydney Webfest and NYC Webfest. From 2018 to 2021, Bakhai held an investment role at Thirty Five Ventures, the firm founded by Kevin Durant and Rich Kleiman. While at the firm, she participated in investments across multiple stages, including companies such as Hugging Face, Whoop, Mercury, OpenSea, Dapper Labs, Rubrik, Sleeper, and Underdog Fantasy.

=== Spice Capital (2021–present) ===
In 2021, Bakhai founded Spice Capital, a venture Capital firm investing in early stage startups across AI, Blockchain, Consumer and Deep Tech. The fund has been backed by technology investors including Marc Andreessen, Chris Dixon, and Alexis Ohanian.

Spice Capital has invested in more than fifty companies across consumer technology, media, and crypto-related sectors. Bakhai has stated that the firm's name references historic international commerce, spice trade. The fund's initial structure allowed for relatively low minimum investment amounts, which she has described as an effort to broaden participation among individuals traditionally underrepresented in venture capital.
