= IEX (disambiguation) =

IEX is used as an abbreviation or name for several unrelated exchanges:

- Investors Exchange, more commonly IEX, is an alternate stock exchange founded by Brad Katsuyama
- Irish Enterprise Exchange, see List of European stock exchanges
- Indian Energy Exchange, an Indian power trading exchange

IEX may also refer to:

- Internet Explorer 10, a web browser from Microsoft
- Ion exchange
- iex, an alias for the Invoke-Expression command in PowerShell
