= Alphadyne Asset Management =

New York Hedge Fund

Alphadyne Asset Management LP
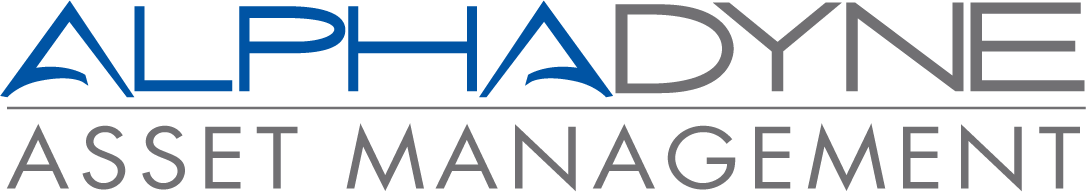
- Company type: Private
- Industry: Investment management
- Founded: 2005; 21 years ago
- Founders: Philippe Khuong-Huu; Bart Broadman
- Headquarters: 17 State Street, New York City, U.S.
- Key people: Joseph Regan (CEO); Philippe Khuong-Huu (CIO)
- Products: Hedge funds Alternative investments
- AUM: US$9.1 billion (April 2023)
- Number of employees: 87 (2023)
- Website: adyne.com

Alphadyne Asset Management (Alphadyne) is an American hedge fund management firm headquartered in New York City. The firm's focuses on global macro and fixed-income relative-value investing strategies.

Outside the U.S., Alphadyne has offices in London, Copenhagen, Tokyo, Hong Kong and Singapore.

== Background ==
Alphadyne was co-founded in 2005 by Philippe Khuong-Huu and Bart Broadman. Khuong-Huu was previously the head of global interest rate products group at Goldman Sachs while Broadman was vice chairman of Asia–Pacific at JPMorgan Chase. They were joined by four partners from their former firms.

In October 2009, Risk magazine named Alphadyne hedge fund manager of the year for its ability to manage risk and returns during the 2008 financial crisis.

In 2017, Alphadyne spun-off its Asian team into a new firm Astignes Capital that would be based in Singapore and focus on economic trends in Asia. Co-founder Broadman would move to the new firm to become its CIO.

In August 2021, it was reported that the firm's flagship fund, Alphadyne International Master Fund lost about 10% that year due to short squeeze in the global bond market and its bad bets on rising interest rates. This came as a surprise as the fund never had an annual loss since its inception in 2006. Its losses extended to 22% in November that year.

In 2022, the Alphadyne Global Rates fund returned 17% for the year. The firm had increased its Asian presence with one-third of its investment team being based in Asia as part of its investment strategy.

In November 2023, ransomware group LockBit claimed responsibility for hacking Alphadyne stating it had to make an unspecified payment by the deadline or it will publish the stolen data online.

During the COVID-19 pandemic, the firm has created the Alphadyne Foundation that award grants to arts groups.
