= PTC India =

Power trading company

PTC India Limited
- Formerly: Power Trading Corporation of India Limited
- Company type: Public
- Traded as: BSE: 532524; NSE: PTC
- ISIN: INE877F01012
- Industry: Energy
- Founded: 16 April 1999; 27 years ago
- Founder: Government of India
- Headquarters: NBCC Tower, 15 Bhikaji Cama Place, New Delhi, India
- Areas served: India, Nepal, Bhutan, and Bangladesh
- Key people: Dr. Manoj Kumar Jhawar(Chairman & MD)
- Revenue: ▼₹17,680 crore (US$1.8 billion) (FY2022)
- Operating income: ▼₹1,540.22 crore (US$160 million) (FY2022)
- Net income: ▼₹426.36 crore (US$44 million) (FY2022)
- Owners: Power Grid (4.05%); Power Finance (4.05%); NTPC (4.05%); NHPC (4.05%)
- Subsidiaries: PTC India Financial Services Limited (65%); PTC Energy Ltd.
- Website: www.ptcindia.com

PTC India Limited, formerly Power Trading Corporation of India Limited, is an Indian company that provides power trading solutions, cross border power trading, and consultancy services. Headquartered in New Delhi, the company also has operations in Nepal, Bhutan, and Bangladesh. PTC India's subsidiaries PTC India Financial Services Limited and PTC Energy Limited provide financial assistance for companies in the power sector and run renewable energy projects respectively. 16% of the company is publicly owned by the Indian government.

As of January 2019, PTC Energy managed a renewable energy portfolio of around 290 megawatts of wind assets across Madhya Pradesh, Karnataka and Andhra Pradesh.

In 2020, PTC received approval to create India's third power exchange after Indian Energy Exchange (IEX) and Power Exchange India (PXIL).
