= Motilal Oswal =

Indian businessman

- Born: Padru, Rajasthan, India
- Education: Institute of Chartered Accountants of India
- Occupations: Chairman & Managing Director of Motilal Oswal Group
- Website: www.motilaloswal.com

Motilal Oswal is an Indian businessman. He is the founder, chairman and managing director of Motilal Oswal Financial Services Ltd, which he co-founded with Raamdeo Agrawal in 1987.

== Early life ==
Oswal was born to a Jain family in the small village of Padru in Barmer, Rajasthan, near the international border. His father was a grain trader and a well to do businessman. However, instead of joining the family trade, Oswal decided to pursue formal education. He studied at the SPU Jain College in Falna before moving to Mumbai to study CA. In 1987, during his stay at a Mumbai hostel, the Rajasthan Vidyarthi grih Oswal met Raamdeo Agarwal, his friend with whom he later founded Motilal Oswal Financial Services.

== Career ==
After working with a private audit firm for a while, Oswal and Agarwal started their own accounting firm. They later decided to join the BSE as sub-brokers. During those times, the exchange was dominated by Gujarati traders. However, the duo met a broker on the floor who got them a sub-broker position at the BSE. They were issued a badge with the name Motilal Oswal, which subsequently became the name of the company they founded in 1989. Over time, both friends demarcated their responsibilities in their company. While Agarwal looked into finance with his 40-member research team, Oswal took charge of customer support, HR, operations and expansion with franchisee network.

== Awards ==
For his work and contribution to the capital markets, Oswal has received several awards, including:

- Motilal Oswal, Chairman & MD is awarded as Outstanding Institution Builder of the Year in The AIMA Managing India Awards
- Special Contribution Award to Indian Capital Markets’ Award by Zee Business
- The Hall of Fame for Excellence in Franchising by Franchising World Magazine
- Champion of Arthshastra by the Rotary Club
- Samaj Ratna Award at the hands of Her Excellency President Smt. Pratibhatai Patil in Rashtrapati Bhavan
- Rajasthan Ratna Lifetime Achievement Award from Manav Seva Trust

== Recognition ==
Oswal has received the Rashtriya Samman Patra award from the Government of India for being amongst the highest income taxpayers in the country for a period of 5 years from FY95–FY99.

Oswal is associated with various social organisations. He is the President of the Jain International Trade Organisation (JITO) and a Trustee of "Agarwal-Oswal Chhatravas" of the Rajasthan Vidyarthi Griha, among others.

He has authored two books of quotations on The Essence of Business & Management and The Essence of Life.
