= Synapse Financial Technologies =

American banking as a service company

- Type: Private company
- Industry: Financial services
- Founded: April 14, 2014
- Founders: Sankaet Pathak; Bryan Keltner
- Defunct: April 2024; 2 years ago
- Fate: Bankrupt
- Headquarters: San Francisco, United States
- Area served: United States
- Key people: Sankaet Pathak (CEO)
- Products: banking as a service to other financial technology companies
- Number of employees: 157 (2024)
- Website: synapsefi.com Archived May 9, 2024, at the Wayback Machine

Synapse Financial Technologies, Inc. was an American banking as a service company based in San Francisco. It was founded by Sankaet Pathak and Bryan Keltner in 2014 and filed for bankruptcy in April 2024.

== History ==
Synapse was co-founded by Sankaet Pathak and Bryan Keltner in 2014 as a banking as a service platform. The company claimed to keep customer deposits in FDIC insured bank accounts, and argued that this provided a comparable level of depositor protection to conventional bank accounts. However, since Synapse was a non-bank company, it did not provide FDIC protection for depositors against its own bankruptcy.

The company was backed by Andreessen Horowitz and raised $51 million from investors. The company had 100 direct business relationships with financial technology companies including Dave and Honey, indirectly serving 10 million retail customers through those relationships. It was one of the 100 fastest growing financial services companies in the United States in 2022. In 2023, as "discrepancies in Synapse’s ledgers were piling up," the company's board discussed removing Sankaet Pathak from his role as CEO, but investors from Andreessen Horowitz argued against this.

The company was valued as a unicorn in 2024.

The company filed for Chapter 11 bankruptcy protection in April 2024. Following the bankruptcy declaration, "tens of thousands of U.S. businesses and consumers" lost access to Synapse's services, leaving questions as to the location of funds. In May 2024, former FDIC Chair Jelena McWilliams, appointed as bankruptcy trustee, said there was a shortfall between Synapse’s records and those of the banks, estimated at $65 million to $96 million.

The CEO of Yotta Savings, a fintech company which relied on Synapse to manage customer deposits, released financial data in November 2024 showing that 13,725 former customers lost deposited money due to the Synapse bankruptcy. They were refunded $11.8 million against $64.9 million in deposits.

=== Legal proceedings ===
As of November 2024, a lawsuit was in progress against four of Synapse's banking partners — Evolve Bank & Trust, AMG National Trust Bank, American Bank North America, and Lineage Bank — seeking class action status in regard to losses by those affected by Synapse's bankruptcy.

In August, 2025 the Consumer Financial Protection Bureau sued Synapse. The CFPB alleged that Synapse did not maintain accurate records of consumers' funds. It cited the shortfall between the Synapse's records and the records of the banks which held the funds. The suit allowed the CFPB to use its Civil Penalty Fund to redress harmed consumers.
