= Prize-linked savings account =

Type of savings account

A prize-linked savings account (PLSA) or lottery-linked deposit account is a savings account in which some of the interest payment on bank deposits or marketing dollars are distributed as prizes based on chance. They are attractive to consumers as they function both as a sweepstakes or game of chance (as there is a small chance of a large prize) and as savings vehicle (the deposit is never lost, unlike normal lotteries). PLSAs are similar to lottery bonds, except they are offered by banks, credit unions, prepaid card companies, and financial technology companies, and they can be held for a period of time determined by the consumer. Sometimes the returns are in-kind prizes rather than cash.

PLSAs have attracted customers who were previously familiar with only raffles or lotteries, but were interested in receiving guaranteed saving security as well as an attractive incentive in the form of lotteries.

== United States ==
The first large-scale PLSA program in the United States was created in 2009 in Michigan, called "Save to Win". It was introduced as a full scale demonstration by Commonwealth (formerly D2D Fund Inc.), Filene Research Institute, and the Michigan Credit Union League following research by Peter Tufano from Harvard Business School, who co-founded Commonwealth in 2001. During this research, 56% of the participants were non-savers before the program.

By 2013, eight states had authorized financial institutions to offer PLSAs. The federal American Savings Promotion Act was signed into law in 2014. It removed some obstacles in federal law faced by state-authorized PLSAs. The act used the term "savings promotion raffle" to describe these accounts.

As of 2018, 33 states had passed legislation or taken legal action to ensure banks and credit unions (or in some states, only credit unions) can offer savings promotion raffles.

Prize-linked savings accounts have the potential to help combat low rates of savings among Americans. They offer more incentive than a traditional savings account as an individual may be discouraged earning a low rate of return in a standard savings account. US families that play the lottery all tend to spend roughly the same amount, regardless of economic status. Because of this, those falling in the low end of the economic distribution have the potential to see true growth of personal savings through the use of a PLSA.

=== Credit unions ===
Examples of prize-linked savings include:

USA

- Big Prize Savings (California)
- Lucky Lagniappe (Louisiana)
- Save to Win (28 US states)
- Saver's Sweepstakes (Wisconsin)
- WINcentive Savings (Minnesota)

Europe

- Premium Bond Savings (United Kingdom)
- Prize Linked Bonds (Ireland)

=== Banks ===
Examples of prize-linked savings in American banks include:

- Jackpot Savings from Blue Ridge Bank in Virginia
- Lucky Piggy Savings from BankFive in Massachusetts

=== Direct-to-consumer ===
Examples of prize-linked savings in direct-to-consumer financial technology applications include:

- PrizePool
- Flourish Savings

- Yotta Savings, which collapsed leaving savers with no federal savings guarantee
- Long Game

=== Cryptocurrency ===
Examples of prize-linked savings in cryptocurrency DeFi applications and Games include:

- Qache
- PoolTogether

== Around the world ==
Prize-linked savings accounts have also been offered in Argentina, Brazil, Canada, Colombia, Germany, Indonesia, Iran, Japan, Mexico, Oman, Pakistan, Spain, South Africa, Sri Lanka, Turkey, United Arab Emirates, and Venezuela.

In South Africa, the First National Bank created a program called the Million a Month Account (MAMA), aimed at increasing savings accounts among unbanked people. It was later closed after the state-run lottery sued them for infringing upon their monopoly.

== Economics of prize-linked savings ==
The success of the prize-linked savings account can be attributed to several concepts studied in the field of behavioral economics. One such concept is the availability heuristic. Essentially, people are likely to associate and have faith in things which readily come to mind, such as winning a lottery, as lottery winners are prevalent in media. Another behavioral economic concept which contributes to the success of prize-linked savings is the sunk cost fallacy. This is displayed in prize-linked savings as people who use these accounts will often save an increasing amount of money to up their odds in winning the prize, regardless of how small the odds are. The misunderstanding of small probabilities also can be attributed to the success of prize-linked savings as it is nearly impossible for any individual to fathom odds in the millions as our day-to-day lives deal with quantities going no higher than a few thousand. The demand for prize-linked savings accounts is seen to be highest amongst those with relatively low savings. This group of individuals is also more prone to gambling so Prize-Linked savings accounts have more potential to induce savings in this population. Skewness also plays into the appeal of PLSAs as it is essentially the idea that there is some chance to win a big prize with possible odds that could be realized (although they are small).

== Institutional appeal of prize-linked savings ==
Prize-linked savings account have several appeals to financial institutions which other savings and investment vehicles do not offer. PLSAs are not very complex in their investment strategy and typically go for risk-averse vehicles, so they often require less effort and maintenance on behalf of the institution. They offer the consumer transparency and legitimacy as the institution can consistently offer the same prize through the adjustment of odds in relation to the amount of interest being made on the collective fund. Finally, PLSAs can maximize the liquidity of their consumers by denying those who frequently make withdrawals eligibility to win prizes.

== See also ==
- Premium Bond
