= Yotta Technologies =

American fintech company

- Type: Private
- Industry: Financial technology
- Founded: October 2019
- Founders: Adam Moelis, Ben Doyle
- Headquarters: New York City, US
- Key people: Adam Moelis (CEO)
- Services: Prize-linked savings account, fintech services
- Website: www.withyotta.com

Yotta Technologies, previously known as Yotta Savings, is an American financial technology (fintech) company that offers sweepstakes games, and that formerly offered a prize-linked savings account. On May 11, 2024, due to the failure of Synapse, a fintech company on which Yotta depended, Yotta's customers lost access to the money held in their accounts. Because Yotta is not a bank, Yotta's customers were not entitled to deposit insurance. Some customers received some funds in a November 2024 settlement, but as of May 2026, others have received nothing.

== Savings account provider ==
Yotta was founded by Adam Moelis, the son of billionaire investment banker Ken Moelis, and Ben Doyle. The company was founded in October 2019, and its platform launched in July 2020. Early funders of Yotta include hedge fund manager Cliff Asness and Ken Moelis. In January 2021, Yotta announced that it had raised $13.2M in Series A funding, led by Base10 Partners, with additional funding from Y Combinator, Core Innovation Capital, and Slow Ventures.

Yotta originally offered depositors an interest rate of 0.2%, establishing a prize pool with the remaining deposit interest, with a top prize of $10 million. The top prize was later revised to $1 million, which was never won. New York Times columnist, Peter Coy, described Yotta as "a smart way to turn gambling into a virtue". Customers receive sweepstakes tickets based on the size of their deposit. One Yotta user won $500,000 in a September 2022 sweepstakes drawing.

The company launched an influencer marketing campaign in 2022. Popular influencers helped drive growth in Yotta's customer base.

=== Funds availability issues ===
Yotta relied on Synapse, a fintech company based in San Francisco, to make funds available for deposit and withdrawal to partner banks, such as Arkansas-based Evolve Bank & Trust. Following a dispute between Synapse and Evolve, Synapse filed for Chapter 11 bankruptcy protection in 2024, affecting customers of Yotta and at least 24 other startups. Adam Moelis told CNBC in June 2024 that 85,000 Yotta customers, with a combined $112 million in deposits, could not access their funds. Although the partner banks had deposit insurance through the Federal Deposit Insurance Corporation (FDIC), the FDIC has not intervened, because no bank has failed.

In a letter filed with a bankruptcy court on June 20, 2024, Evolve wrote that on April 11, eight banks held a total of $109 million in deposits for Yotta customers and that about a month later, one bank held $1.4 million of Yotta funds. Neither customers nor Evolve received funds in the intervening time. Moelis had said that, as of May 17, Evolve held $112 million of Yotta's customers' funds; Evolve disputes this. In September 2024, Yotta sued Evolve in the United States District Court for the Northern District of California, accusing the bank of conspiring with Synapse to take Yotta's customer funds.

In November 2024, 13,725 Yotta depositors said that they were being offered $11.8 million of their $64.9 million in deposits. Several depositors reported being paid less than 1% of the funds they had put into Yotta. A volunteer group, Fight For Our Funds, has been formed to advocate for additional reimbursements.

The California Department of Financial Protection and Innovation (DFPI) settled with Yotta in May 2026, having determined that Yotta falsely claimed that its accounts were covered by FDIC insurance, when they were not. The DFPI announced that Yotta must pay a $1 million penalty "for engaging in deceptive acts or practices." Under a consent order, the DFPI mandated that Yotta inform its California depositors about how to obtain relief from the Consumer Financial Protection Bureau's Civil Penalty Fund.

== Sweepstakes ==
In June 2024, Coffeezilla, a YouTube producer focused on financial scams, observed that Yotta had pivoted to offering casino-style games, including blackjack, dice, and roulette games, funded by microtransactions instead of savings account deposits. The company changed its Twitter handle from @yottasavings to @winwithyotta, stopped paying rewards on its savings accounts, and shifted to promoting its sweepstakes games exclusively.
