= Singapore Mercantile Exchange =

Singapore Mercantile Exchange Pte. Ltd. (SMX)
- Type: Commodities exchange
- Location: Temasek Avenue, Singapore
- Owner: Financial Technologies Group
- Key people: Ang Swee Tian (Chairman), Jignesh Shah (Vice Chairman), V. Hariharan (CEO)
- Currency: SGD
- Commodities: Precious metals, base metals, agriculture commodities, energy, currencies and commodity indices
- Website: www.smx.com.sg

The Singapore Mercantile Exchange (SMX) is a pan-Asian multi-product commodity and currency derivatives exchange situated in Singapore. The exchange deals with international trading in a diversified basket of commodities and derivatives including futures and options contracts on precious metals, base metals, agriculture commodities, energy, currencies and commodity indices.

In August 2010, the Singapore Mercantile Exchange was granted 'Approved Exchange' (AE) status by the Monetary Authority of Singapore to operate as a regulated and licensed exchange.
