= Evolve Bank & Trust =

Bank based in Arkansas, USA

- Type: Subsidiary
- Industry: Financial services
- Predecessor: First State Bank
- Founded: June 5, 1925; 101 years ago
- Headquarters: West Memphis, Arkansas, United States
- Number of locations: 26
- Key people: W. Scott Stafford (CEO)
- Products: Evolve Open Banking
- Parent: Evolve Bancorp Inc.
- Website: www.getevolved.com

Evolve Bank & Trust, formerly First State Bank, is an American bank headquartered in West Memphis, Arkansas.

In 2024, Evolve Bank faced scrutiny due to freezing funds of certain fintech customers, including Yotta and Juno, which restricted access to over $100 million held in customer accounts. This incident attracted public attention as many impacted customers eventually received only minimal fund access, leading to widespread frustration and media coverage.

== History ==
=== Early years ===
Founded in Parkin in 1925 as First State Bank, the bank provided loans to local farmers in Cross County, Arkansas. In 1934, it became a member of the Federal Deposit Insurance Corporation.

=== 2005-2023 ===
In 2005, First State Bank was renamed to Evolve Bank & Trust after a group led by Chairman Scot Lenoir acquired it. The bank then relocated its banking charter to West Memphis.

In 2017, Evolve established its Open Banking division to provide Banking-as-a-Service. Evolve serves as the partner bank for fintech companies like Branch, Marqeta, Mercury, and Stripe. Evolve Open Banking also provides card services offerings, allowing companies to white-label Mastercard, Visa, and American Express cards.

=== 2024 - Present ===
Following Evolve's partner Synapse Financial Technologies's bankruptcy in April 2024, Evolve froze customer withdrawals from these partner apps, citing accounting discrepancies that made it unclear which funds belonged to which users. The freeze lasted five months, during which tens of thousands of customers were locked out of their accounts. Even after reconciliation, tens of millions of dollars remained missing.

In June 2024, the Federal Reserve Board issued an enforcement action against the bank for deficiencies in their anti–money laundering, risk management, and consumer compliance programs.

Additionally in June 2024, Evolve announced it was the victim of a data breach by the cybercrime group LockBit. Some of its corporate fintech clients, including Affirm, Mercury and Wise also announced their customers were affected by the breach.

In September 2024, Synapse Financial Technologies accused Evolve of misappropriating customer funds. Synapse, which had filed for bankruptcy that spring, had served as a banking as a service platform linking Evolve to fintech apps like Yotta Technologies and Juno.

Evolve's Chief Marketing & Communications Officer resigned in October 2024, citing his "integrity and well-being" as a cause.

On August 13, 2025, the board of directors unanimously elected Robert "Bob" Hartheimer as CEO. “Appointing Bob Hartheimer as CEO marks a turning point for Evolve,” said Board Chairman Steve Valentine. “Bob was selected for his unmatched corporate experience in strategically navigating challenges at financial institutions and enabling banks to move past their regulatory challenges. He has the full backing of the Board to take decisive action, restore thoughtful innovation, and lead Evolve into a future defined by transparency and sustainable growth. This is a structural change, demonstrating our continued commitment to doing the hard work to earn back the trust of our customers, employees, regulators, and investors.”

Hartheimer, 68, was arrested by the FBI on October 23, 2025, at the company's headquarters in East Memphis and charged with child sex crimes. He was fired the next day.
