= Premium Bonds =

UK government NS&I lottery bond scheme

Premium Bonds is a lottery bond scheme organised by the United Kingdom government since 1956. At present it is managed by the government's National Savings and Investments agency.

The principle behind Premium Bonds is that rather than the stake being gambled, as in a usual lottery, it is the interest on the bonds that is distributed by a lottery. The bonds are entered in a monthly prize draw and the government promises to buy them back, on request, for their original price.

The government pays interest into the bond fund (currently 4.35% per annum from which a monthly lottery distributes tax-free prizes to bondholders whose numbers are selected randomly. The machine that generates the numbers is called ERNIE, an acronym for "Electronic Random Number Indicator Equipment". Prizes range from £25 to £1,000,000 and (since September 2026) the odds of a £1 bond winning a prize in a given month are 21,000 to 1.

Investors can buy bonds at any time but they must be held for a whole calendar month before they qualify for a prize. As an example, a bond purchased mid-May must then be held throughout June before being eligible for the draw in July (and onwards). Bonds purchased by reinvestment of prizes are immediately eligible for the following month's draw.

Numbers are entered in the draw each month, with an equal chance of winning, until the bond is cashed. As of 2015, each person may own bonds up to £50,000. Since 1 February 2019, the minimum purchase amount for Premium Bonds has been £25. As of September 2026 there are over 137.12 billion eligible Premium Bonds, each having a value of £1.

When introduced to the wider public in 1957, the only other similar game available in the UK was the football pools, with the National Lottery not coming into existence until 1994. Although many avenues of lotteries and other forms of gambling are now available to British adults, Premium Bonds are held by more than 24 million people, equivalent to more than 1 in 3 of the UK population.

== History ==
The term "premium bond" has been used in the English language since at least the late 18th century, to mean a bond that earns no interest but is eligible for entry into a lottery.

The modern iteration of Premium Bonds were introduced by Harold Macmillan, as Chancellor of the Exchequer, in his Budget of 17 April 1956, to control inflation and encourage people to save. On 1 November 1956, in front of the Royal Exchange in the City of London, the Lord Mayor of London, Alderman Sir Cuthbert Ackroyd, bought the first bond from the Postmaster General, Dr Charles Hill, for £1. Councillor William Crook, the mayor of Lytham St Anne's, bought the second. The Premium Bonds office was in St Annes-on-Sea, Lancashire, until it moved to Blackpool in 1978. On 2 June 1957, Ernest Marples (Postmaster General) started the first Premium Bond draw.

Maximum Holding
Date	Amount
01-11-1956	£500
01-08-1960	£800
21-04-1964	£1000
14-04-1967	£1250
01-04-1971	£2000
11-09-1978	£3000
21-04-1980	£10,000
03-04-1993	£20,000
12-05-2003	£30,000
01-06-2014	£40,000
01-06-2015	£50,000

== Winning ==
Winners of the jackpot are told on the first working day of the month, although the actual date of the draw varies. The online prize finder is updated by the third or fourth working day of the month. Winners of the top £1m prize are told in person of their win by "Agent Million", an NS&I employee, usually on the day before the first working day of the month. However, in-person visits were suspended, starting in May 2020, during the COVID-19 pandemic in the United Kingdom.

Bond holders can check whether they have won any prizes on the National Savings & Investment Premium Bond Prize Checker website, or the smartphone app, which provides lists of winning bond numbers for the past six months. Older winning numbers (more than 18 months old) can also be checked in the London Gazette Premium Bonds Unclaimed Prizes Supplement.

=== Odds of winning ===
In December 2008, NS&I reduced the interest rate (and therefore the odds of winning) due to the drop in the Bank of England base rate during the Great Recession, leading to criticism from members of Parliament, financial experts and holders of bonds; many claimed Premium Bonds were now "worthless", and somebody with £30,000 invested and "average luck" would win only 10 prizes a year compared to 15 the previous year. Investors with smaller, although significant, amounts would possibly win nothing.

From 1 January 2009 the odds of winning a prize for each £1 of bond were 36,000 to 1. In October 2009, the odds returned to 24,000 to 1 with the prize fund interest rate increase. The odds reached 26,000 to 1 by October 2013 and then reverted to 24,500 to 1 in November 2017.

As of September 2026, the odds of winning are 1/21,000, resulting in the expected number of prizes for the maximum £50,000 worth of bonds being 28 per year.

=== Prize fund distribution ===
The prize fund is equal to one month's interest on all bonds eligible for the draw. The annual interest is set by NS&I and was 1.40% as of December 2017, reducing to 1.00% as of December 2020. This was increased to 2.2%, as of October 2022 then increased again to 3% as of January 2023 and is now at 4.35% from September 2026. The following table lists the distribution of prizes on offer in the September 2026 draw.

Prize band	Prize value	Estimated number of prizes each month	Odds of winning exactly this amount with a £1 bond	Odds of winning at least this amount with a £1 bond
Higher value 10% of the prize fund	£1,000,000	2	1 in 68.56 billion	1 in 68.56 billion
Higher value 10% of the prize fund	£100,000	95	1 in 1.44 billion	1 in 1.41 billion
Higher value 10% of the prize fund	£50,000	192	1 in 714,204,288	1 in 474,488,662
Higher value 10% of the prize fund	£25,000	381	1 in 359,913,972	1 in 204,667,497
Higher value 10% of the prize fund	£10,000	954	1 in 143,739,228	1 in 84,437,945
Higher value 10% of the prize fund	£5,000	1,909	1 in 71,831,967	1 in 38,813,253
Medium value 10% of the prize fund	£1,000	19,882	1 in 6,897,054	1 in 5,856,384
Medium value 10% of the prize fund	£500	59,646	1 in 2,299,018	1 in 1,650,922
Low value 80% of the prize fund	£100	2,365,010	1 in 57,982	1 in 56,014
Low value 80% of the prize fund	£50	2,365,010	1 in 57,983	1 in 28,491
Low value 80% of the prize fund	£25	1,716,787	1 in 79,877	1 in 21,000
Total value (September 2026)	£497,086,175	6,529,868		

== Economic analysis ==
While the mean return is 4.35% as of September 2026, the median return is lower. For an investor with the maximum £50,000 invested, the median return is 3.8% (£1,900). For investors with lower amounts invested, the median return is lower. The typical investor with £1,000 or less invested will receive nothing in a year.

Premium Bonds are tax free, so are more attractive to higher rate taxpayers.

== ERNIE ==
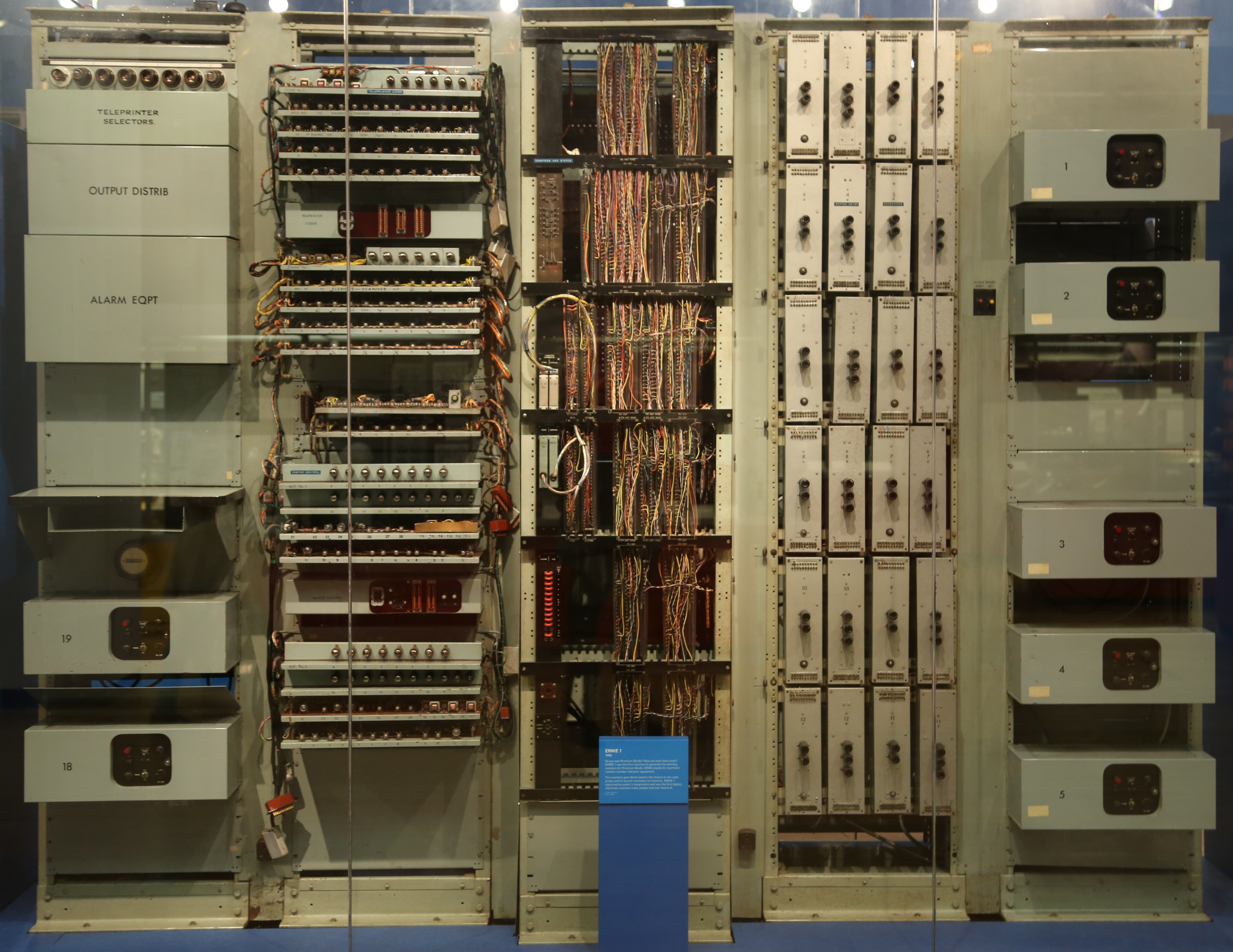
ERNIE 1 on display at the Science Museum, London, 2012

ERNIE – an acronym for "Electronic Random Number Indicator Equipment" (and short for the male name Ernest, as in Ernest Marples) – is the name for a series of hardware random number generators developed for this application. There have been five models of ERNIE to date. All of them have generated true random numbers derived from random statistical fluctuations in a variety of physical processes.

The first ERNIE was built at the Post Office Research Station by a team led by Sidney Broadhurst. The designers were Tommy Flowers and Harry Fensom and it derives from Colossus, one of the world's first digital computers. It was introduced in 1957, with the first draw on 1 June, and generated bond numbers from the signal noise created by neon gas discharge tubes. ERNIE 1 is in the collections of the Science Museum in London and was on display between 2008 and 2015.

ERNIE 2 replaced the first ERNIE in 1972.

ERNIE 3 in 1988 was the size of a personal computer; at the end of its life it took five and a half hours to complete its monthly draw.

In August 2004, ERNIE 4 was brought into service in anticipation of an increase in prizes each month from September 2004. Developed by LogicaCMG, it was 500 times faster than the original and generated a million numbers an hour; these were checked against a list of valid bonds. By comparison, the original ERNIE generated 2,000 numbers an hour and was the size of a van.

ERNIE 4 used thermal noise in transistors as its source of randomness to generate true random numbers. ERNIE's output was independently tested each month by the Government Actuary's Department, the draw being valid only if it was certified to be statistically consistent with randomness. At the end of its life it was moved to Bletchley Park's National Museum of Computing.

ERNIE 5, the latest model, was brought into service in March 2019, and is a quantum random number generator built by ID Quantique. It uses quantum technology to produce random numbers through light, replacing the former 'thermal noise' method. Running at speeds 21,000 times faster than the first ERNIE, it can produce 3 million winners in just 12 minutes each month.

=== In popular culture ===
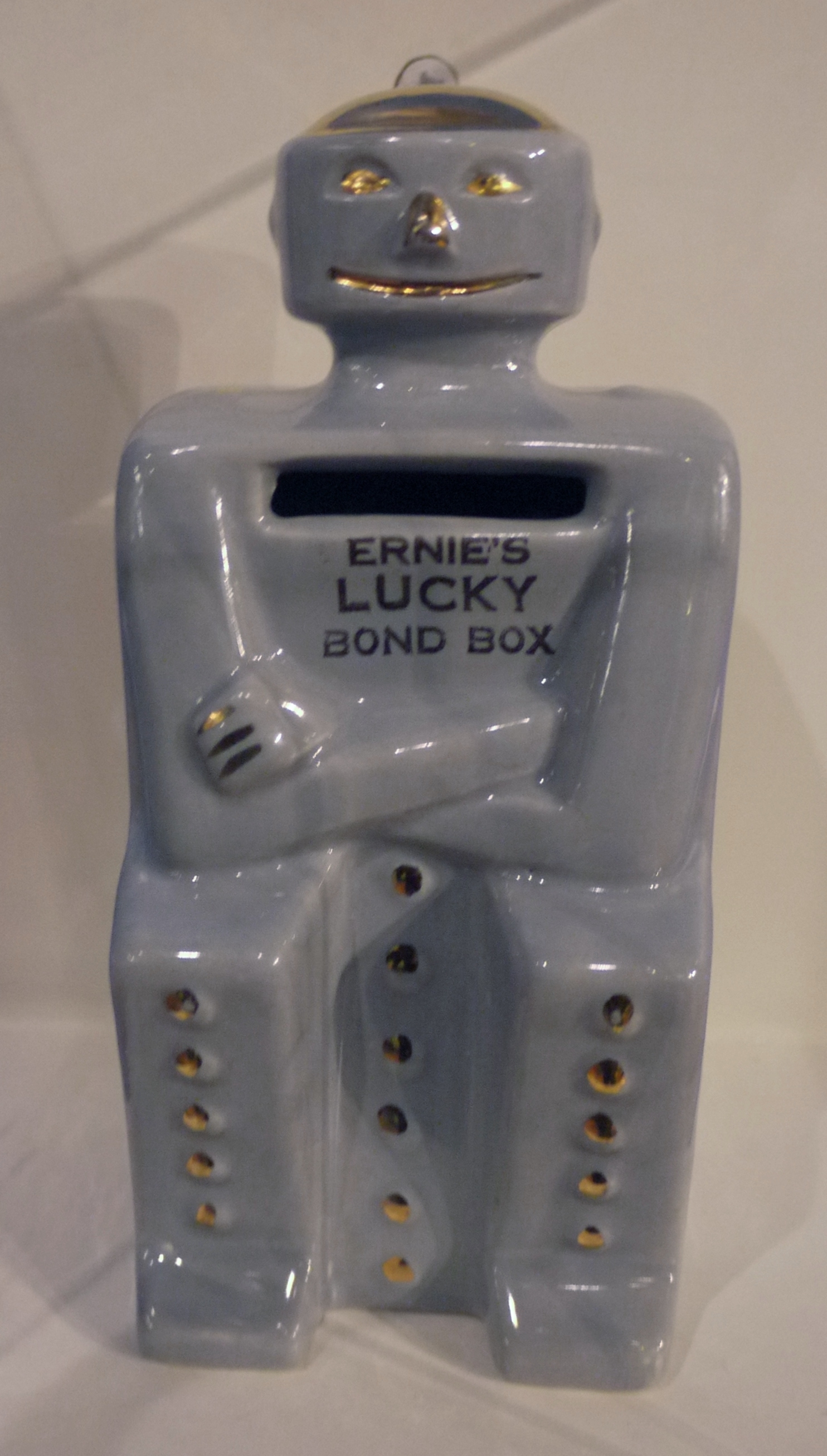
An ERNIE money box

ERNIE, anthropomorphised in early advertising, receives Valentine cards, Christmas cards and letters from the public. It is the subject of the song "E.R.N.I.E." by Madness, from the 1980 album Absolutely. It is also referenced by Jethro Tull in their album Thick as a Brick.

== In other countries ==
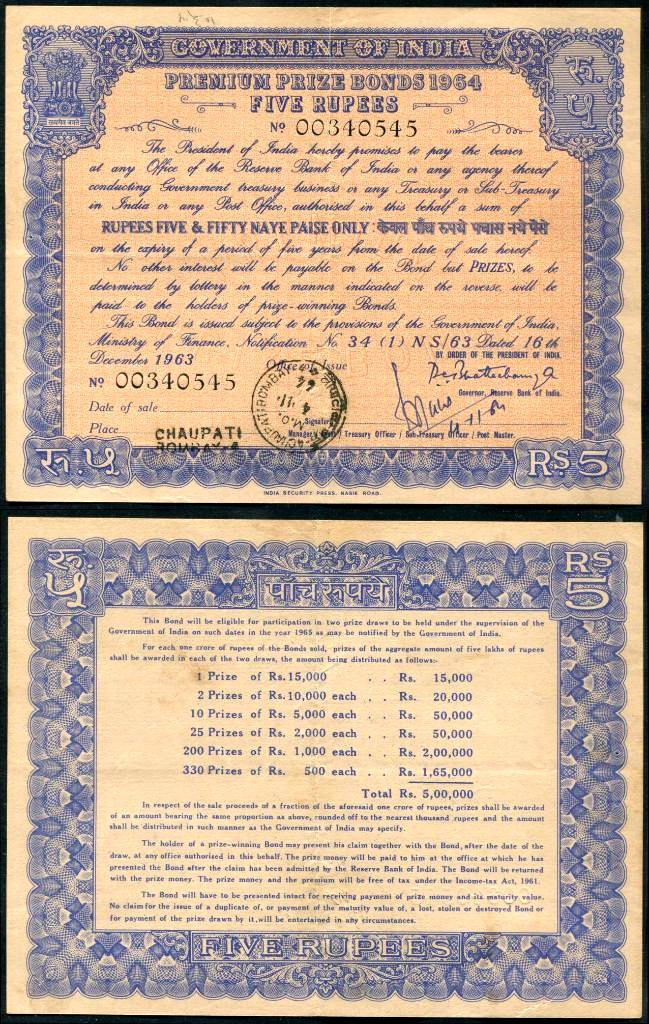
Similar prize schemes operate in other countries, for instance this Premium Prize Bond certificate from India

Premium Bonds under various names exist or have existed in various countries. Similar programmes to UK Premium Bonds include:

- In the Republic of Ireland, Prize Bonds have been running since early 1957.
- In Sweden, Premieobligationer (lit. Premium bonds) usually run for five years and are traded on Nasdaq OMX Stockholm. The unit (one Bond) is generally 1000 SEK or 5000 SEK. Holders of 10 or 50 consecutive bonds starting at 1 + N * 10 or 50 are guaranteed one win per year. Outstanding bonds as of September 2013 were around 28.9 billion SEK.
- In Denmark, Præmieobligation (lit. Premium bonds) usually ran for five or 10 years with a fixed prize list printed on the physical bonds. They were physical bearer bonds and most series were extended one or more times by another 5 or 10 years. The last series have now ended and must be redeemed for their principal cash within 10 years of the final ending dates. The bonds were generally identified by their colour, for instance the blue premium bonds were issued in 1948, and were redeemed in 1998 (10 years + 4 10-year extension). The first 200 DKK of each prize was tax free, the rest taxed at only 15% (compared to 30% or more for ordinary income).
- In New Zealand, "Bonus Bonds" were established by the NZ Government in 1970 and sold to ANZ Bank in 1990. In August 2020 it was announced that the scheme would close due to low interest rates reducing the prize pool. At the time of the announcement there were 1.2m bondholders with NZD $3.2 billion invested.

=== Unrelated concepts ===
In 2023, American economist Paul Krugman used the name "premium bonds" for an unrelated type of bond that he proposed to avoid a default due to the United States debt ceiling.

== Academic studies ==
In 2008, two financial economists, Lobe and Hoelzl, analysed the main driving factors for the immense marketing success of Premium Bonds. One in three Britons invest in Premium Bonds. The thrill of gambling is significantly boosted by enhancing the skewness of the prize distribution. However, using data collected over the past fifty years, they found that the bond bears relatively low risk compared to many other investments.

Aaron Brown discusses in a 2006 book Premium Bonds in comparison with equity-linked, commodity-linked and other "added risk" bonds. His conclusion is that it makes little difference, either to a retail investor or from a theoretical finance perspective, whether the added risk comes from a random number generator or from fluctuations in financial markets.

== See also ==
- Prize-linked savings accounts are savings accounts which use a similar system to grant interest
