= NTT Data Payment Services =

Indian Financial Services Company

NTT DATA Payment Services India
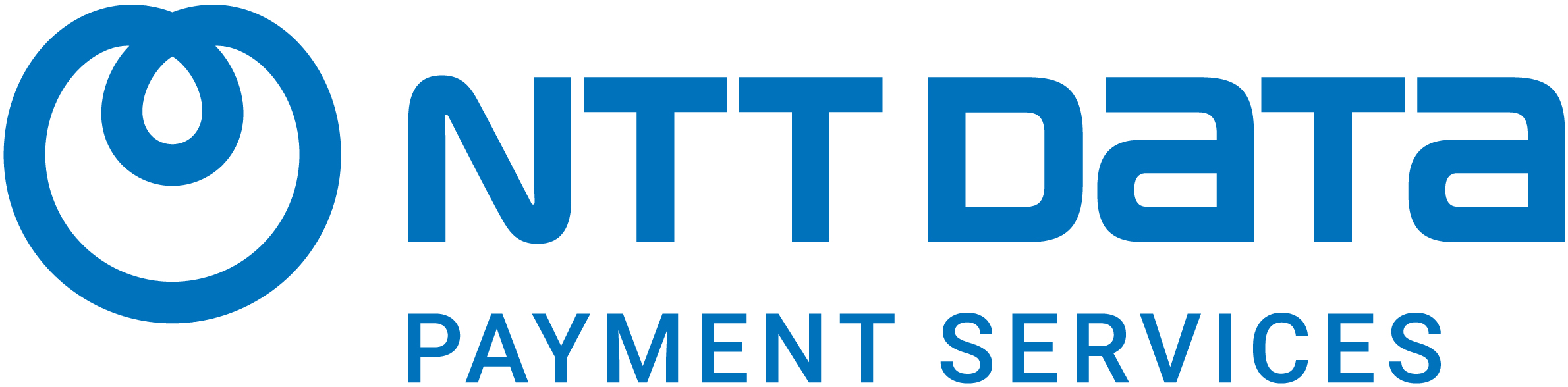
- Company type: Subsidiary
- Industry: Digital Payment Solutions
- Founded: 2006; 20 years ago
- Headquarters: 11th Floor, B4/B5, Nirlon Knowledge Park, Off Western Express Highway, Cama Industrail Estate, Goregaon, Mumbai, Maharashtra, 400063, India
- Key people: Takeo Ueno (CEO)
- Parent: NTT Data
- Website: in.nttdatapay.com

NTT DATA Payment Services India (formerly known as Atom Technologies Limited) is a payment services provider company headquartered in Mumbai, India.

== History ==
Atom was started in 2006 as a subsidiary of the Financial Technologies Group, founded by Jignesh Shah. The company has historically focused on the distribution of payment and banking services through the use of mobile technology. Atom Technologies has provided products and services for mobile payments, interactive voice response (IVR)-based payments, and mobile-based service distribution frameworks.

=== Acquisition ===
NTT DATA Payment Services India, in November 2018 announced that it had entered into an agreement to acquire a majority stake in Atom Technologies.

== Products ==
Atom Technologies' products include:

- Online banking and internet payment gateway (IPG): An internet payments platform
- Interactive voice response (IVR): helps organizations accept payments through credit and debit card over a phone call
- Mobile computing app that enables payment services. The Atom mobile app allows payments through debit and credit cards, IMPS, cash cards, and net banking
- Point of sale to provide payment services, Atom provides brick and mortar merchant, acquiring and transaction processing services, in addition to its services over the Internet, IVR and Mobile.

== Security ==
The company's payment platforms have been accredited for PCIDSS & PA-DSS certifications which are accepted by the banking industry and hence ascertain the security of its mobile payment transactions and the transmission of cardholder data.

NTT DATA Payment Services India payment platform uses Advanced Encryption Standard 128 Bit cipher block chaining for routing transactions using secure VPN connectivity. Atom does not store any credit card details but acts as a pass-through to the bank's payment gateway for routing transactions.

== Partnerships ==
NTT DATA Payment Services India has tie-ups with major banks apart from credit card companies like Visa Inc., MasterCard, and American Express. The credit cards of these banks and companies can be used to transact on the Atom platform. More than 1500 merchants have tied up with Atom to provide these payment services.
