= Indian Energy Exchange =

Indian Electrical power company

Indian Energy Exchange Limited
- Type: Public
- Traded as: BSE: 540750; NSE: IEX
- Industry: Power exchange
- Founded: 2008
- Headquarters: New Delhi, India
- Products: Electrical power Energy exchange
- Services: Power trading
- Revenue: ▼₹474 crore (US$49 million) (FY23)
- Net income: ▼₹305 crore (US$32 million) (FY23)
- Subsidiaries: Indian Gas Exchange
- Website: www.iexindia.com

The Indian Energy Exchange (IEX) is an Indian electronic system based power trading exchange regulated by the Central Electricity Regulatory Commission (CERC). IEX started its operations on 27 June 2008. Indian Energy Exchange pioneered the development of power trading in India and provides an electronic platform to the various participants in power market, comprising State Electricity Boards, Power producers (Gencos), Power traders, and Open Access Consumers (both Industrial & Commercial).

IEX is one of the two operational Power Exchanges in India. Ever since its incorporation, it has held an influential market share. IEX operates a day-ahead market based on closed auctions with double-sided bidding and uniform pricing; it has over 3,800 registered clients, over 300 private generators, and more than 3,300 industrial electricity consumers.

== Promoters ==
63 Moon Technologies Limited made an impulsive thrust into India's Power Sector by launching the Indian Energy Exchange along with PTC India. The aim of the promoters was to magnify the unexplored potential of the Indian Power market and abridge the demand supply gap. Thereby creating a marketplace wherein players from different purposes may garner business potential.

== History ==
The concept of power exchange in India had its genesis in the year of 2005, post which, Financial Technologies Limited and Multi Commodity Exchange together yielded an application for setting up the nation's first power exchange. Since its development on 9 June 2008, IEX had recorded 37.4 million transactions, the same month that electricity prices on the exchange hit a record low 13 paisa/KWh. In November 2009, IEX won Best E-Enabled Customer Platform at the second annual India Power Awards for developing what was described as "a robust platform for energy trading.

== Operations ==
IEX was envisioned as a neutral platform where participants from different segments of the sector may participate and utilize the range of products and services to match their needs. The participants are required to bear a membership and participate in the bid for the respective product/service. The exchange has launched a range of products and are broadly classified as: Day Ahead, Term Ahead, Renewable Energy Certificates, and Energy Saving Certificates(Es Certs)

== Indian Gas Exchange ==
Indian Gas Exchange (IGX) is a wholly owned subsidiary of IEX, which involves in trading spot and forward contracts of Gas. The exchange has over 500 registered clients and 15 members. It currently operates from three physical hubs — Hazira, Dahej and KG Basin.

=== Shareholding ===
Shareholding of IGX as on 10 Mar 2021:

26% – National Stock Exchange of India

5% – Oil and Natural Gas Corporation

5% – Adani Gas

5% – Torrent Gas

5% – GAIL

Rest – Indian Energy Exchange and other Investors

== Controversies ==
=== Insider trading ===
In October 2025, the Securities and Exchange Board of India uncovered a ₹173 crore (US$18 million) insider-trading scam involving the IEX. A senior Central Electricity Regulatory Commission official allegedly leaked confidential market-coupling information to a former student, who profited by trading IEX put options before a major share-price drop. SEBI froze the gains and barred the accused from market activity pending further investigation.
