= Padru, Balotra =

Village in Rajasthan, India

Coordinates: 25°30′24″N 72°12′06″E

- Village
- Location in Rajasthan, India Padru, Balotra (India)
- Country: India
- State: Rajasthan
- District: Balotra district

Government
  - Type: Democratic
  - Body: Tehsil

Languages
  - Official: Hindi/Marwadi
- Time zone: UTC+5:30 (IST)
- Nearest city: Jodhpur, Balotra

Padru is a village in the Balotra district (formerly in the Barmer district) of Rajasthan, India.
