= Raamdeo Agrawal =

Businessman

- Education: Chartered accountant (Institute of Chartered Accountants of India)
- Occupations: Businessman, stock market investor
- Years active: 1987–present
- Known for: Co-founder of Motilal Oswal Group
- Spouse: Sunita Agarwal
- Children: 1
- Family: Marwari

Raamdeo Agrawal is an Indian businessman, stock market investor and Chairman of Motilal Oswal Group which he co-founded with Motilal Oswal in 1987. According to Forbes, he has a net worth of $1.7 billion as of April 2024.

== Early life ==
Agrawal was born in a middle-class Marwari family. Raamdeo is a chartered accountant from Institute of Chartered Accountants of India. He was raised in Raipur in Chhattisgarh, before moving to Mumbai for his CA studies. His ancestors belong to Rajasthan.

== Career ==
Agrawal pursued chartered accountancy in Mumbai and began his career as a sub-broker in 1987. He co-founded Motilal Oswal Financial Services and his family today owns about 36% of the company. In 1986, he wrote the book Corporate Numbers Game, along with co-author Ram K Piparia. He also authored the book The Art of Wealth Creation. Agrawal was awarded the Rashtriya Samman Patra by Central Board of Direct Taxes for a consistent track record of highest integrity in tax payments for a period of 5 years from FY95-FY99. He considers Warren Buffett as his mentor and says that his investment strategy is largely inspired by him.

== Investments ==
By the time Agrawal became a sub-broker, he was able to build a portfolio of 10 lac. This grew to almost 30 crore during the bull run of Harshad Mehta scam of the 1990s however it fell to 10 crore after the scam was exposed. Later he went to the US to meet his inspiration Mr Warren Buffett. Here he made a point to study all the letters of Buffett written to his company Berkshire Hathaway. Until this point he held 225 stocks in his portfolio which he later scaled down to just 15 stocks. Eventually by the year 2000, his portfolio grew to Rs 100 crore. Some of his notable and early investments were Hero Honda, Infosys and Eicher motors.

== Personal life ==
He is married to Mrs Sunita Agarwal and together they have a son named Vaibhav Agarwal. Their son was kidnapped from a hostel in 2005 when he was a student, and held for ransom. He was rescued by the police when they arrested the driver of the kidnappers who was fleeing with the ransom money.
