= Lottery bond =

Government bond that pays prizes instead of interest

Prize schedule and redemption terms of a Soviet 100-ruble lottery bond (1950).

Lottery bonds are a type of government bond in which some randomly selected bonds within the issue are redeemed at a higher value than the face value of the bond. Lottery bonds have been issued by public authorities in Belgium, Ireland, Pakistan, Sweden, New Zealand, the UK and other nations.

Outwardly, lottery bonds resemble ordinary fixed rate bonds; they have a fixed, though usually long, duration and either pay no interest or regular coupons. The individual bonds within each issue are numbered, like ordinary bonds, but the serial numbers serve a different function from ordinary bonds. For a lottery bond the serial number is an added incentive for the purchaser to buy the bond.

Although the details vary by bond and by issuer, the principle remains the same. A drawing takes place according to a schedule to decide which serial numbers are to be redeemed. The individual bonds within the issue thus identified by the drawing are then bought back by the issuer, so that the total value of an issue will decrease as time passes and more bonds are redeemed. A small number of bonds are redeemed for an amount greater than their face value. Hence the holder of that particular bond will have won the ‘lottery’. Lottery bonds are similar to prize-linked savings accounts.

== Example ==
If the government of Belgium issues a 10-year lottery bond to finance re-gilding the Atomium, the issue may consist of 10,000 individual bonds with a face value of EUR 1,000. The coupon rate is reasonable to attract investors, but not high. However, the issuer has committed to redeem 5,000 of the 10,000 bonds issued before the bond's maturity date and has further committed to redeem 120 of these at a redemption value of EUR 1,250.

This means that any purchaser of a single bond for EUR 1,000 will receive annual interest a little above the bank rate, but will also have a 1.2% chance of winning an additional 25% of their original investment.

So the issuer borrows 10,000 * 1,000 EUR which is 10 Million Euros. It will repay 120 of those bonds at 1,250 EUR which is equal to 150,000 EUR and a further 9,880 at 1,000 EUR (9,880,000 EUR) making a total of 10,030,000 Euros, or 100.3% of the original borrowing. The issuer will also pay interest on any unredeemed bonds.

== Purpose ==
Lottery bonds are usually issued in a period where investor zeal is low and the government may see an issue failing to sell. By knowing ahead of time when the coupons will be paid and how many bonds will be redeemed at the original value and at the lottery value, the issuer can value the bond accurately and know ahead of time the cost of the borrowing.

The purchaser, however, is subject to the element of chance, as it is not known in advance which actual bonds will be redeemed at either value, nor when. This element of chance appeals to a section of society who will take a lower guaranteed return in the hope of a windfall.

== UK Premium Bonds ==
The earliest recorded lottery bond in UK was in 1694, called Million Lottery, where people purchased lottery tickets (priced £1 million in total) that doubled as a bond that matured in 16 years. Equivalently, they were bonds with annual interest rate 10+x%, where x is drawn from a lottery that gave x = 1.5 effectively. The tickets themselves remained a tradable commodity after the lottery draw (in November 1694), because each ticket still yielded £1 a year for 16 years. The price of a ticket fluctuated around £5-8 during 1694-1701. This proved popular and the government repeated this until 1769.

The government of the UK offers a variation on the standard Lottery Bond. Through the NS&I (National Savings and Investment), the public can purchase Premium Bonds worth £1 each, with a minimum spend of £25. The maximum number of Bonds that an individual can hold is £50,000.

The bonds themselves attract no interest, are perpetual and are redeemable at par (face value) at any time. The attraction for an investor is that, each month, a draw takes place and, should an investor hold one of the bond numbers chosen, then the bond-holder will be awarded a prize of variable value. Prizes (which vary between £25 and £1 million) can be reinvested – subject to a £50,000 cap – or can be paid out.

All prizes are tax free and, with approximately 84 billion bonds issued, the chances of any one bond winning a prize for a given month are approximately 24500 to 1. However, if a bond wins a prize, that bond is not redeemed but remains 'in the pool' for all forthcoming draws (at least until the bond-holder decides to redeem it.).

The prize fund is paid for out of the equivalent interest payable on the entire bond pool for that month. As of 2020 the prize fund rate is 4.65% implying that a bond holder can expect to achieve a mean long term return of 4.65% per annum. In reality, the nature of a lottery bond means that median returns are lower and are increasing in the number of bonds held.
