= Fixed-income relative-value investing =

Investment strategy

Fixed-Income Relative-Value Investing (FI-RV) is a hedge fund investment strategy made popular by the failed hedge fund Long-Term Capital Management. FI-RV Investors most commonly exploit interest-rate anomalies in the large, liquid markets of North America, Europe and the Pacific Rim. The financial instruments traded include government bonds, interest rate swaps and futures contracts.

== Investment Strategy ==
Most FI-RV Investors focus on large, long-term mispricings in the global Fixed income markets - described below - capturing relative-value anomalies. Trades of interest include:

- Yield Curve: Trade LIBOR yield curve using combinations of futures and swaps of varying maturities.
- Bond vs Bond: Identify and trade bonds that are mispriced compared to other very similar bonds.
- LIBOR vs Bond: Take advantage of anomalies in the spread between Bond and Libor Curves.

Frequently, these above described anomalies occur when market participants are forced to make non-economic decisions due to accounting regulations, book clean-up, public furor or exuberance over a certain product, or sheer panic. The FI-RV Investor aims to capitalize on these and other inefficiencies. When a mispricing is identified between products, FI-RV Investors have the freedom to wait until the anomaly corrects. In contrast, other market participants, such as bank proprietary desks, are often limited by balance sheet considerations and accounting standards which influence the size and timing of their trades.

However, the irony of Long-Term Capital Management's failure is that although they were correct on all of their trades and hedges, they just did not have the excess collateral to meet the margin calls after the Russian financial crisis hit in 1998. In an interview, fund manager Bob Treue, who had started a hedge fund specifically to capitalize on the opportunities left over by LTCM's failure, stated that excess collateral is the key to the survival of a fixed-income relative-value strategy, and that this is the primary reason LTCM failed. Further, LTCM's failure has had an enormous impact on the public perception of the fixed-income relative-value space, possibly an irreversible impact, with investors fearing the strategy too risky.

== Relative value ==
=== Classic arbitrage ===
In times when there are dramatic flows into or out of a specific asset, there can be disparate pricings on products that are, for all economic purposes, identical. The FI-RV Investor can capture these inefficiencies by combining bonds, swaps, options, currencies and/or futures into products that replicate another product in every sense.

One example of this occurred in late 1998. The Euro had been defined as .6242 Deutsche Marks, 1.332 French francs, .08784 British pounds, 151.8 Italian Lira, .2198 Dutch Guilder, 3.431 Belgian Franc, 6.885 Spanish Peseta, .1976 Danish Krone, .00855 Irish Punt, 1.44 Greek Drachma and 1.393 Portuguese Escudo. On December 31, 1998, the Euro would officially become a currency and these exchange rates would become irrevocable and trading Deutschemarks for Euros would be like exchanging nickels for dimes. Yet, leading up to this conversion, the demand for Euros was so incredibly high that one could buy all of the constituent currencies of the Euro for 98.25% of the value of the Euro and then sell the Euro itself for its full value. This was caused when corporates, governments and banks had decided that after January 1, 1999, the majority of their electronic billing and transfers would be done in Euros. So naturally, these entities (who aren't interested in buying 11 currencies in hopes of exchanging them later) went out and started buying Euros in anticipation of European Monetary Union. The flows from this were dominant and pushed the value of the now favored Euro out of line with its parts.

=== Yield curve anomalies ===
At various times, yield curves will be hit by a wave of purchases or sales in a specific area of the curve. This will cause that area to form a 'trough' or 'hump' to it. By exploiting this odd shape through receiving the high rates around 'hump' and paying the low rates within the trough, The FI-RV Investor hopes to profit by waiting until the yield curve normalizes.

An example of this type of distortion occurred in late 1994 and early 1995 when Alan Greenspan raised the US Fed Funds rate from 3.00% in May 1994 to 5.25% in February 1995. Prior to these hikes, Orange County had initiated highly leveraged bets on short maturity interest rate derivative products in the hopes that interest rates would decline. As short maturity rates moved higher as a result of continued action on the part of the US central bank, market participants, including Orange County, were forced to exit out of their short end positions. The leveraged nature of Orange County's positions and its imminent bankruptcy forced them to continue to dump risk at a time when the financial markets were unwilling to receive it.

In addition to loss management and panic, a second powerful force drove traders out of the short end of the curve. At the time, Orange County was ridiculed by the press for their imprudence with the public's money. In fear that year end accounting would reveal that they held similar positions to the 'toxic waste' which poisoned Orange County, traders stampeded out of short end positions.

=== Credit spreads ===
The FI-RV also seeks to take advantage of periodic mispricings between LIBOR (London Inter-Bank Offered Rate, essentially AAA and AA rated credit) and government credit. Since all of the major futures exchanges list both LIBOR (or the respective national equivalent) based contracts and government bond contracts, a fund such as The FI-RV Investor can take advantage of opportunities in this area of relative value as well. Frequently, as the credit concerns of either banks, governments or corporations comes into question, the spreads between these issuers moves quite substantially.

In the fall/winter of 1998, Long Term Capital Management's Long term capital management takeover prompted rumors in the market that unwinds of their positions would be forthcoming. Hedge Funds would be forced to liquidate their long German Asset spreads (long German government credit against short bank credit in Deutschemarks) and their short Sterling Asset Spreads (short English government credit and long bank credit in British Pounds). At the time, the British Government had paused in its debt issuance and was running a small budget surplus, while the Germans had just elected a left leaning government and had large pension liabilities as well as a deficit in excess of 2% of GDP for 1998. Based on these fundamentals, the credit spread between government bonds and banks should have been larger in Britain than in Germany, but the crucial question was 'How much larger should the spread be?' The credit spreads for 5 yr. bonds started 1998 around 40 basis points in Britain and near 15 basis points in Germany. As news of problems in the Hedge Fund industry and potential credit unwinds began to permeate the market, the British spread exploded out to 140 basis points in October of '98 while the German spread managed only a meager move to 20 basis points. Although the British spreads deserved to be wider, they did not merit a 120 basis point premium over German Spreads. By November 1998, the premium had already contracted to 80 basis points.

== Global macro ==
Market imbalances can cause fundamental, as well as relative, mispricings. These anomalies are more difficult to capitalize on since you must make assumptions as to where inflation, GDP, trade balance, etc. will be in the future. In addition, the fundamentals themselves are not tradable; you must employ market instruments as a proxy. While acknowledging the limiting nature of these assumptions, The FI-RV Investor will trade certain products that are mispriced from a fundamental prospective. For example, the 10 yr. bond contract in Japan had a yield of 0.70% as of early November 1998. This seemed inconsistent with long term expectations of the fundamentals. The Japanese Government was set to run the largest deficit in the history of the world (in absolute terms) and the Bank of Japan had said that they were going to target monetary growth rather than inflation. These policies would seem to create an enormous amount of new bond issuance and some future inflation due to the monetary growth. The variables which pushed yields to this low level could not last forever. The Japanese had been hurt in every investment they had made over the previous few years (Tokyo real estate prices were down 75% from their highs, the Nikkei had gone from 40,000 in January 1990 to 14,000 in November 1998 and the Yen had gone from 82 in April 1995 to 123 in November 1998, stopping at 145 along the way) and as a result, the Japanese had bought up bonds. The JGBs (Japanese Government Bonds) had given them nothing but gains and assurance of capital. It was no longer an issue of return on capital, but rather return of capital. With yields at this low level though, the market seemed to have made the assumption that a strong or even neutral economy would never return to Japan. By the spring of 1999, yields had risen to the 1.5-2.0% range from the 0.70% of early November 1998

=== Volatility ===
Occasionally, The FI-RV Investor will trade volatility. In the hedge fund unwind panic of October 1998, equity volatility on the S&P soared to around 40%. This unusual premium proved excessive and as of November 1998, these volatilities had returned to the high 20s. Also, sometimes volatility products will be used as a tool to implement the previously mentioned arbitrage strategies.
