= 63 Moons Technologies =

Indian fintech company

63 moons technologies
- Formerly: Financial Technologies (India) Limited
- Company type: Public
- Traded as: BSE: 526881; NSE: 63MOONS
- Industry: Computer services on finance/banking
- Founded: 12 April 1988
- Headquarters: Mumbai, India
- Key people: S Rajendran (Managing Director and CEO); Venkat Chary (Chairman)
- Products: Software
- Revenue: ₹1.1816 billion (US$12 million) (March 2025)
- Number of employees: 378 (March 2025)
- Website: www.63moons.com

63 Moons Technologies Limited (stylised as 63 moons technologies), known as Financial Technologies (India) Limited until 2016, is an Indian technology company which provides financial platforms and supports the creation of digital marketplaces.

== History ==
The company was founded in 1988 by Jignesh Shah and is headquartered in Mumbai, India. It had its first IPO in 1995. The company introduced its first commodity derivatives trading platform, the Multi Commodity Exchange (MCX) in 2003. FTIL has divested of its domestic and international ventures.

The company’s name was officially changed to 63 Moons Technologies Limited on 27 May 2016, after receiving approval from the Registrar of Companies following a one-year process.

=== NSEL case ===
In July 2013, the National Spot Exchange, owned by 63 moons technologies limited (then FTIL), suspended trading following an order by the Department of Consumer Affairs to settle all existing contracts and not launch any fresh contracts, which led to a payment default crisis of ₹5,600 crore. Investigations led by the Enforcement Directorate and Economic Offences Wing revealed the role of brokers and defaulters in the NSEL case. The brokers mis-sold NSEL products to their clients by assuring them fixed returns. The defaulters hypothecated stocks, produced fake warehouse receipts and siphoned the entire default money. In 2022, the Supreme Court allowed NSEL to use the MPID Act to recover dues; although assets worth ₹888 crore of 63 moons were attached in 2019, they were later released due to lack of proof. In November 2025, the NCLT approved a ₹1,950 crore one-time settlement by 63 moons for large creditors, offering partial recoveries in return for ending cases and transferring recovery rights to the company, helping move the resolution forward.

== Operations ==
=== Exchanges ===
The company launched many domestic and international ventures. It owned several subsidiaries that included National Bulk Handling Corporation (NHBC), Multi Commodity Exchange (MCX), Dubai Gold & Commodities Exchange (DGCX), Indian Energy Exchange (IEX), MCX Stock Exchange (MCX-SX), Singapore Mercantile Exchange (SMX) and Bourse Africa. In October, 2010, Financial Technologies (India) launched Global Board Of Trade (GBOT), an international multi–asset exchange in Mauritius. In February 2011, Financial Technologies launched Bahrain Financial Exchange (BFX), the first multi–asset exchange in the Middle East and North Africa.

=== Software ===
- Distributed Order Matching Engines (DOME) is an order matching system
- MATCH; it is an enterprise application integration tool
- ODIN was used for trading in securities and commodities. As of 2020, ODIN accounted for around 70% of the retail broking market share in trading software.
- STP-Gate, launched in 2017, is a straight-through processing system for the Indian financial markets, which was sold to Synapsewave Innovations in August 2024.

=== Subsidiaries ===
- Atom Technologies is a digital payment service providers, offering payment collection facilities. FTIL divested a controlling stake to NTT Data Corporation in late 2018.
- TickerPlant is an analytics platform with streaming of market information of exchanges. It also launched its cryptocurrency super application called CryptoWire.
- 63 SATS is a cybersecurity arm of the company which operates a centralised information security operations center (SOC) on a decentralized network protocol. The new division founded in 2023-24 is advised by Yigal Unna, Former Director General of the Israeli National Cyber Directorate.

== See also ==
- List of stock exchanges
