= Federal Deposit Insurance Act =

The Federal Deposit Insurance Act of 1950, Pub. L. 81–797, 64 Stat. 873, enacted September 21, 1950 by the 81st United States Congress and signed into law by Harry S. Truman is a statute that governs the Federal Deposit Insurance Corporation (FDIC). The FDIC was originally created by the Banking Act of 1933, which amended the Federal Reserve Act of 1913.
