= Mercury Technologies =

American financial technology company

Mercury
- Industry: Financial technology
- Founded: 2017; 9 years ago
- Founders: Immad Akhund; Max Tagher; Jason Zhang
- Headquarters: San Francisco, California, United States
- Key people: Immad Akhund (CEO); Max Tagher (CTO); Jason Zhang (COO)
- Products: Banking services
- Number of employees: 800 (2024)
- Website: mercury.com

Mercury Technologies Inc., commonly known as simply Mercury, is an American fintech company that provides banking services to start-up companies and small businesses. The company is not a bank, but works with banking service providers to provide bank accounts and other financial services. The company was founded in 2017 in San Francisco, California. As of May 2026, Mercury has a $5.2 billion valuation.

== History ==
Mercury was founded in 2017 by Immad Akhund, Max Tagher, and Jason Zhang. Mercury's business bank accounts launched in 2019. In March 2022, the company began offering venture debt services to its customers. In September 2022, the company launched a corporate charge card.

The company reportedly gained a significant number of new customers and deposits in the wake of the March 2023 Silicon Valley Bank failure.

In April 2024, Mercury launched personal banking for consumers. In May 2024, Mercury launched financial software to help businesses pay bills, send invoices and reimburse employees.

In June 2024, one of Mercury's partner banks, Evolve Bank & Trust, suffered a major data breach that included account numbers and deposit balances for Mercury accounts. The ransomware group LockBit took credit for the attack. In October 2024, Mercury added Plaid founder William Hockey's bank Column as a new partner bank.

In March 2025, Mercury announced it planned to cut ties with Evolve Bank & Trust, and migrate customers to one of its other partner banks, Column N.A. and Choice Financial Group, by the end of 2025.

In March 2025, Mercury raised $300 million in its Series C round, doubling its valuation to $3.5 billion from its 2021 Series B funding round. The Series C was led by Sequoia Capital and new including Spark Capital and Marathon, as well as returning investors Coatue, CRV and Andreessen Horowitz. In 2024, Mercury had $500 million revenue, and had $156 billion in payment volume. Mercury added Timothy Mayopoulos, the FDIC appointed interim head of Silicon Valley Bank, to its board of directors.

In April 2026, Mercury received conditional approval from the Office of the Comptroller of the Currency for a national bank charter. This was followed by a $200 million Series D round at a $5.2 billion valuation in May of 2026.

== Business ==
Mercury offers banking services to customers, primarily startups.

In 2021, the company operated Mercury Raise, a service connecting customers with investors.

The company is not a chartered bank, and is therefore unable to lend against deposits. Instead, it partners with regional bank networks to hold customer's deposits. As of 2024, its principle bank partners were North Dakota-based Choice Bank, which has a network of regional banks, and California-based Column. This gives customers access to a sweep network of other banks such as Goldman Sachs and Capital One. Customer deposits of up to $5 million can be spread out across multiple accounts that are each under the FDIC's $250,000 insurance limit.

In 2024, the company began to offer a corporate credit card, and branded it Mercury IO.
