= Forward Markets Commission =

Indian financial market regulator

Agency overview
- Formed: 1953; 73 years ago
- Dissolved: 2015; 11 years ago
- Superseding agency: Securities and Exchange Board of India
- Jurisdiction: India
- Headquarters: Mumbai, Maharashtra
- Agency executive: Ramesh Abhishek, Chairman
- Website: http://www.fmc.gov.in

The Forward Markets Commission (FMC) was the regulatory body for the commodity market and futures market in India. It was under the Ministry of Finance, Government of India. In July 2014, it regulated Rs 17 trillion worth of commodity trades in India. It was headquartered in Mumbai. The Commission allowed commodity trading in 22 exchanges in India, of which 6 are national.

On 28 September 2015, the FMC was merged with the Securities and Exchange Board of India (SEBI) to make the regulation of commodity futures market strong.

== History ==
Established in 1953 under the provisions of the Forward Contracts (Regulation) Act, 1952, it consisted of not less than two but not exceeding four members appointed by the central government, out of them one being nominated by the central government to be the chairman of the commission.

Since futures traded in India were traditionally on food commodities, the agency was originally overseen by Ministry of Consumer Affairs, Food and Public Distribution (India).

The commission appeared in the news in March 2012 for their ban on guar gum futures trading after it said the price quadrupled due to its use in fracking causing food inflation.

In September 2013, the commission responsibility was moved to the Ministry of Finance to reflect that futures trading was becoming more and more a financial activity.

=== Development of the Industry ===
India has a long history of trading commodities and considered the pioneer in some forms of derivatives trading. The first derivative market was set up in 1875 in Mumbai, where cotton futures was traded. This was followed by establishment of futures markets in edible oilseeds complex, raw jute and jute goods and bullion. This became an active industry with volumes reported to be large.

However, in 1935 a law was passed allowing the government to in part restrict and directly control food production (Defence of India Act, 1935). This included the ability to restrict or ban the trading in derivatives on those food commodities. Post independence, in the 1950s, India continued to struggle with feeding its population and the government increasingly restricting trading in food commodities. Just at the time the FMC was established, the government felt that derivative markets increased speculation which led to increased costs and price instabilities. And in 1953 finally prohibited options and futures trading altogether.

The industry was pushed underground and the prohibition meant that development and expansion came to a halt. In the 1970 as futures and options markets began to develop in the rest of the world, Indian derivatives markets were left behind. The apprehensions about the role of speculation, particularly in the conditions of scarcity, prompted the government to continue the prohibition well into the 1980s.

The result of the period of prohibition left India with a large number of small and isolated regional futures markets. The futures markets were dispersed and fragmented, with separate trading communities in different regions with little contact with one another. The exchanges had not yet embrace modern technology or modern business practices.

Next to the officially approved exchanges, there were also many havala markets. Most of these unofficial commodity exchanges have operated for many decades. Some unofficial markets trade 20–30 times the volume of the "official" futures exchanges. They offer not only futures, but also option contracts. Transaction costs are low, and they attract many speculators and the smaller hedgers. Absence of regulation and proper clearing arrangements, however, meant that these markets were mostly "regulated" by the reputation of the main players.

== Responsibilities and functions ==
The functions of the Forward Markets Commission were as follows:

- To advise the central government in respect of the recognition or the withdrawal of recognition from any association or in respect of any other matter arising out of the administration of the Forward Contracts (Regulation) Act 1952.
- To keep forward markets under observation and to take such action in relation to them, as it may consider necessary, in exercise of the powers assigned to it by or under the Act.
- To collect and whenever the Commission thinks it necessary, to publish information regarding the trading conditions in respect of goods to which any of the provisions of the act is made applicable, including information regarding supply, demand and prices, and to submit to the central government, periodical reports on the working of forward markets relating to such goods;
- To make recommendations generally with a view to improving the organization and working of forward markets;
- To undertake the inspection of the accounts and other documents of any recognized association or registered association or any member of such association whenever it considers it necessary.

It allowed futures trading in 23 fibers and manufacturers, 15 spices, 44 edible oils, 6 pulses, 4 energy products, single vegetable, 20 metal futures and 33 other futures.

== Commission ==
The three members of the commission were:

- Shri Ramesh Abhishek (Chairman) – Appointed 24 September 2012
- M. Mathisekaran
- Shri Nagendraa Parakh – appointed July 2013

== See also ==
- List of financial supervisory authorities by country
