= Money Dashboard =

- Industry: Personal finance, Software
- Founded: 2009
- Founder: Gavin Littlejohn
- Headquarters: Edinburgh, UK
- Area served: United Kingdom
- Products: Rich Internet application
- Website: www.moneydashboard.com

Money Dashboard was a free online personal financial management service in the United Kingdom. It provided users with the ability to view all of their online financial accounts in one place and categorises and analyses all of their transactions so they could understand how they use money. The app aimed to help consumers make better financial decisions and budget for the future.

The app was powered by Yodlee, an account aggregation service used by many of the world's leading banks and financial institutions.

The service was regarded as the UK's first significant personal finance service, an equivalent to Mint.com in the US, and promoted a strong emphasis on security. It was a read-only application and did not store users' bank account usernames, ID's or passwords; data services are handled by Yodlee.

In 2015, it was reported to be the UK's largest personal financial management (PFM) provider, having attracted over 100,000 users.

== History ==
Money Dashboard was started in 2009 by serial entrepreneur Gavin Littlejohn, and officially launched the first version of its service in 2011, which was developed with the intention to offer a free and easy solution to consumers who have lost control or who are struggling to control their finances. In 2012, the company launched the second version of its service. Since that time, it had continued to release upgrades to its service, including launching applications on both iOS and Android. This had included facilities to identify and promote money-saving opportunities to consumers, such as product switching.

In 2014, it was a founding member of the Financial Data and Technology Association (FDATA) a FinTech trade association that works with government, regulators and financial industry stakeholders to securely open up access to customer financial data, so that consumers can be empowered to have full control of their financial information and so make better decisions.

In 2015, Steve Tigar was appointed as CEO.

Money Dashboard, along with Moneybox and Plum, was among the new direct payment systems considered in the UK's Open Banking standard and implementation of the EU's Payment Services Directive also known as PSD2.

In May 2022 it was announced that Money Dashboard had been acquired by the ClearScore Group.

Both the web and mobile applications permanently closed to users on 31st October 2023.
