= N5 Now =

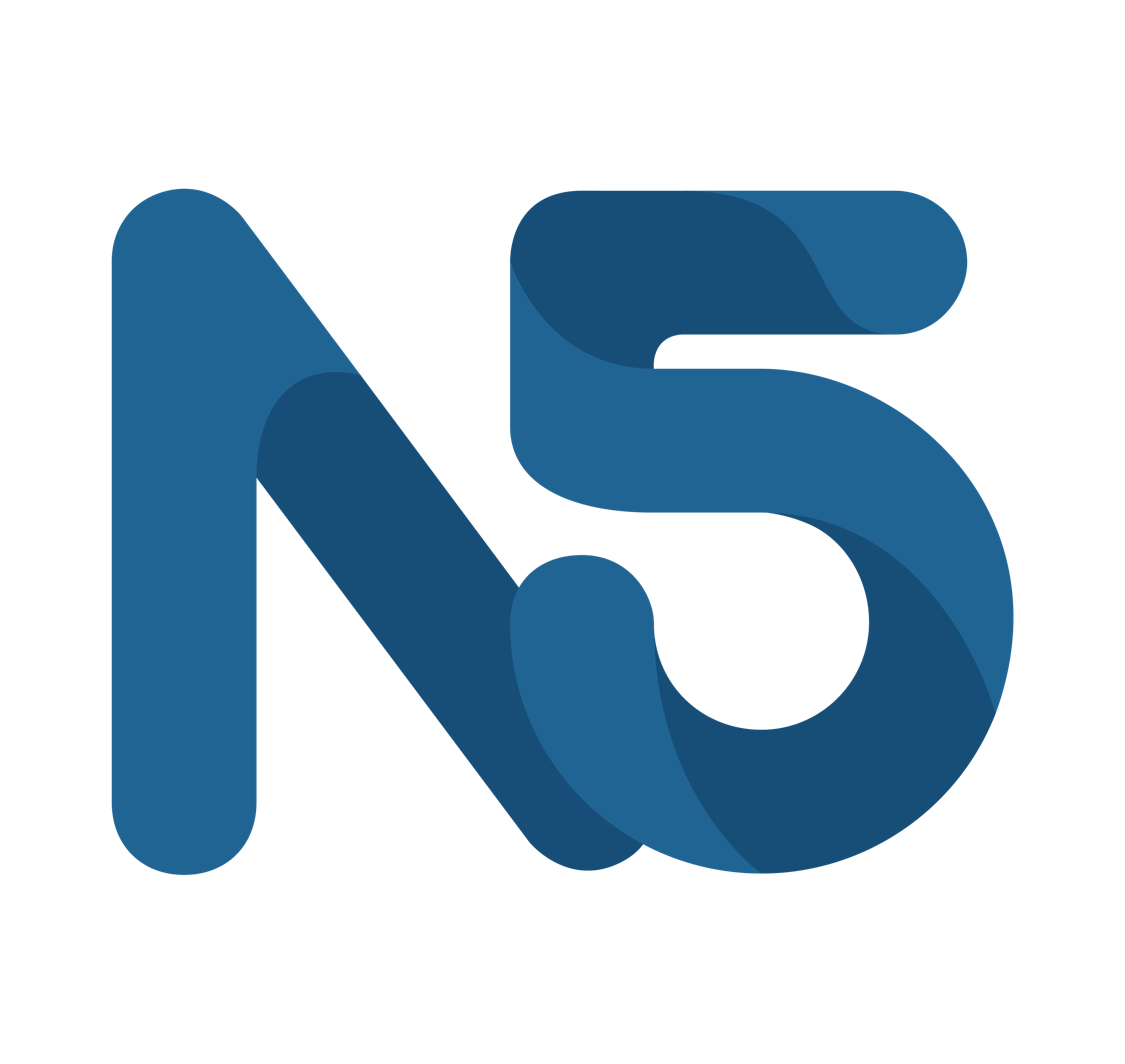
- Type: Private
- Industry: Software
- Founded: 2017
- Headquarters: Buenos Aires, Argentina
- Area served: Latin America, Europe, United States
- Key people: Julián Colombo (CEO)
- Products: Software for financial institutions
- Website: www.n5now.com

N5 Now is a software company that specializes in the finance industry. Founded in August 2017, N5 Now develops systems that integrate with existing legacy infrastructure that allow financial institutions to transition to digital platforms.

== History ==
N5 Now was founded in 2017 by former Santander executive Julián Colombo, who serves as the company's CEO. The company was originally focused on financial technology companies and soon started serving traditional banks and insurers.

In 2021, N5 Now was recognized as Startup of the Year in Latin America by Microsoft. In July 2022, the company received another award from Microsoft, "Best Platform 2022" for the platform's design for Openfinance (Openbanking and Openinsurance).

In September 2023, N5 secured investment from several venture capital firms, including Illuminate Financial, Exor Ventures, Madrone Capital Partners, LTS Investments, and Arpex Capital.

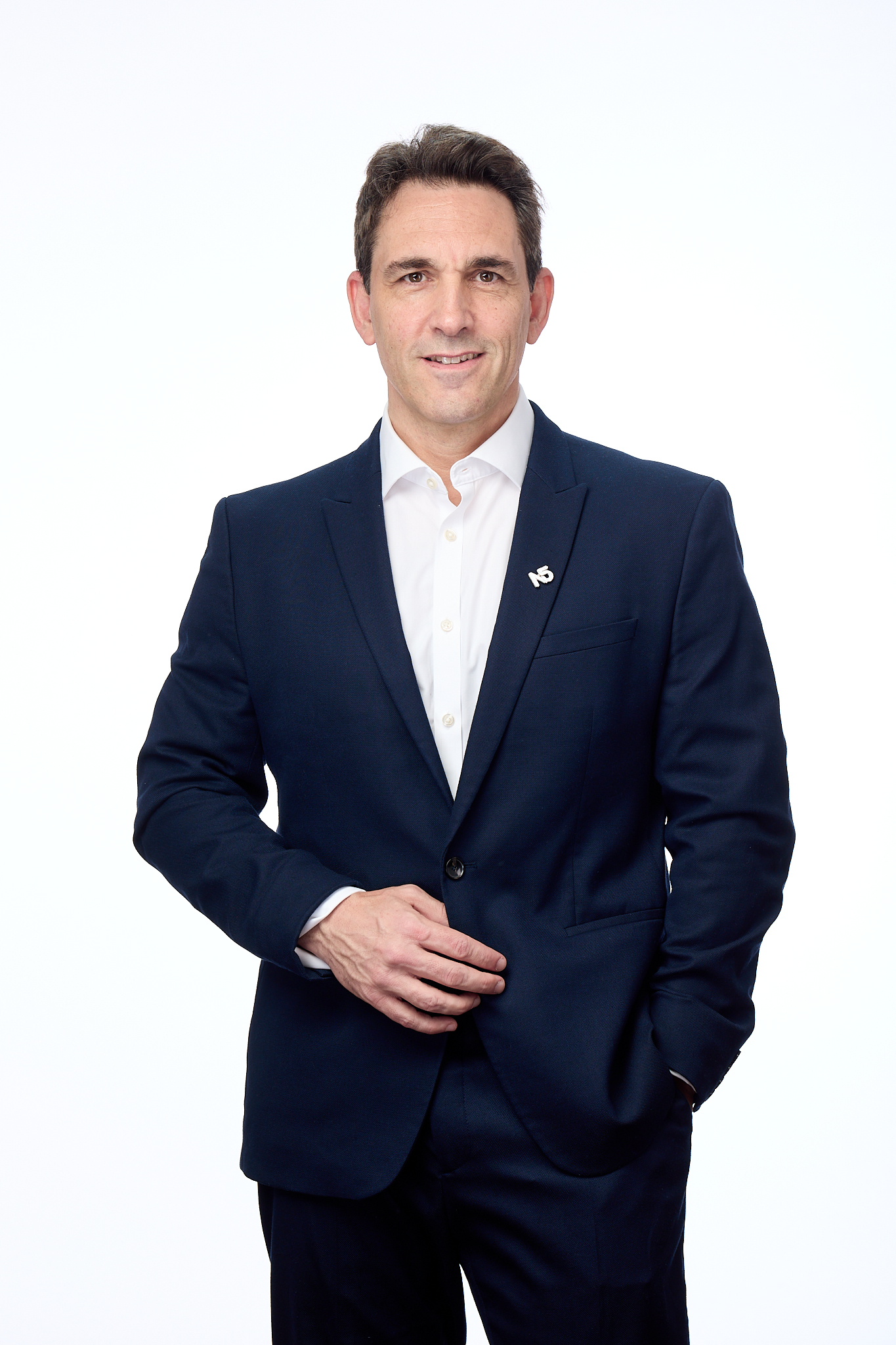
Julián Colombo, CEO of N5 Now

In 2024, the company launched artificial intelligence tools designed specifically for the financial sector that can be integrated into any core system, CRM or BPM.

== Activities ==
N5 Now platform integrates the back-end channels, processes, and systems, such as CRMs, BPMs, incentives, and Omnichannel.

The company is active in 15 countries in Latin America, Europe, and the US. Customers include Mastercard, Santander, Credicorp, Zurich Insurance, Atlas Bank, and N26.

N5 is headquartered in Buenos Aires, Argentina.
