= Andrew Moor =

British-Canadian banking executive (1959–2024)

Andrew Moor (1959–2025) was a British-Canadian banking executive who served as president and chief executive officer of Equitable Bank.

== Early life and education ==
Born in Sussex, England, Moor initially trained as a mechanical engineer in London before relocating to Canada, where he completed an MBA at the University of British Columbia in 1987.

== Career ==
After his MBA, Moor joined CIBC, returning to Canada in 1990. He later held senior executive roles, including chief financial officer and then CEO of modular furniture manufacturer SMED International, which was sold in 2000. He subsequently became president and CEO of the mortgage brokerage Invis until its acquisition by HSBC in 2006.

In 2007, Moor was appointed CEO of Equitable Trust. During the 2008 global financial crisis, he expanded Equitable's commercial lending operations, particularly focusing on underserved segments such as self-employed borrowers and individuals with non-traditional credit profiles. During his tenure, Equitable launched EQ Bank in 2016, a direct-to-consumer digital banking platform.

== Legacy ==
Moor died suddenly in 2025.

In 2026, the Open Banking Expo inaugurated the Andrew Moor Award in his honour, which recognises individuals who have made "an outstanding contribution to advancing Open Banking in Canada".
