= CommerceWest Bank =

United States commercial bank

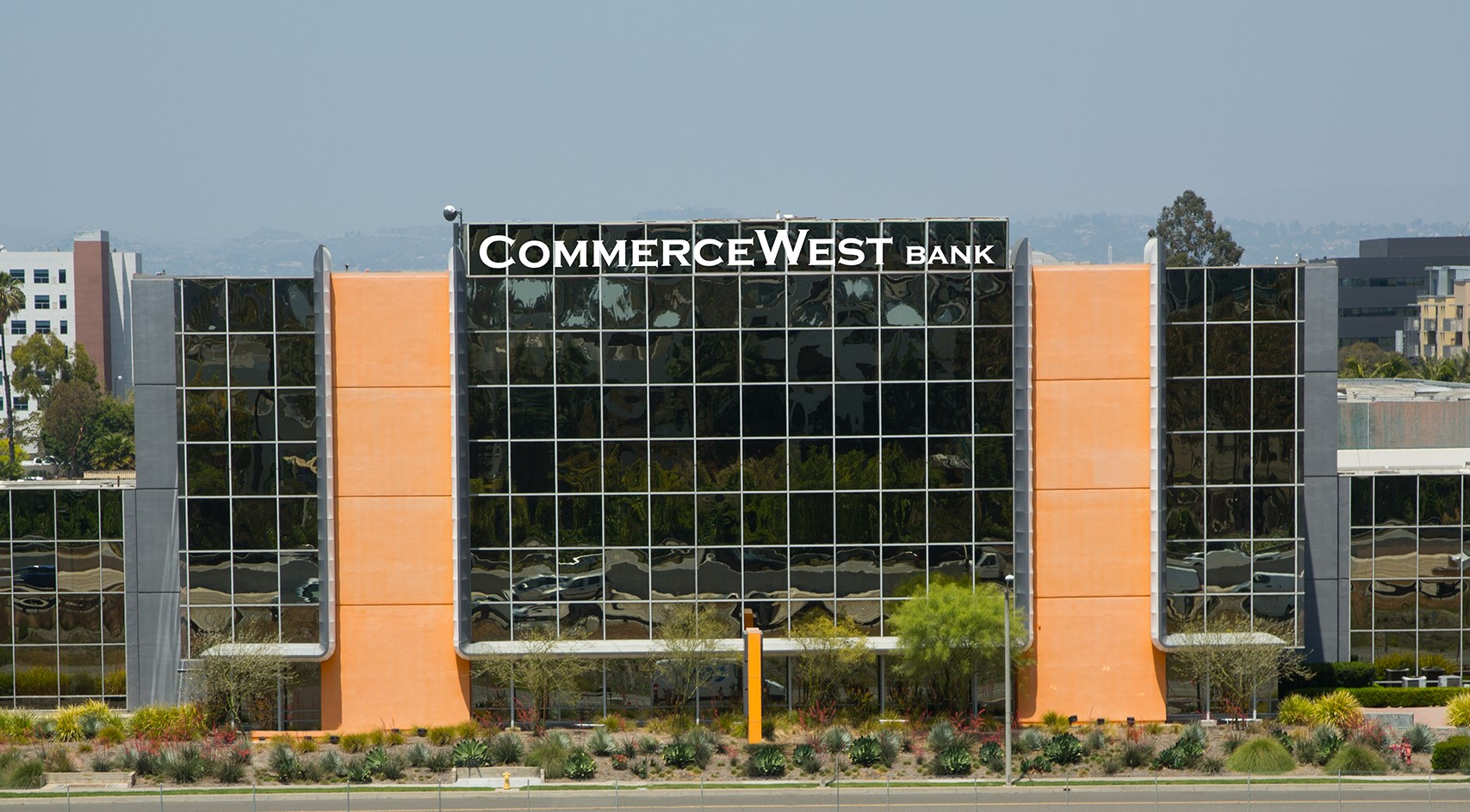
- Headquarters of CommerceWest Bank and parent company CW Bancorp
- Industry: Banking
- Founded: 2001; 25 years ago
- Founder: Ivo Tjan
- Headquarters: Irvine, California, United States
- Number of locations: 1
- Parent: CW Bancorp

CommerceWest Bank is a commercial financial institution headquartered in Irvine, California.

== History ==
CommerceWest Bank was founded in 2001 by Ivo Tjan and launched an Initial Public Offering in 2001. CW Bancorp is the holding company for CommerceWest Bank and has over $4 billion in total assets. The parent company is traded on the OTCQX as CWBK. CommerceWest Bank has 1 physical location following a 2020 branch consolidation and focuses on a more digital banking platform.

== Awards ==
CommerceWest Bank is recognized for 6 years as a Super Premier Performing Bank by the Findley Report. In 2019, the Bank was recognized as one of the fastest growing public companies in Orange County by the Orange County Business Journal.
