= Passbook =

Type of paper book in banking

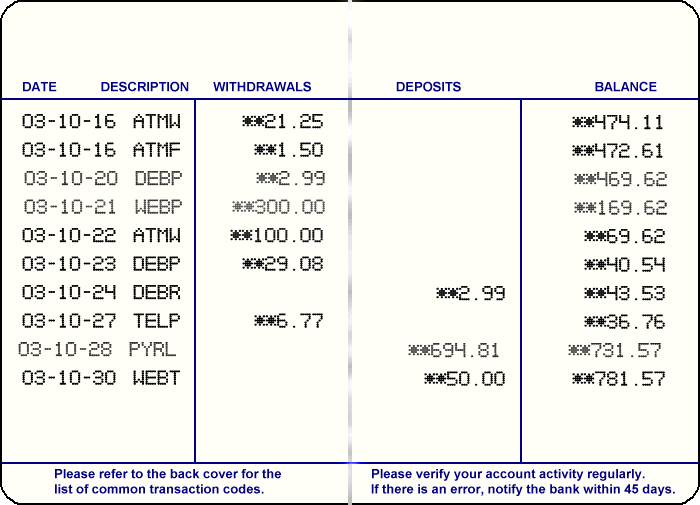
Sample passbook (open), containing the same transactions as the bank statement

A passbook or bankbook is a paper book used to record bank or building society transactions on a deposit account.

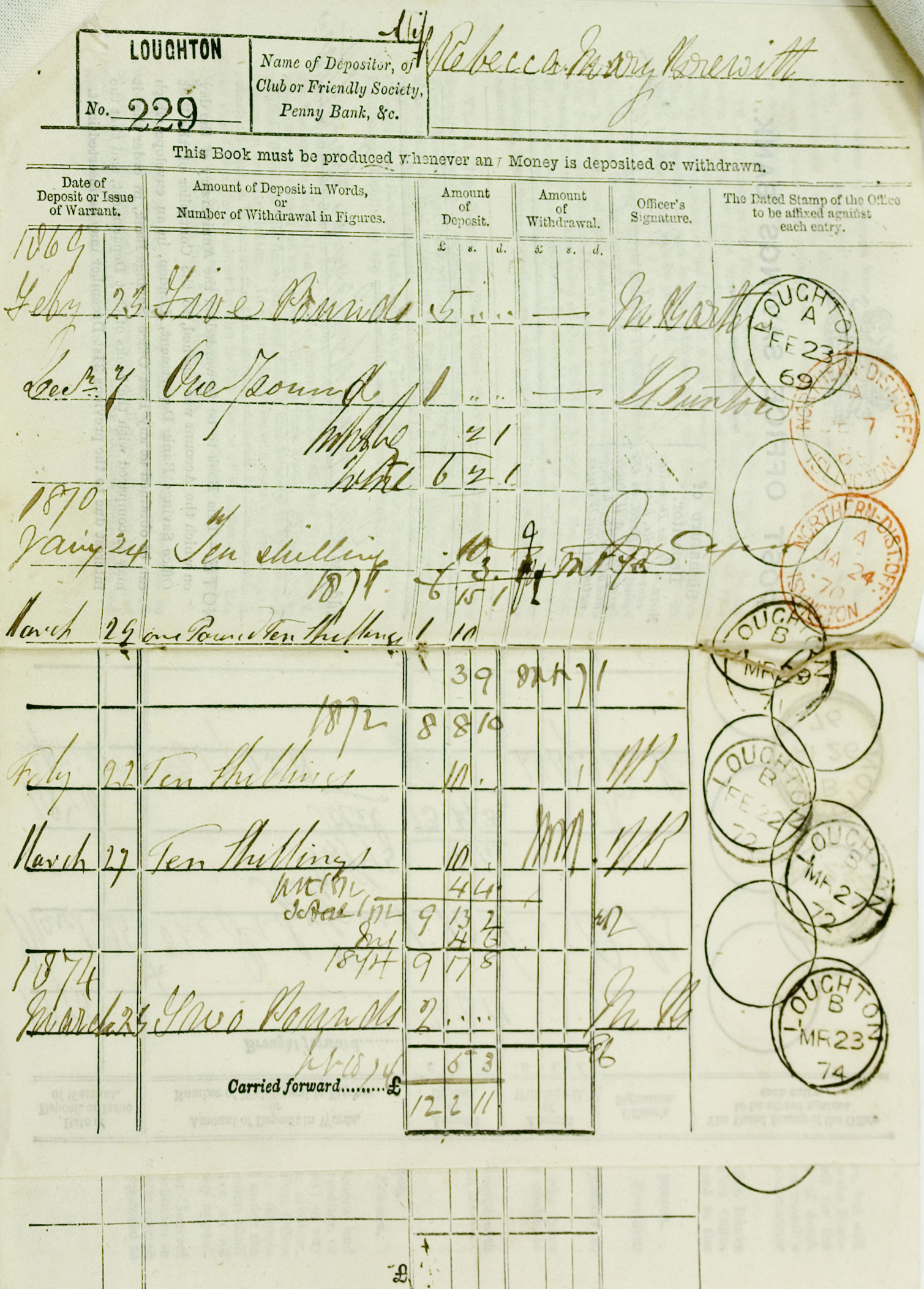
The Post Office Savings Bank introduced passbooks to rural 19th-century Britain.

Traditionally, a passbook was used for accounts with a low transaction volume, such as savings accounts. A bank teller or postmaster would write the date, amount of the transaction, and the updated balance and enter their initials by hand. In the late 20th century, small dot matrix or inkjet printers were introduced that were capable of updating the passbook at the account holder's convenience, either at an ATM or a passbook printer, either in a self-serve mode, by post, or in a branch.

== History ==
Passbooks appeared in the 18th century, allowing customers to hold transaction information in their own hands for the first time. Until then, transactions were recorded in ledgers at the bank only, so customers had no history of their own deposits and withdrawals.

The passbook, which was around the size of a passport, ensured that customers had control over their own information, and was called a "passbook" because it was used as a way to identify the account holder without needing further identification. It also regularly passed between the bank and the account holder for updating.

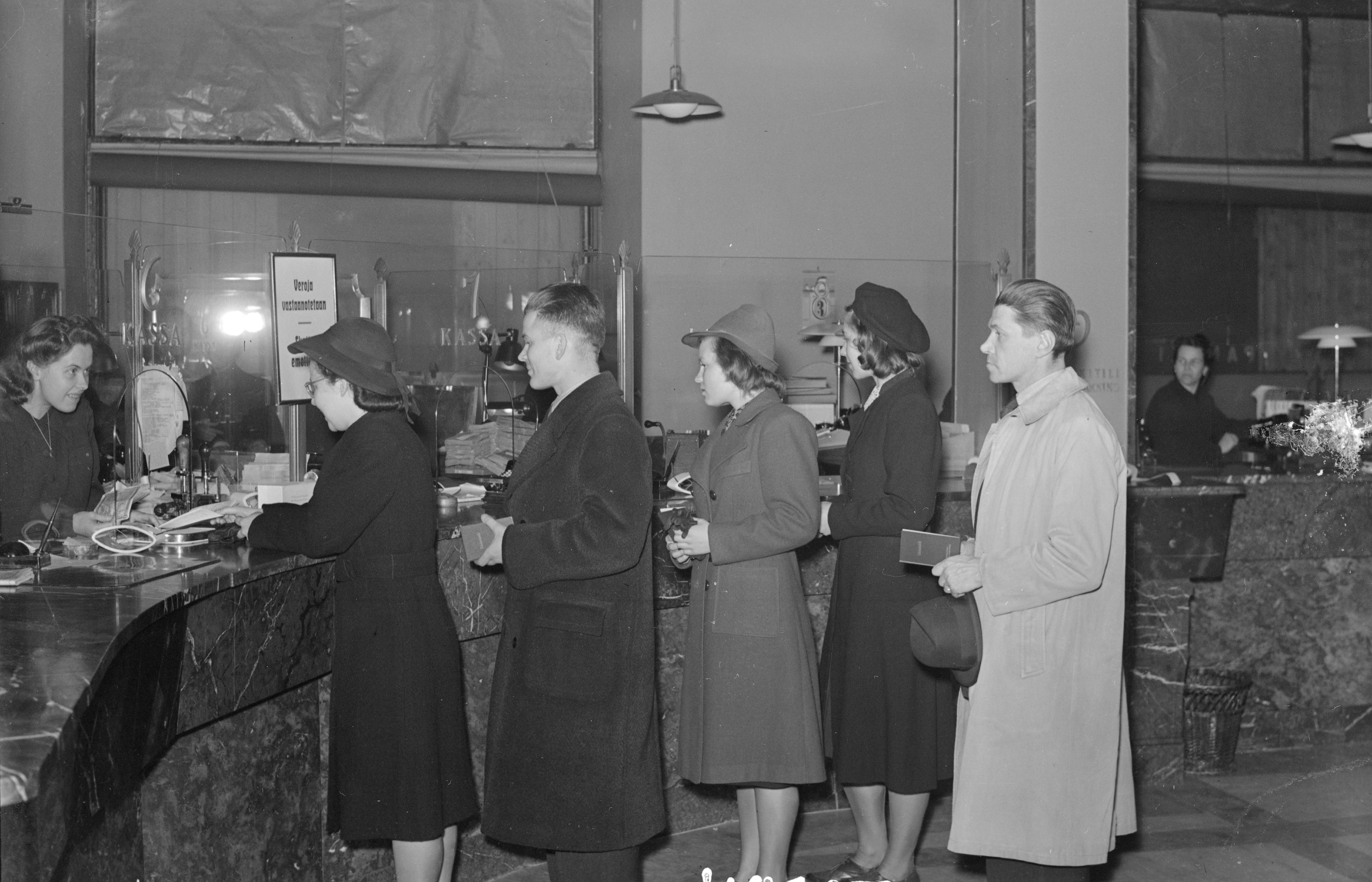
Customers queuing to bank counter in Finland with passbooks (1943)

== Usage ==
=== Credits and deposits ===
To add credit to an account by bringing cash to a bank in person, the account holder can fill a small credit slip or deposit slip. The total value of notes and coins is counted and entered on the slip, along with the date and the payer's name. The cash and details are counted and checked by the teller at the bank; if everything is in order, the deposit is credited to the account, the credit slip is then kept by the bank, and the credit slip booklet is stamped with the date and then returned to the account holder. An account holder uses his passbook to record their history of transactions with his bank.

=== Debits and withdrawals ===
Withdrawals normally required the account holder to visit the branch where the account was held, where a debit slip or withdrawal slip would be prepared and signed. If the teller did not know the account holder, the signature on the slip and the authorities would be checked against the signature card at the branch, before money was paid out. In the 1980s, banks adopted the black light signature system for passbooks, which enabled withdrawals to be made from passbooks at a branch other than the one where an account was opened, unless prior arrangements were made to transfer the signature card to the other branch. Under this system, the passbook's owner would sign in the back of the passbook in an invisible ink and the signing authorities would also be noted. At the paying branch, the signature on the withdrawal slip would be checked against the signature in the book, which required a special ultraviolet reader to read. Today, the customer is more commonly verified by PIN and commonly through an automated teller machine.

== Direct banking ==
For people who feel uneasy with telephone or online banking, the use of a passbook is an alternative to obtain, in real-time, the account activity without waiting for a bank statement. However, unlike some bank statements, some passbooks offer fewer details, replacing easy-to-understand descriptions with short codes.

Customers still visit their banks to manage their passbook accounts, but banks often keep electronic records of passbook histories and may print transactions directly in passbooks.

Despite the widespread adoption of online banking, passbook savings accounts remain a relatively popular option at the banks that provide them.

== Gallery of passbooks ==
Passbook gallery

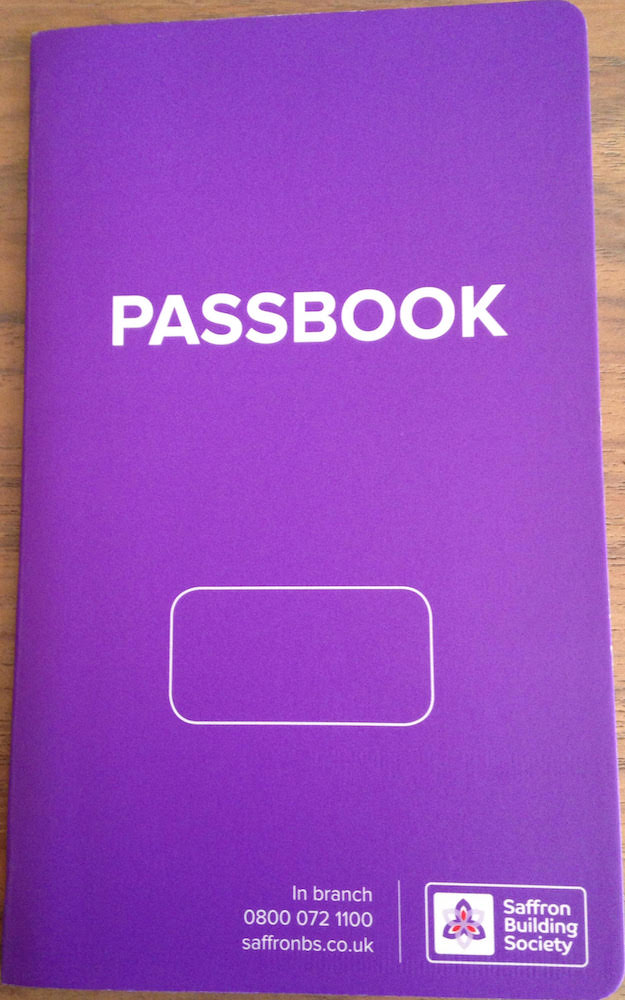
Saffron Building Society passbook

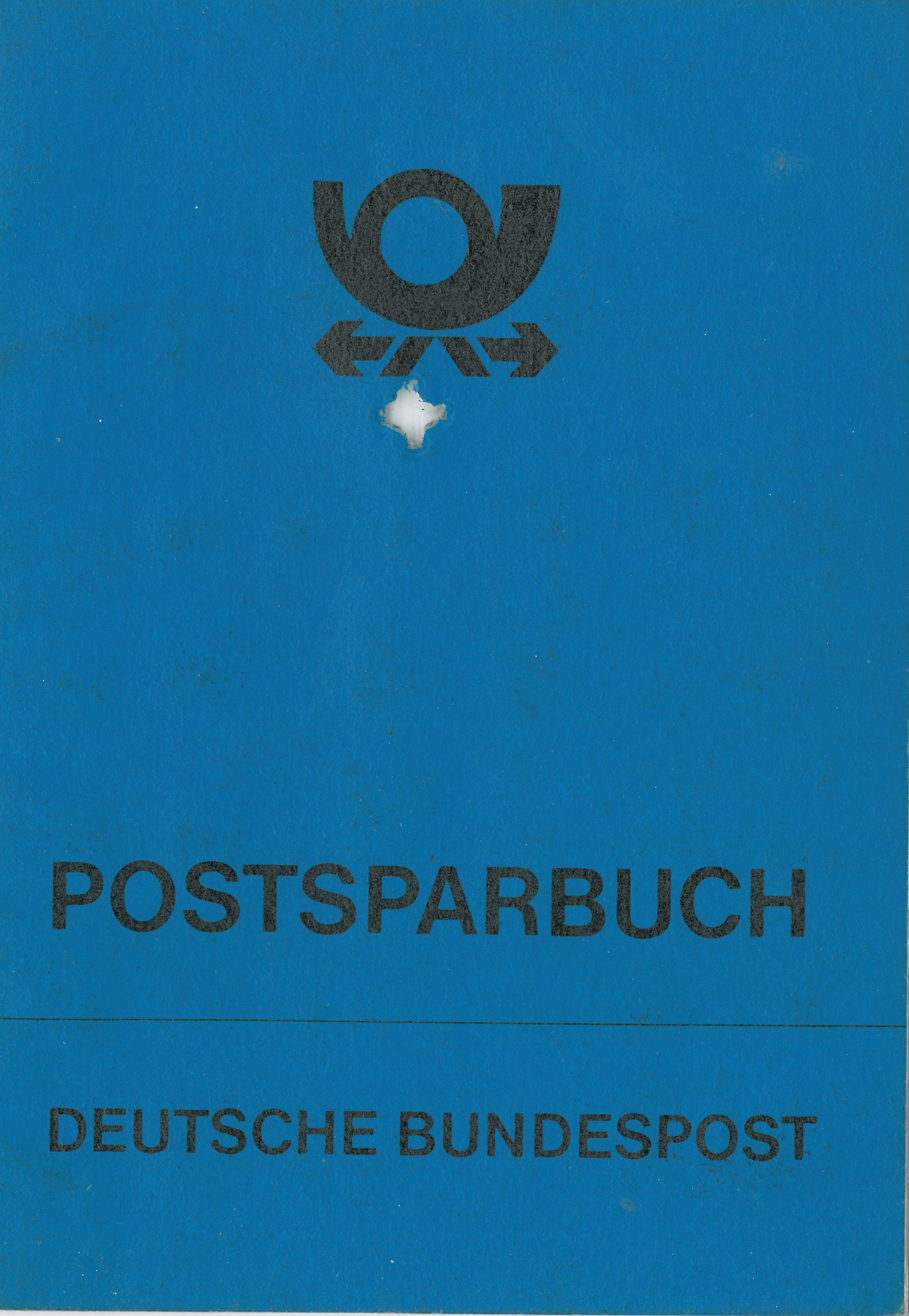
German Postsparbuch, cover

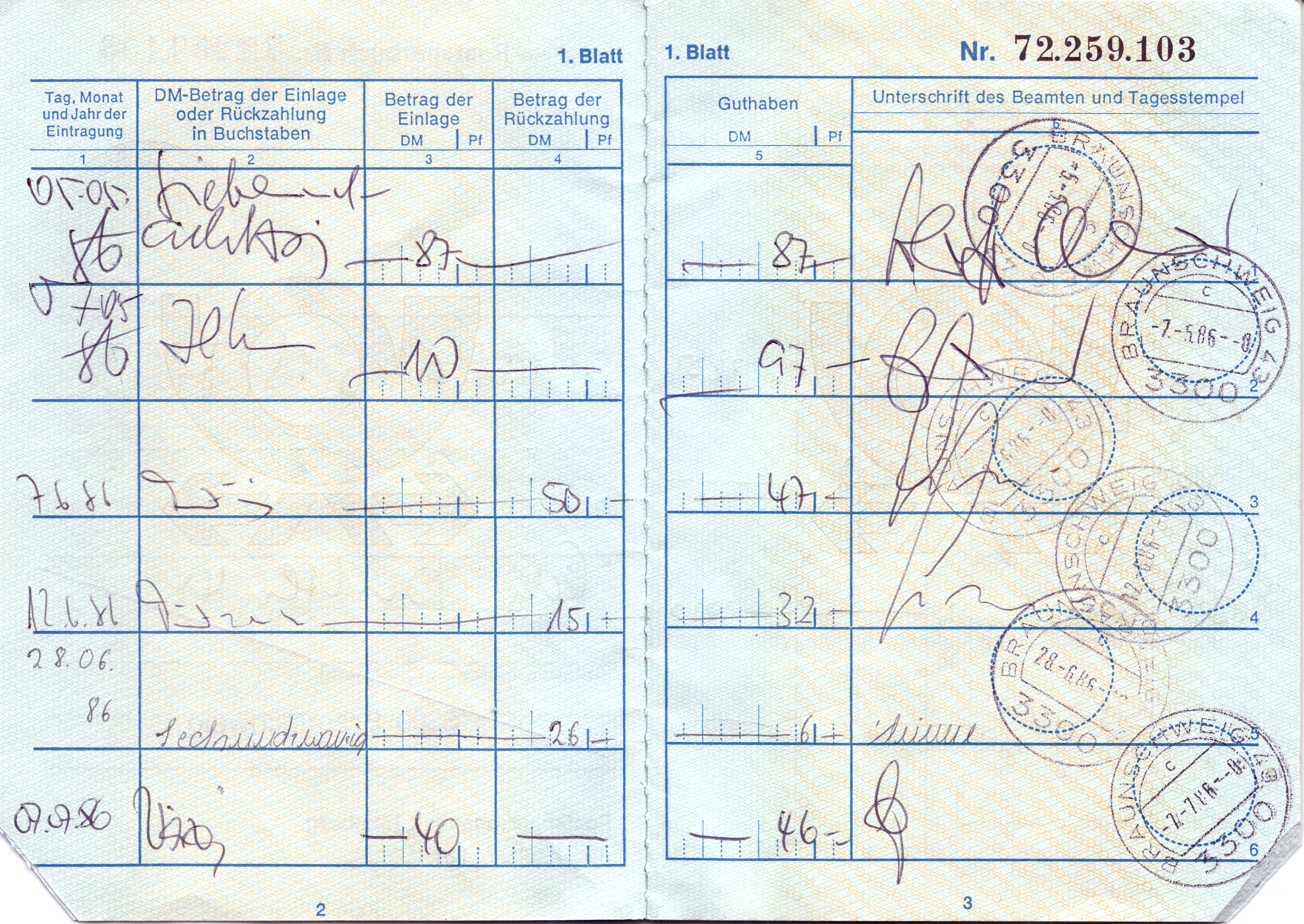
German Postsparbuch

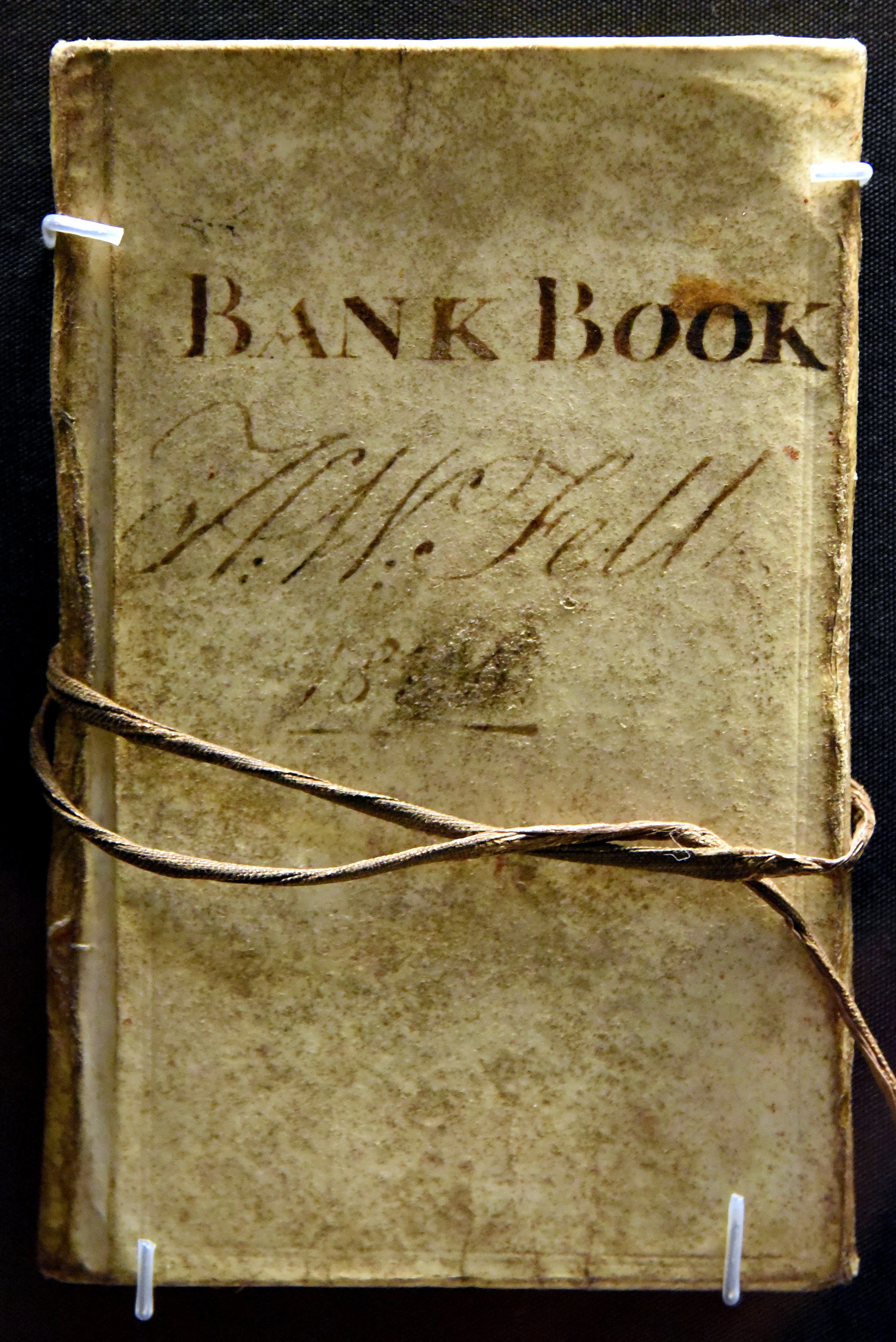
Bank account book, issued by Petty and Postlethwaite for use in Cumbria, UK. First entry 1831, last entry in 1870. On display at the British Museum in London.

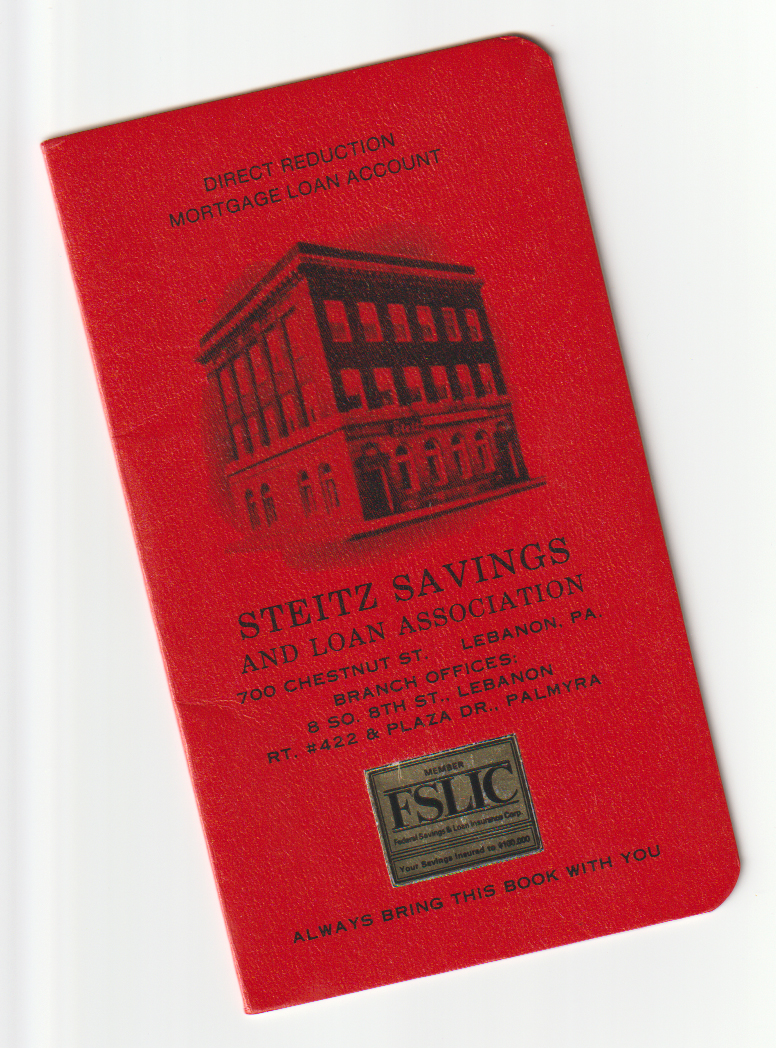
Steitz Savings and Loan Association Mortgage Loan Passbook (1987)

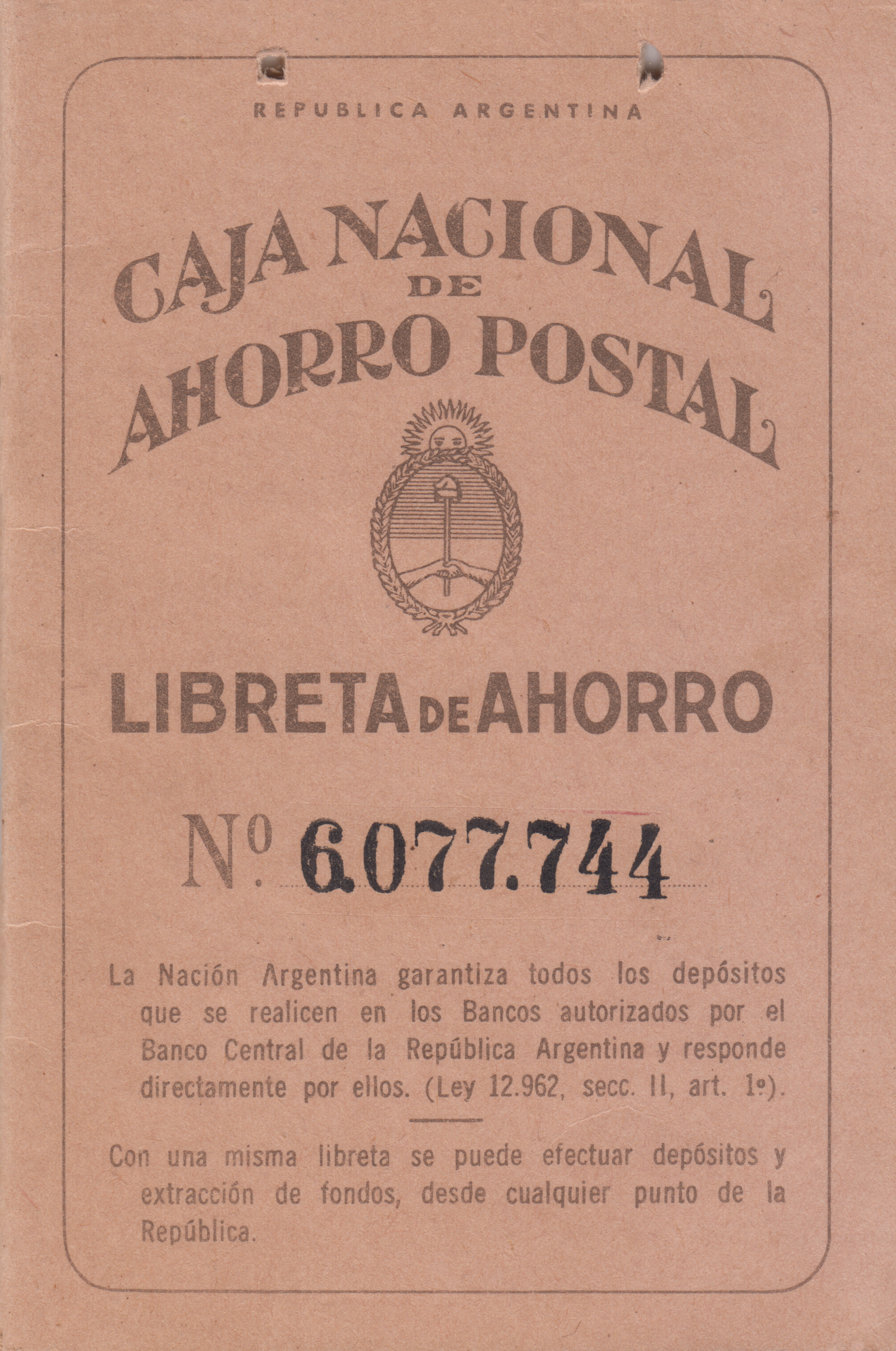
1946 Argentinian passbook cover.

100-ruble control stamps (1915–1916) in a postal savings passbook from Vishnevo, Russian Empire.

== See also ==
- Bank statement
- Cheque book
- Deposit account
