= Digital banking =

Banking services delivered over the Internet

UML class diagram depicting banking

Digital banking is part of the broader context for the move to online banking, where banking services are delivered over the internet. The shift from traditional to digital banking has been gradual, remains ongoing, and is constituted by differing degrees of banking service digitization. Digital banking involves high levels of process automation and web-based services and may include APIs enabling cross-institutional service composition to deliver banking products and provide transactions. It provides the ability for users to access financial data through desktop, mobile and ATM services.

== Description ==
A digital bank represents a virtual process that includes online banking, mobile banking, and beyond. As an end-to-end platform, digital banking must encompass the front end that consumers see, the back end that bankers see through their servers and admin control panels, and the middleware that connects these nodes. Ultimately, a digital bank should facilitate all functional levels of banking on all service delivery platforms. In other words, it should have all the same functions as a head office, branch office, online service, bank cards, ATMs, and point-of-sale (POS) machines.

Digital banking can involve more than customer-facing mobile or online banking platforms. It may also rely on middleware, application programming interfaces and back-end systems that connect core banking infrastructure with other applications. Digital systems may support functions such as risk management, product development, security and regulatory compliance.

== History of Digital Banking ==
The earliest forms of digital banking date back to the advent of ATMs and cards in the 1960s. As the internet emerged in the 1980s with early broadband, digital networks began to connect retailers with suppliers and consumers to develop needs for early online catalogs and inventory software systems.

By the 1990s, the Internet had become widely available and online banking started becoming the norm. The improvement of broadband and e-commerce systems in the early 2000s led to what resembles the modern digital banking world today. The proliferation of smartphones through the next decade opened the door for transactions on the go beyond ATM machines. Over 60% of consumers now use their smartphones as their preferred method for digital banking.

There is a demand for end-to-end consistency and for services, optimized for convenience and user experience. The market provides cross-platform front ends, enabling purchase decisions based on available technology such as mobile devices, or a desktop or Smart TV at home. In order for banks to meet consumer demands, they need to keep focusing on improving digital technology that provides agility, scalability and efficiency.

== What digital banking means for banks ==
A study conducted in 2015 revealed that 47% of bankers see the potential to improve customer relationships through digital banking, 44% see it as a means to generate competitive advantage, 32% see it as a channel for new customer acquisition. Only 16% emphasized the potential for cost saving.

The major benefits of digital banking are:

- Business efficiency - Not only do digital platforms improve interaction with customers and deliver their needs more quickly, they also provide methods for making internal functions more efficient. While banks have been at the forefront of digital technology at the consumer end for decades, they have not completely embraced all the benefits of middleware to accelerate productivity.
- Cost savings - One of the keys for banks to cut costs is automated applications that replace redundant manual labor. Traditional bank processing is costly, slow and prone to human error, according to McKinsey & Company. Relying on people and paper also takes up office space, which runs up energy and storage costs. In banking, CRM systems unify customer data to streamline services and support targeted financial offerings. Digital platforms can further reduce costs through the synergies of more qualitative data and a faster response to market changes.
- Increased accuracy - Traditional banks that rely mainly on paper processing can have an error rate of up to 40%, which requires reworking. Coupled with a lack of IT integration between branch and back office personnel, this problem reduces business efficiency. By simplifying the verification process, it's easier to implement IT solutions with business software, leading to more accurate accounting. Financial accuracy is crucial for banks to comply with government regulations.
- Improved competitiveness - Digital solutions help manage marketing lists, allowing banks to reach broader markets and engage with digitally active consumers. CRM platforms can track customer history and provide quick access to email and other forms of online communication. It's effective for executing customer rewards programs that can improve loyalty and satisfaction.
- Greater agility - The use of automation can speed up both external and internal processes, both of which can improve customer satisfaction. Following the collapse of financial markets in 2008, an increased emphasis was placed on risk management. Instead of banks hiring and training risk management professionals, risk management software can detect and respond to market changes more quickly than manual processes.
- Enhanced security - All businesses, big or small, face a growing number of cyber threats that can damage their reputations. In February 2016 the Internal Revenue Service announced it had been hacked the previous year, as did several big tech companies. Banks can benefit from extra layers of security to protect data.

== Back End Banking Architecture ==
A key way in which digital banks can gain a significant competitive edge is by developing a more robust IT architecture. By replacing manual back-office procedures with automated software solutions, banks can reduce employee errors and speed up processes. This paradigm shift can lead to smaller operational units and allow managers to concentrate on improving tasks that require human intervention.

Automation reduces the need for paper, which inevitably ends up taking up space that can be occupied with technology. By using software that accelerates productivity by up to 50%, banks can improve customer service since they will be able to resolve issues at a faster pace. One way a bank can improve its back end business efficiency is to divide hundreds of processes into three categories:

- full automated
- partially automated
- manual tasks

It still isn't practical to automate all operations for many financial firms, especially those that conduct financial reviews or provide investment advice. But the more a bank can replace cumbersome redundant manual tasks with automation, the more it can focus on issues that involve direct communication with customers. The obstacles currently preventing banks from investing in a more digital back end environment are:

- banks have traditionally prioritized launching new products that are still difficult to automate
- mergers and acquisitions, new products and government regulations have already established complex IT architectures that are difficult to revise
- IT teams do not always grasp business priorities
- many banks lack in-house IT expertise beyond traditional mainframe environments

== Digital Account Opening and Digital Lending ==
Digital account opening has become an important part of digital banking, though abandonment remains a challenge. Among surveyed U.S. financial institutions, digital channels accounted for 27% of checking account openings in 2025, while institutions reported an average of 3.36 abandoned digital checking applications for every completed online opening.

Digital banking also extends to lending. In a 2026 benchmark study, digital channels accounted for 51% of consumer loan applications among surveyed institutions, up from 41% the previous year.

== Direction Toward Digital Cash ==
Digital cash eliminates many problems associated with physical cash, such as misplacement or the potential for money to be stolen or damaged. Additionally, digital cash can be traced and accounted for more accurately in cases of dispute. As consumers find an increasing number of purchasing opportunities at their fingertips, there is less need to carry physical cash in their wallets.

Other indications that demand for digital cash is growing are highlighted by the use of peer-to-peer payment systems such as PayPal and the rise of untraceable cryptocurrencies such as bitcoin. Almost anything imaginable that can be paid with physical cash can theoretically be paid with the swipe of a bank card, including parking meters. The problem is this technology is still not omnipresent. Cash circulation grew in the United States by 42% between 2007 and 2012, with an average annual growth rate of 7%, according to the BBC.

The concept of an all-digital cash economy remains possible in theory but physical cash is unlikely to disappear in the near future. All digital banks are possible as a consumer option, but people may still have a need for physical cash in certain situations. ATMs help banks cut overhead, especially if they are available at various strategic locations beyond branch offices.

== Emerging Digital Solutions ==
Emerging forms of digital banking are:

- BaaS - Banking as a Service (allows for third party integration)
- BaaP - Banking as a Platform (for integrating core systems with software)
- Cloud-based Infrastructure (allows less reliance on IT staff)
- White Label Banking (such as co-branded credit cards)

These solutions build on enhanced technical architectures as well as different business models.

== See also ==
- Neobank
- Challenger bank
- Open Banking
- Open Finance
