= Noda (company) =

Global open banking platform

- Industry: Fintech
- Founded: February 2020; 6 years ago in London, UK
- Headquarters: Nicosia, Cyprus
- Services: End-user KYC, Payment processing, Lifetime Value forecasting, User Experience optimization, Open Banking API, Card Payments, No-code Payment Page, Instant Payment Links, QR In-Store Payments
- Number of employees: 100+
- Website: https://noda.live/

Noda is a global open banking platform founded in February 2020 in London, United Kingdom. In June 2026, the company relocated its headquarters to Nicosia, Cyprus. The company specializes in optimizing online merchant operations. The platform has partnerships with 2000+ banks in 28 countries and over 30,000 bank branches worldwide.

== History ==
Noda was founded in February 2020 in London, UK. The following year, in April 2021, the company launched the beta version of its open banking payments. In July 2022, Noda connected a majority of the EU and UK banks. In October 2022, B2C payments were launched. In February 2023, Noda partnered with Wargaming, a multi-platform game publisher, to launch instant open banking payments for their games. This collaboration introduced several online payment methods, including account-to-account (A2A) transactions.

On October 4, 2023, Noda formed a partnership with Tickets Travel Network, a travel distribution company in the EMEA region. In December 2023, new services including AIS Data Services and AI-generated Payment Links were launched. In February 2024, Noda introduced identity verification and advanced antifraud measures.

By May 2024 it expanded its operations to Canada, Australia, and Brazil, establishing companies in the countries. In late 2024, Noda introduced its Pay & Go orchestration platform, aimed at simplifying registration, Know Your Customer (KYC) processes, and payment handling for businesses and their customers. The company also expanded its presence in the European fintech sector and was listed in Finance Malta’s business directory as part of its growing operations in Malta.

In January 2025, Noda launched AI-powered payment pages tailored for content creators and small to medium-sized enterprises (SMEs) to create customized payment interfaces without advanced technical knowledge.

In March 2025, Noda introduced a QR code payment service for offline businesses in the United Kingdom, enabling merchants to accept account-to-account payments without the need for traditional card terminals.

In April 2025, the company registered its trademark in the European Union to enhance brand protection across member states.

In June 2025, Noda partnered with Lithuanian invoicing platform Invoice123 to expand its real-time payment services for small businesses. At the same time, the company also launched Noda Prime, a solution designed to support streamers in receiving donations with lower fees and improved audience interaction.

== Activities ==
Noda offers an open banking API for online businesses to integrate direct bank payments, focusing on merchant services like KYC, payment processing, Lifetime Value forecasting, and UX optimization. Its key markets are the EU, the UK, Canada, Australia, and Brazil.

It partners with 2000+ banks across 28 countries, accessing over 30,000 bank branches worldwide.

Noda operates through ten legal entities in Latvia, Poland, Lithuania, Malta, Cyprus, Spain, Brazil, Australia, and Canada. The company is headquartered in Nicosia, Cyprus, where Noda Holding Limited (HE 428729) is registered.
