= ClearScore =

British financial technology company

- Type: Private
- Industry: Financial technology
- Founded: 1 July 2015; 11 years ago
- Founder: Justin Basini; Nigel Morris; Dan Cobley
- Headquarters: London, United Kingdom
- Key people: Justin Basini (CEO)
- Products: Credit scores; Credit reports; Credit monitoring; Dark web monitoring
- Revenue: £100 million (2022)
- Owners: QED Investors, Lead Edge Capital, and Invus Opportunities.
- Number of employees: 450 (2024)
- Website: clearscore.com

ClearScore is a British financial technology company that provides credit scores, reports and affordability scores for individuals. It also operates a marketplace in which users can find credit cards, loans and car finance, earning commission from the financial services providers it refers clients to.

The company was founded in July 2015 by Justin Basini, Nigel Morris and Dan Cobley. It later expanded to include affordability assessment, using current account spending patterns via Open Banking. As of 2024, the company had over 20 million users and operated in the United Kingdom, South Africa, Australia, New Zealand, and Canada.

== History ==
ClearScore launched on 15 July 2015, offering credit scores and reports. It added credit card offers later that month and personal loan offers in September. In December 2015 it launched a credit checking-app.

In July 2016 the company added a credit history feature called Timeline. It added car finance offers in November 2016, and in February 2017 launched a chatbot intended to help users improve their credit.

ClearScore launched in South Africa in June 2017, India in August 2018, Australia in February 2020 and Canada in September 2022. The India operation closed in 2020.

In March 2018, Experian announced plans to acquire ClearScore for £275 million ($366 million). The acquisition was abandoned in February 2019 after the Competition and Markets Authority indicated it considered that the acquisition would reduce competition in the UK market.

In September 2018, the Advertising Standards Authority received 35 complaints that a ClearScore TV advert, aired in June, trivialised domestic violence. The ad was cleared by the ASA.

In April 2020 the company launched a dark web monitoring service called ClearScore Protect. In 2021 it launched a second app, DriveScore, which uses telematics to give drivers data on their driving so they can opt to share it for reduced insurance costs.

In 2022, the company acquired Money Dashboard, a provider of open banking technology, and opened a technology and data science hub in Edinburgh. In 2023, the it announced a partnership with illion in Australia, under which illion's former Credit Simple users would be able to continue accessing their credit scores and reports through the ClearScore app.

In April 2026, ClearScore announced it would create a second global hub for the company, in Cape Town, South Africa. Cape Town is recognized as a global tech hub, and as Africa's tech hub. ClearScore opened its first office outside the UK in Cape Town in 2017, and as part of the 2026 announcement, the company said it expected to grow its team in the city to around 120 people.

== Products and services ==
ClearScore provides credit scores and credit reports from credit bureaus Equifax (in the UK) and Experian (in South Africa and Australia). Most of its services are free to consumers.

ClearScore Protect provides dark web monitoring for users. The company's Affordability Score is intended as guidance on how much a user can afford to borrow.
