= The Berlin Group =

The Berlin Group is a pan-European payments interoperability and standardisation initiative that develops technical standards for interbank communication and application programming interfaces (APIs) in the European financial sector. It is best known for the NextGenPSD2 framework, an API specification widely used in the implementation of open banking under the European Union's revised Payment Services Directive (PSD2).

The Berlin Group has been identified in international policy, academic, and industry analyses as a key market-led standardisation initiative within the European open-banking ecosystem. A World Bank report on open finance governance describes NextGenPSD2 as the main industry-driven API standardisation initiative in Europe, developed by the Berlin Group as a consortium of banks and payment service providers. Academic analysis in the European Journal of Risk Regulation likewise identifies NextGenPSD2 as one of the most commonly used API standards in the European PSD2 landscape and discusses its role in interoperability and market fragmentation. Policy and economic studies by the International Monetary Fund and the European Commission similarly refer to Berlin Group standards as part of the European implementation of open banking under PSD2.

In industry analysis, McKinsey & Company describes the Berlin Group as a consortium developing a common API standard (NextGenPSD2) within the European Union's open-banking framework, while Strategy& / PwC identifies market-led standards such as the Berlin Group as mechanisms supporting interoperability in digitally transforming financial services.

In comparative policy and academic literature, the Berlin Group is discussed alongside other European API initiatives, including STET, PolishAPI, and the United Kingdom's Open Banking Implementation Entity (OBIE), as part of a broader multi-standard landscape of open banking in Europe.

== History ==
The Berlin Group originated as a European payments interoperability initiative in 2004. It brought together banks, payment service providers, and industry associations to develop scheme-independent technical standards for interbank communication.

Following the adoption of PSD2, account-servicing payment service providers were required to enable regulated third-party access to payment accounts under conditions defined by European law. The implementation of these requirements led to the development of application programming interfaces to support secure and standardised access. In the absence of a single mandated API standard, multiple industry-led initiatives developed specifications for PSD2 access.

The Berlin Group's NextGenPSD2 framework is identified by the European Commission and the Joint Research Centre as one of the standards developed in this context.

== Governance ==
The Berlin Group operates as an industry-led collaboration. Under PSD2, regulators established requirements for secure access to payment accounts but did not mandate a single API standard across the European Union. This approach allowed market participants to develop standardisation initiatives independently.

Comparative studies of open banking frameworks describe differences between this model and the United Kingdom's approach. In the UK, the Open Banking Implementation Entity (OBIE) was established under a regulatory mandate and developed a centrally specified standard for major banks. By contrast, European API standards such as those developed by the Berlin Group emerged through voluntary industry coordination.

Policy analyses by the European Commission and the BIS describe the resulting European landscape as one in which multiple standards coexist, which can increase implementation complexity for cross-border services.

== NextGenPSD2 ==
The Berlin Group's primary technical deliverable is the NextGenPSD2 framework, an API specification for access to account (XS2A) services under PSD2. It defines interfaces for the main categories of regulated services associated with open banking.

These include:

- Account Information Services (AIS), which provide access to account balances and transaction data.
- Payment Initiation Services (PIS), which enable third parties to initiate payments.
- Confirmation of Availability of Funds (CAF), which allows verification of available funds.

The framework defines a standardised structure for implementing PSD2 access interfaces.

== Technical architecture ==
Diagram of an open banking interaction under PSD2, showing communication between a payment service user (PSU), a third-party provider (TPP), and an account-servicing payment service provider (ASPSP) via an API (XS2A), including authentication (SCA) and consent management.

NextGenPSD2 is generally described as a RESTful API framework using standard web technologies for communication between account-servicing payment service providers (ASPSPs) and third-party providers (TPPs). It defines structured interfaces exposing resources such as accounts, balances, transactions, consents, and payment orders.

The European Payments Council describes PSD2-based API interactions as involving a third-party provider requesting access to a service, authentication of the payment service user, and the execution of the request through a secure interface.

The legal framework for such interactions is defined by PSD2 and the Regulatory Technical Standards on strong customer authentication and secure communication. The European Banking Authority has issued guidance on these requirements, including authentication, consent management, and communication standards.

== Role in open banking ==
The BIS and De Pascalis and Stasi discuss the Berlin Group as part of the development of API-based access to financial data. The BIS describes open banking as a transition toward standardised API-based architectures, while the European Commission reports that multiple API standards have emerged in the EU under PSD2.

The European Commission identifies the Berlin Group's framework as one of the standards used in the implementation of PSD2 interfaces, particularly in Germany. Comparative studies note that this reflects a broader European approach based on multiple coexisting standards rather than a single mandated specification.

McKinsey and Strategy& / PwC refer to the Berlin Group in the context of open financial data and API-based service models.

== Comparison with other standards ==
The European Commission and the Joint Research Centre identify several API standardisation initiatives developed under PSD2.

These include:

- STET, developed in France.
- PolishAPI, developed in Poland.
- The UK's OBIE standard.

The European Commission describes this landscape as involving multiple coexisting standards without a single harmonised framework.

== Adoption ==
The European Commission reports that the Berlin Group framework has been used by banks and payment service providers in multiple European jurisdictions, while other standards have been adopted in different jurisdictions, including STET in France and PolishAPI in Poland.

== Open Finance API Framework ==
In 2020, the Berlin Group introduced an Open Finance API Framework intended to extend data-sharing models beyond PSD2-regulated payment accounts.

The European Commission refers to existing PSD2 API frameworks in discussions of potential developments toward open finance, in which broader categories of financial data may be shared through standardised interfaces. The OECD and ECB have also discussed the evolution of open banking infrastructures toward wider data-sharing models.

== Criticism ==
The European Commission and the BIS describe the European open banking environment as characterised by multiple API standards, which can contribute to fragmentation and increased complexity for cross-border service providers. The European Commission also reports variation in implementation across institutions, even where similar standards are used.

Comparative studies contrast this with the United Kingdom's more centralised model, which is described as providing greater uniformity through a single standard.
