= Banco BV (Brazil) =

Brazilian banking corporation

banco BV
- Type: Private
- Industry: Banking
- Founded: 1988; 38 years ago
- Headquarters: São Paulo, Brazil,
- Key people: Gustavo Sousa, (CEO)
- Products: Financial services
- Revenue: ▲US$6.0 billion (2013)
- Net income: ▼ – US$216.6 million (2013)
- Total assets: ▼US$44.6 billion (2013)
- Number of employees: 5,052
- Parent: Votorantim Group; Banco do Brasil
- Website: bv.com.br

Banco BV is the seventh largest bank in Brazil. It operates in the wholesale, retail, treasury, asset management and brokerage fields, and was founded in 1988. Its headquarters are located in São Paulo, Brazil.

The operations of banco BV is driven by a set of institutions that operate in an integrated way: the Bank provides businesses products and services for the commercial sector and investment, the BV Financeira operates in the financing and consumer credit; Votorantim Asset Management (VAM) manages the resources of others, and Vototrantim CVTM makes securities and brokerage.

The bank its owned by Votorantim Group and the Banco do Brasil, the operation was completed on 28 September 2009. Banco do Brasil then hold 49.9% of common shares and 50.1% of the preferred, Banco BV continuing control of the Votorantim Group. banco BV shut down its brokerage arm in 2024, and transferred its clients to Banco Bradesco's brokerage service Agora Securities, as part of a joint venture integration.

== "Bank as a Service" ==
Banco BV started in the Bank as a Service segment in January 2022, when it made a capital contribution to S3 Bank ("Banking as a Service" (BaaS) platform, which offers integrated financial and payment solutions for modular way), becoming a minority shareholder of this fintech, and boosting the presence of banco BV in this segment, which has gained the attention of traditional banks.

In August 2022, after the financial contribution from Banco BV, S3 Bank started a new partnership. It implemented its products with the solar kit distributor Genyx Solar Power and created Banco Genyx, a digital bank focused on the solar energy segment. The partnership was made public during Intersolar South America 2022 (South America's largest fair for the solar sector).
