= Reconciliation (accounting) =

Accounting term

In accounting, reconciliation is the process of ensuring that two sets of records (usually the balances of two accounts) are in agreement. It is a general practice for businesses to create their balance sheet at the end of the financial year as it denotes the state of finances for that period. Reconciliation is used to ensure that the money leaving an account matches the actual money spent. This is done by making sure the balances match at the end of a particular accounting period.

== Definition ==
The following two definitions are given by the Oxford Dictionary of Accounting.

i) "A procedure for confirming that the balance in a chequebook matches the corresponding bank statement. This is normally done by preparing a bank reconciliation statement.

ii) A procedure for confirming the reliability of a company's accounting records by regularly comparing [balances of transactions]. An account reconciliation may be prepared on a daily, monthly, or annual basis."

The generally accepted accounting principles (GAAP) are a set of accounting principles, procedures and standards that organisations use in order to compile their financial statements. GAAP states that the purpose of account reconciliation is to provide accuracy and consistency in financial accounts. To ensure all cash outlays and inlays match between cashflow statements and income statements it is necessary to carry out reconciliation accounts.

Reconciliation is a process that may benefit businesses as this may help avoid balance sheet errors which may have led to detrimental ramifications; in addition, reconciliation may help against fraud and can help instill financial integrity.

Accounting software is one of a number of tools that organizations use to carry out this process thus eliminating errors and therefore making accurate decisions based on the financial information. Reconciliation of accounts determines whether transactions are in the correct place or should be shifted into a different account.

Reconciliation in accounting is not only important for businesses, but may also be convenient for households and individuals. It is prudent to reconcile credit card accounts and checkbooks on a regular basis, for example. This is done by comparing debit card receipts or check copies with a person's bank statements.

Benefits of reconciling:

- To mitigate the mistakes made by financial institutions or fraudulent withdraws from an account, if any.
- To help create an overall image on spending and assess if a person is overspending on fees.

Account reconciliation is an important internal control in the financial reporting process. Public companies are required to perform these steps as a part of their financial close.

== Methods ==
To ensure the reliability of the financial records, reconciliations must, therefore, be performed for all balance sheet accounts on a regular and ongoing basis. A robust reconciliation process improves the accuracy of the financial reporting function and allows the finance department to publish financial reports with confidence.

There are two ways in which reconciliation can take place:

1. Using a documentation review, "Document review is a formalised technique of data collection involving the examination of existing records or documents." This is the most common approach of account reconciliation. This method is done by using accounting software.
2. The second method used is analytics review. "Any process by which a person or company looks at an account or financial statement and attempts to identify any irregularities. This may involve comparing financial and non-financial information." Reconciliation of accounts using this method is undertaken by estimating the transactions that should be in an account, usually based on other data, for example historical activity.

In both cases where mistakes are identified as a result of the reconciliation, adjustments should be undertaken in order for the account balance to match the supporting information.

Discrepancies identified during reconciliation may also be recorded as reconciling items or exceptions. These can arise from timing differences, missing or duplicate transactions, fees, interest or errors. They typically need to be investigated before any adjustment is made.

== Current practice ==
Currently there are no specific account standards for accountancy reconciliation per se. However, there are different rules for balancing many types of accounts. There are no specific regulations mentioned by IAS, ICAW and HMRC. GAAP provide different rules in regards to reconciliation to balance different types of accounts. According to GAAP, account reconciliation is a process that is performed through account conversion or double-entry accounting.

== Manual reconciliation to automation ==
In the United States, the passage in 2002 of the Sarbanes–Oxley Act (SOX) has emphasized the need for balance sheet account reconciliation to be included within a company's own procedures, not relying only on external auditors. The legislation was enacted "to protect shareholders and general public from accounting errors and fraudulent practices in the enterprise, as well as improve the accuracy of corporate disclosures." SOX and other similar acts across the world have increased stress on organisations to comply. As a result, the accounting industry has sought ways to automate a previously strenuous manual process. The pressure of SOX is coupled with the perennial need to mitigate erroneous reconciliation in the process.

By using available information technology, organizations can more easily automate their reconciliation and for each financial close cycle less manual labour would be required. As late as 2012, 90% of companies still reconciled manually, using Microsoft Excel spreadsheets. This process is arduous allowing for further human error. Automating reconciliation can significantly reduce aforementioned errors and increase efficiency. Further benefits of automated reconciliation include centralised control, improved monitoring, reduced operational costs, increased productivity and efficiency, improved accessibility, improved data security and reduced audit risks and costs.

== In banking ==
In bookkeeping, bank reconciliation is the process by which the bank account balance in an entity’s books of account is reconciled to the balance reported by the financial institution in the most recent bank statement. Any difference between the two figures needs to be examined and, if appropriate, rectified.

Bank statements are commonly routinely produced by the financial institution and used by account holders to perform their bank reconciliations. To assist in reconciliations, many financial institutions now also offer direct downloads of financial transaction information into the account holders accounting software, typically using the .csv file format.

Differences between an entity’s books of account and the bank’s records may arise, for mainly three reasons, they are as follows:

1. Difference due to timing in recording entries.
2. Transactions being recorded by the bank but not by the account holder.
3. Errors in recording entries.

Sometimes, it may be easy to reconcile the difference by looking at the transactions in the bank statement since the last reconciliation and the entity's own accounting records (cash book) to see if some combination of them tally with the difference to be explained. Otherwise it may be necessary to go through and match every transaction in both sets of records since the last reconciliation, and identify which transactions remain unmatched. The necessary adjustments should then be made in the cash book, or reported to the bank if necessary, or any timing differences recorded to assist with future reconciliations.

For this reason, and to minimise the amount of work involved, it is good practice to reconcile at reasonably frequent intervals.

=== Bank reconciliation statement ===
A bank reconciliation statement is a statement prepared by the entity as part of the reconciliation process which sets out the entries which have caused the difference between the two balances. For example, it would list outstanding cheques (ie., issued cheques that have still not been presented at the bank for payment).

The entries in the entity’s books to rectify the discovered discrepancies (except for the outstanding cheques) would typically be made in a subsequent date or period, not backdated. When cheques become stale (ie., out of date), they would typically be reversed, not cancelled.

== See also ==
- Bank reconciliation
- Intercompany accounting
