= Intercompany accounting =

Intercompany accounting is the accounting process when transactions occur between two business entities with common ownership. Companies with common ownership include parent companies and subsidiary companies. Intercompany transactions arise when business transactions occur between entities that are not independent since control of both is held by the same owners. Intercompany accounts are used to isolate these internal transactions so they may be eliminated when producing financial reports. Financial reporting should only include business activity with external customers and suppliers. Consolidation accounting is a subset of intercompany accounting where the impact of related company transactions is eliminated from financial reports.

== See also ==
- Reconciliation (accounting)
