= Open finance =

Financial data concept and practice

Open finance is a concept and practice within the financial services industry that involves the secure sharing of financial data with third-party service providers through Application Programming Interfaces (APIs). Building upon the principles of open banking, which focuses primarily on banking data, open finance aims to give consumers and businesses greater control over their financial data, enabling them to access a wider range of financial products and services. This includes sharing data beyond traditional banking, encompassing areas like investments, pensions, mortgages, and insurance.

Open finance allows consumers to grant authorized third-party providers access to their financial information, enabling these providers to develop applications and services that can help consumers manage their finances more effectively, compare financial products, and access personalized financial advice.

Open finance has the potential to increase competition and innovation in the financial services industry by fostering a more interconnected and consumer-centric marketplace. However, it also raises important considerations regarding data privacy and security, which necessitate robust regulatory frameworks and security measures to protect consumer data.

== History and evolution ==
Open finance emerged as a response to the inherent limitations of traditional financial data management, where information was typically isolated within individual banks and institutions. This fragmentation of data created significant challenges for consumers seeking to manage their finances holistically and access a wider range of financial products and services.

Early attempts to address these limitations often involved screen scraping techniques, where third-party applications extracted data from bank websites. However, screen scraping proved to be unreliable and raised security concerns due to its reliance on parsing website data that was not designed for programmatic access.

The development of open banking initiatives marked a significant step towards addressing these challenges. In 2015, the European Union adopted the revised Payment Services Directive 2 (PSD2), which came into effect in 2018. PSD2 established a legal framework for secure data sharing within the banking sector, requiring banks to provide authorized third-party providers access to customer account information, with customer consent. This development laid the foundation for the broader concept of open finance, which seeks to extend these principles beyond banking to encompass a wider range of financial services, including insurance, investments, and pensions.

Several factors contributed to the rise of open finance. Consumers increasingly sought access to financial products and services beyond those offered by their primary banks but often faced limitations in doing so. This restricted access hindered their ability to compare and choose the most suitable options. Moreover, the limited access to financial data created barriers to innovation within the financial services industry, hindering the ability of fintech companies to develop new products and services. Furthermore, a growing emphasis on consumer data ownership and control led to increased demands for transparency and access to personal financial information.

== Key principles and concepts ==
Open finance operates on a set of core principles and employs key concepts that are fundamental to its functionality and aims. These principles and concepts provide the framework for the secure, efficient, and ethical exchange of financial data between consumers, third-party providers, and financial institutions.

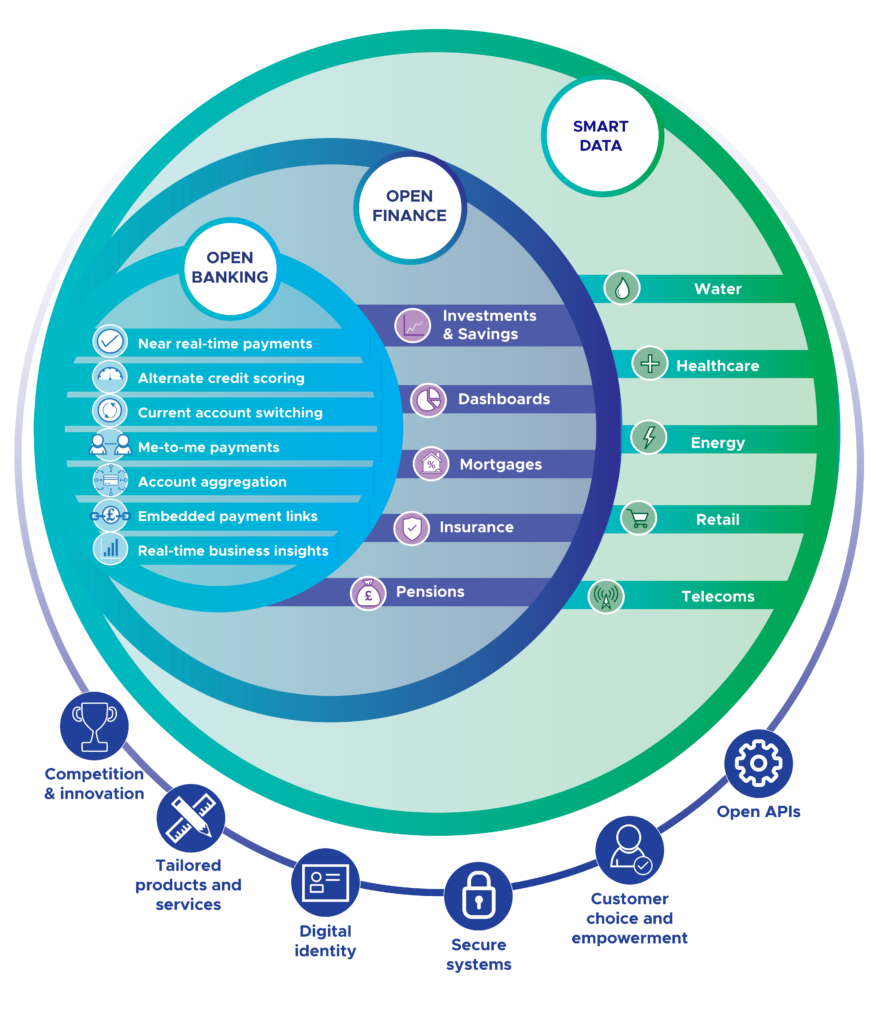
A diagram demonstrating the evolution from open banking and finance to open data

Central to open finance is the principle of consumer consent and control. Consumers have the right to determine how their financial data is used and shared, and any sharing of data requires their explicit and informed consent. This consent is typically granular, allowing consumers to choose precisely what data they are willing to share, and it remains revocable at any time. This emphasis on consumer control empowers individuals to manage their financial data and make informed decisions about its use.

Application Programming Interfaces (APIs) serve as the technological foundation of open finance. Standardized APIs are important to ensure interoperability between different platforms and systems, allowing seamless and secure data exchange. This standardization facilitates the development of an ecosystem of applications and services.

The concept of data portability is another key element. Consumers have the right to access and transfer their financial data between different providers. This portability empowers consumers to switch providers more easily.

Interoperability, which refers to the ability of different systems and platforms to communicate and exchange data seamlessly, is essential for the smooth functioning of the open finance ecosystem. It enables various applications and services to interact and share information, giving a more integrated and efficient financial landscape.

Transparency and accountability are also fundamental principles. Open finance promotes transparency by providing consumers with clear and accessible information about how their data is being used. Providers are held accountable for the responsible use of consumer data and must adhere to relevant regulations and ethical guidelines.

Open finance aims to broaden financial inclusion by providing underserved populations with improved access to financial services. This can be achieved through the development of products and services tailored to their specific needs. Examples include micro-loans, personalized financial management tools, and alternative credit scoring mechanisms that leverage a wider range of data sources.

== Global regulatory landscape ==
The adoption and implementation of open finance are progressing at different paces worldwide, with various regulatory approaches emerging. While some jurisdictions have established comprehensive legal frameworks, others are taking a more phased or voluntary approach.

Because open finance frameworks are developing at different speeds across jurisdictions, implementation differs in scope, consumer protections, technical standards, and regulatory timelines. Comparative research from organisations such as the OECD has highlighted varying approaches to data portability and financial data sharing across markets.

=== Regional approaches ===
==== Asia-Pacific ====
In Japan, the revised Banking Act, which came into effect in June 2018, mandates that banks implement open APIs, although the approach is voluntary. Banks have the freedom to adopt open banking practices but must adhere to specific rules and guidelines if they choose to do so. The Japanese Bankers Association has designed a framework that sets broad principles for data exchange, allowing banks and third-party providers to negotiate and contract bilaterally. This approach balances regulatory oversight with flexibility for industry participants.

Australia has taken a more proactive approach with the implementation of the Consumer Data Right (CDR) in July 2020. The CDR is a comprehensive open data reform that extends beyond banking to encompass financial data (open finance), energy, and telecommunications. It empowers consumers and small businesses by granting them greater control over their data and enabling them to securely share it with accredited third-party providers. The CDR fosters competition in the financial sector by enabling consumers to access better rates and customized services. Implementation of the CDR has been phased, starting with transaction data for credit and bank accounts and gradually expanding to include personal data, real estate, pensions, corporate finance, and investments.

Hong Kong has adopted a voluntary approach to open banking, with the Hong Kong Monetary Authority (HKMA) encouraging the use of open APIs in the banking industry. The HKMA's Open API Framework recommends minimum security standards and architecture, but banks have the flexibility to choose their implementation methods. This approach aims to foster innovation and improve customer experience through collaboration between banks and technology companies.

Singapore has taken an industry-collaborative approach, with the Monetary Authority of Singapore (MAS) actively driving industry standards and frameworks. MAS has introduced an API registry and the API Exchange (APIX), an open architecture platform to promote innovation. Financial institutions can enter bilateral agreements with third-party providers, establishing conditions based on their risk assessments.

==== North America ====
Canada initiated its open finance efforts in 2018 with a phased implementation of an open finance framework. The first phase is expected to include a wide range of consumer and SME accounts, including checking, savings, credit cards, and brokerage accounts, with payment initiation incorporated in later phases. The government has appointed an open banking lead to collaborate with financial institutions and fintechs to design and implement the framework. Working groups have been established to address critical aspects such as privacy, security, third-party accreditation, and liability. This collaborative approach aims to create a secure and inclusive open finance ecosystem in Canada.

Mexico was the first country in the LAC region to issue regulations for financial data sharing through APIs. The country's fintech law, passed in 2018, laid the groundwork for open finance, and in 2020, the National Banking and Securities Commission published comprehensive rules for APIs. Open finance in Mexico is being implemented in phases, with a focus on financial inclusion and the standardization of data exchange processes.

==== European Union (EU) and the United Kingdom ====
The European Union (EU) and the United Kingdom (UK) have emerged as pioneers in the development and implementation of open banking and open finance frameworks. Although the UK is no longer a member of the EU, both jurisdictions share a common origin in their approach to open finance, stemming from their initial adoption of the General Data Protection Regulation (GDPR) and the revised Payment Services Directive (PSD2). These foundational regulations established a framework for data privacy, consumer control, and secure data sharing practices within the banking sector.

In the EU, ongoing efforts aim to establish a comprehensive regulatory framework for open finance that extends beyond banking to encompass a wider range of financial services, including insurance, investments, and pensions. This framework seeks to ensure secure and consensual data sharing practices, mirroring the core principles of open banking of protecting consumer data privacy, fostering innovation, promoting competition, and enhancing transparency. The European Commission's proposed Financial Data Access (FIDA) regulation, published in June 2023, outlines rules for accessing, sharing, and using customer data in financial services. FIDA seeks to give customers greater control over their data while fostering innovation and competition within the financial sector. The European Parliament broadly supports the proposal, but has suggested modifications to strengthen customer trust, promote innovation, and enhance data protection. Further revisions to the Payment Services Directive (PSD3) are also in progress to improve and expand upon the existing open banking framework.

The UK, having initially implemented open banking under the GDPR and PSD2, is now developing its open finance framework under the Data Protection and Digital Information Bill. This bill will provide the legal basis for government and regulators to establish smart data schemes across various sectors, including financial services. Key issues under consideration include commercial incentives for firms, ensuring compliance with Consumer Duty regulations, dispute resolution mechanisms, and the scope of data sharing. The government is also working on implementing pensions dashboards, which will enable individuals to view all their pension information in one place.

In April 2024, the UK government launched an industry-led taskforce, chaired by the Centre for Finance, Innovation and Technology (CFIT), to further develop the open finance framework. This taskforce aims to expand on the concept of open banking, allowing the secure sharing of a wider range of financial data. This initiative seeks to improve access to credit for small and medium-sized enterprises (SMEs) and identify new use cases for open finance. The taskforce will prioritize which data sets should be unlocked and develop APIs to facilitate this process. It will also explore commercial incentives to encourage the safe sharing of financial data.

CFIT has outlined a detailed roadmap for the implementation of open finance in the UK. In 2024, the focus will be on developing the regulatory framework, prioritizing use cases, and creating solutions for vulnerable customers. The following year, 2025, will involve developing standards, creating a more detailed roadmap, exploring commercial models, and developing solutions specifically for SMEs. By 2026, the goal is to roll out open finance more broadly, establish a data-sharing agreement, ensure the sustainability of the system, launch a future open banking entity, and foster industry capabilities. Looking beyond 2027, the focus will shift towards future open banking innovation and sustainable commercial models for premium APIs.

==== Latin America and the Caribbean (LAC) ====
Open finance is gaining traction in Latin America and the Caribbean (LAC), with several countries making significant strides in developing regulatory frameworks and implementing open banking initiatives. This progress has the potential to expand financial inclusion, increase competition, and foster innovation in the region's financial sector.

Brazil has emerged as a leader in open finance in the LAC region, with its central bank establishing a comprehensive regulatory framework and actively promoting its adoption. In May 2022, the central bank introduced interoperability standards that enable seamless data sharing between financial institutions and SUSEP, the entity overseeing insurance and pension markets. This promotes standardized data exchange and fosters a more integrated financial ecosystem. Brazil's open finance initiative aims to enhance financial inclusion, stimulate competition, promote transparency, and improve financial education. Brazil has adopted a phased implementation approach, starting with the sharing of public information and gradually progressing towards open data on insurance, pensions, and investments.

Chile has also made notable progress in establishing an open finance framework. In 2020, Chile's Financial Portability Law simplified the transfer of financial services between providers. This was followed by the Interchange Rates Law in 2021, which aimed to increase competition by regulating payment card fees. The same year also saw the enactment of a transparency law that reinforced the responsibilities of market agents and improved consumer protection. Building on this groundwork, Chile passed a comprehensive fintech law in 2022, which includes provisions for open finance. This law empowers the regulator to authorize the use of APIs for secure consumer information exchange, a significant step towards full open finance implementation. While formal open finance regulations are still pending, industry stakeholders like ABIF, BancoEstado, and FinteChile have proactively signed a voluntary framework agreement. This agreement establishes security standards, responsibilities, and access protocols for sharing financial consumer data, demonstrating a collaborative approach towards advancing open finance in the country.

Colombia joined the movement in July 2022, publishing Decree 1,297 outlining a voluntary framework for open finance and the development of standards for data sharing. The framework covers consumer data exchange, the administration of digital platforms and services, and payment initiation services. Several open finance platforms were already active in Colombia before the legal framework was established, thanks to existing laws that gave individuals control over their data sharing.

Ecuador followed suit in December 2022, enacting the fintech law, known as the Organic Law for the Development, Regulation, and Control of Technological Financial Services, which includes provisions for open banking services. The law defines different types of data within the financial services industry and mandates that the central bank implement arrangements for open banking services, including APIs for account information validation to facilitate interoperability with fintech companies.

While Argentina has not yet established a specific open finance regulation, the Banco Central de la República Argentina (BCRA) has implemented several measures to encourage digital payments and promote interoperability. These measures include the introduction of Transferencias 3.0, a real-time digital payment system, and regulations that allow digital wallets to link to accounts from other financial institutions. These developments have laid the groundwork for the future implementation of open finance in Argentina.

== Benefits ==
Open finance has the potential to provide various benefits for consumers, small and medium-sized enterprises (SMEs), and financial service providers.

=== Consumers ===
For consumers, open finance can enhance welfare by increasing access to suitable financial products. It enables consumers to securely share their financial data with a wider range of providers, potentially leading to lower borrowing costs, personalized loan options, and more suitable financial advice. By facilitating the aggregation of financial data from multiple sources, open finance can also improve consumers' ability to manage their finances and make informed decisions. Additionally, it can enhance transparency and control by empowering consumers to make informed choices about how their data is shared and used. Open finance may be particularly advantageous for consumers with limited or "thin" credit histories, as it allows lenders to access a more comprehensive view of their financial situation and potentially leading to more favorable credit decisions.

=== Small and Medium-Sized Enterprises (SMEs) ===
Small and medium-sized enterprises (SMEs) can also benefit from open finance. By providing lenders with a more complete picture of an SME's financial health, open finance can improve creditworthiness assessments and increase access to credit. Increased competition among lenders, driven by greater access to SME financial data, can lead to lower borrowing costs and better terms for SMEs. Furthermore, open finance enables the development of more tailored and flexible financial products that cater to the specific needs of SMEs.

=== Financial service providers ===
Financial service providers can also reap benefits from open finance. Access to a wider range of customer data can drive innovation and the development of new financial products and services. Providers can gain a deeper understanding of customer needs and preferences, allowing for more personalized and targeted offerings. Additionally, data-driven insights can help financial institutions streamline processes, automate decision-making, and improve resource allocation. Open finance can also foster collaboration and partnerships between traditional financial institutions and fintech companies, combining their strengths to deliver innovative solutions.

== Risks and challenges ==
Despite the potential benefits, open finance is not without its challenges and risks. For consumers, the increased sharing of financial data raises concerns about privacy and security. Data breaches at third-party providers could expose sensitive information, and the complex web of data sharing in open finance may lead to unintended uses of personal data that may erode consumer trust. This increased data flow could also make individuals more vulnerable to financial crimes. Moreover, there are concerns about the potential for algorithmic bias in data-driven open finance services. This bias could result in unfair pricing practices or even discrimination against certain individuals due to the use of outdated or incomplete data.

Financial institutions also face hurdles in adapting to open finance. They must contend with the operational challenges of managing APIs, ensuring seamless interoperability between systems, and bolstering cybersecurity measures to protect against evolving threats. Open finance also raises questions about fair competition, particularly if some institutions have greater access to data or face unequal costs in implementing the necessary systems. The potential for open finance to reshape the financial landscape by fragmenting value chains and fostering new platform models may require institutions to rethink their strategies and operations.

The implementation of open finance presents further complexities. A lack of standardized data formats and APIs can hinder interoperability between different platforms and systems. Maintaining secure API infrastructure and integrating it with existing legacy systems can create technical obstacles. Furthermore, establishing open finance systems necessitates significant investment in technology, data standardization, cybersecurity, and compliance. Determining how these costs are shared among participants is crucial for the successful and equitable adoption of open finance.

== See also ==
- Open banking
