= Telephone banking =

Financial service provided via telephone

Telephone banking is a service provided by a bank or other financial institution that enables customers to perform over the telephone a range of financial transactions that do not involve cash or financial instruments (such as checks) without the need to visit a bank branch or ATM.

== History ==
Telephone banking became commercially available in the 1980s, first introduced by Girobank in the United Kingdom, which established a dedicated telephone banking service in 1984. Telephone banking saw growth during the 1980s and early 1990s and was heavily used by the first generation of direct banks. However, the development of online banking in the early 2000s started a long-term decline in the use of telephone banking in favor of internet banking. The advent of mobile banking further eroded the use of telephone banking in the 2010s.

== Operation ==
To use a financial institution's telephone banking facility, a customer must first register with the institution for the service. They would be assigned a customer number (which is not the same as the account number), and they may be given or set up their own password (under various names) for customer verification.

Customers would call the special phone number set up by the bank and authenticate their identity through the customer number, a numeric or verbal password, or security questions asked by a live representative. The service can be provided using an automated system, using voice recognition capability, DTMF technology, or by live customer service representatives.

In India, a variation of telephone banking utilizing missed call numbers assigned to specific tasks (such as checking balances or performing money transfers) is offered by major banks.

== See also ==
- Bank account
- Mobile banking
- Online banking
