= Account aggregation =

Combining data from different accounts

Account aggregation sometimes also known as financial data aggregation is a method that involves compiling information from different accounts, which may include bank accounts, credit card, payroll accounts, investment accounts, and other consumer or business accounts, into a single place. This may be provided through connecting via an API to the financial institution or provided through "screen scraping" where a user provides the requisite account-access information for an automated system to gather and compile the information into a single page. The security of the account access details as well as the financial information is key to users having confidence in the service.

The database either resides in a web-based application or in client-side software. While such services are primarily designed to aggregate financial information, they sometimes also display other things such as the contents of e-mail boxes and news headlines.

== Account Aggregator System ==
Account aggregator system is a data-sharing system, which helps lenders to conduct an easy and speedy assessment of the creditworthiness of the borrower.

=== Components of Account Aggregator system ===
The Account Aggregator system essentially has three important components –

- Financial Information Provider (FIP)
- Financial Information User (FIU)
- Account Aggregators

Financial Information Providers has the necessary data about the customer, which it provides to the Financial Information Users. The Financial Information Provider can be a bank, a Non-Banking Financial Company (NBFC), mutual fund, insurance repository, pension fund repository, or even your wealth supervisor. The account aggregators act as the intermediary by collecting data from FIPs that hold the customer’s financial data and share that with FIUs such as lending banks/agencies that provide financial services.

== History ==
The ideas around account aggregation first emerged in the mid 1990s when banks started releasing Internet banking applications.

In the late 1990s services helped users to manage their money on the Internet (typical desktop alternatives include Microsoft Money, Intuit Quicken etc.) in an easy-to-use manner wherein they got functionalities like single password, one-click access to current account data, total net worth and expense analysis.

=== Initial setback ===
One of the first major account aggregation services was Citibank's My Accounts service, though this service ended in late 2005 without explanation from Citibank. Much has been said in the financial services and banking industry as to the benefits of account aggregation – principally the customer and web site loyalty it might generate for providers – but the lack of responsibility and commitment by the providers is one reason for skepticism about committing to those same providers.

=== New applications ===
Account aggregation evolved with single sign-on (SSO) at most major banks such as Bank of America. With SSO (usually implemented via SAML) major financial institutions are now expanding their aggregation services into new areas. Rich Presentment (getting all the information about a bill that you owe) is a service that uses aggregation extensively and can be seen at AOL, using AOL Bill Pay. Aggregation also powers applications such as funds transfer, new account opening, card-based bill pay and so on.

=== Independent financial advisers ===
Independent financial advisers are another group on which account aggregators began focusing their attention. Having seen increasing competition from the other different financial advisers, positioning themselves as their client's primary advisor was not as easy as it once was.

=== Open banking ===
Starting in 2015 developments such as open banking made it easier for third parties to access bank transaction data and introduced standard API and security models.

=== Income and Employment verification ===
By integrating data from bank accounts, payroll systems and other financial sources, account aggregation provides a holistic picture of a borrower’s financial situation and verification of employment. By leveraging the technology, lenders can meet the rigorous standards set by entities like Fannie Mae and Freddie Mac, ensuring compliance while benefiting from increased operational efficiency.

==== India ====
In India Sahamathi is an account aggregator which has 81 Participating banks and other investments like mutual fund and Investment portfolio

== See also ==
- Online banking
- Open banking
- Payment Services Directive
- Password manager
- Password fatigue
