= Arjun Sethi (entrepreneur) =

American entrepreneur, investor and executive (born 1983)

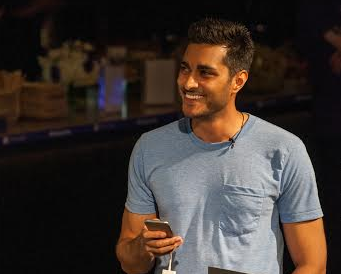
- Sethi in 2015
- Born: January 15, 1983 (age 43)
- Education: University of Maryland, Boston University
- Occupations: Venture capitalist, business executive
- Years active: 1990s-present
- Known for: Co-founder of Lolapps, MessageMe, Yahoo! Livetext, Tribe Capital
- Title: Kraken (co-CEO); Tribe Capital (Chairman)
- Board member of: Kraken, Tribe Capital, Docker, Relativity Space, Carta, Social Capital (venture capital), others

Arjun Sethi (born January 15, 1983) is an American internet entrepreneur, investor and executive. Currently a co-CEO of the cryptocurrency exchange Kraken, he is also chairman of Tribe Capital, a company he co-founded in 2018. Earlier in his career, he was a partner at Social Capital and an executive at Yahoo!, where he launched Yahoo! Livetext. He was also co-founder and CEO of MessageMe (acquired by Yahoo!) and CEO of Lolapps. In recent years he has co-founded a number of technology startups, including Kapital, Nibiru in 2022, and Termina in 2024. A well known angel investor, by 2024 he had invested in over 100 technology companies.

== Early life and education ==
Arjun Sethi grew up in Santa Clara, California. His parents were involved with the startup industry in Silicon Valley, and Sethi learned to code at a young age. Building websites as a freelancer, he studied economics from Boston University and earned a B.A. in history from the University of Maryland.

== Career ==
=== Early roles and startups (1990s-2012) ===
Early in his career, Sethi served as chief product officer of the app monetisation company Tapjoy, and in 1999 he co-founded the manufacturing company Advanced Tuning Products. Sethi's first technology startup was ROFLplay, a social gaming company. Founded by Sethi in January 2007 with Sethi as CEO, ROFLplay was acquired by Lolapps in June 2009, and Sethi became Lolapps' Head of Business and Corporate Development. Lolapps, which developed social games on the Facebook platform such as Ravenwood Fair, had 150 million monthly active users across its portfolio of games at its peak. Lolapps named Sethi as its CEO in March 2010, and merged with game publisher 6waves in 2011. The merged entity, 6waves Lolapps, was the second largest game publisher on Facebook after Zynga as measured by monthly active users. With Sethi serving as chief product officer until 2012, 6waves Lolapps was subsequently rebranded and acquired by Stillfront Group in 2022 for $201 million.

=== MessageMe and Yahoo (2012-2015) ===
Sethi left 6waves Lolapps in 2012 to join the venture capital firm Social Capital as an entrepreneur in residence. In 2012, Sethi became co-founder and CEO of mobile messaging app MessageMe, which combined audio, video and doodles. MessageMe reached five million users within 75 days of launch, and raised around $12 million from Greylock Partners. MessageMe's rapid growth led to Facebook revoking its access to the Facebook Platform’s “Find Friends” functionality for competitive reasons. NBC later published court documents containing emails where Facebook expressed concern over negative publicity related to the revoked access, particularly given Sethi’s relationship with Social Capital and previous position at Lolapps.

Yahoo acquired MessageMe in 2014 for a price between $30 million and $40 million. Yahoo shut the app down and put Sethi and the ex-MessageMe team to work on a Yahoo messaging app meant to compete with Snapchat and WhatsApp. Yahoo's acquisition of MessageMe was part of CEO Marissa Mayer's larger strategy to bring in new talent via small startup acquisitions. He served as Senior Director of Product Management, Growth, and Emerging Products at Yahoo, leading development of the company's messaging products. According to Forbes, while Sethi was leading Yahoo's mobile and emerging products, mobile product usage at Yahoo jumped from 100 million to 1 billion monthly active unique users.

In July 2015, Sethi and the former MessageMe team launched Yahoo! Livetext, an audio-free video messaging app. Sethi originated the idea of no audio, with the app instead prioritizing chat messages and emojis, as well as video showing the users' environment. New Indian Express called the lack of audio "truly innovative to the point of baffling." It failed to gain significant traction and Yahoo shut down the product in 2016.

=== Social Capital and Tribe Capital CEO (2016-2023) ===
In early 2016, Sethi left Yahoo to join Social Capital as an investing partner focused on consumer startups. At Social Capital, Sethi backed the firm's investments in and served on the board of directors of Carta and Relativity Space. Leading the Social Capital venture team, he also oversaw investments in companies such as Cloud Kitchens and Front. He resigned from Social Capital in 2018, while retaining a number of his Social Capital board seats after leaving.

In 2018, Sethi and two former Social Capital investing partners, Ted Maidenberg and Jonathan Hsu, formed Tribe Capital. Tribe invests in early-stage startups and uses quantitative data to inform investment decisions. Serving as Tribe's CEO, Sethi made its first investment in cryptocurrency trading platform Sfox. With $200 million targeted for its first fund, he also added to his earlier investments in Carta, Relativity Space, and Cover. Other Tribe investments have included FTX, Kraken, Applied Intuition, EquipmentShare, Docker, Republic, Instabase, and Momentus. Tribe raised $335 million for its second fund and $394 million for its third fund, and has started an investment program for accredited investors.

=== Angel investing, Kapital, Tribe spinoffs (2020-2024) ===
With personal investments in companies such as Opendoor, Gusto, and Long-Term Stock Exchange, and Rubrik, he was named to the Forbes 2020 Midas Brink List.

Sethi joined the board of Kraken in 2021. In Mar. 2021, Tribe and Arrow Capital co-sponsored a SPAC, raising $240 million and appointing Sethi as CEO. Tribe filed plans for a second SPAC IPO later that month. In July 2022, Sethi announced that Tribe was launching a incubator program. Tribe Crypto Labs' first incubation was Nibiru, a crypto derivatives trading protocol that Sethi co-founded and launched in September 2022. He raised $7.5 mill. at a $100 mill. valuation, with investors such as Tribe Capital, Republic Capital, and Kraken.

Sethi is listed as a co-founder of Kapital, a fintech company headquartered in Mexico City and focused on AI and blockchain. In December 2023, he joined Kapital cofounders Rene Saul, Fernando Sandoval and Eder Echeverria on the Kapital board. In 2023, Kapital raised $165 million and acquired Banco Autofin Mexico in 2023, also opening a physical bank branch in Bogota, Colombia. Kapital was named to the 2024 CNBC Disruptor 50 list five months later.

By September 2023, he had invested in 100 technology companies, including independent investments in Opendoor, Gusto, and Truecaller. In December 2023, he transitioned from CEO of Tribe Capital to chairman and chief investment officer (CIO). At the time, Tribe Capital had approximately $1.6 billion in assets under management, about 20% of which was invested in India. In April 2024, Tribe Capital formed Tribe Capital Management India Pvt Ltd. Co-owned by Sethi, the asset management company is based in Gurugram and initially invested in Shiprocket.

=== Termina and Kraken co-CEO (2023-2025) ===
When Sethi stepped down as Tribe's CEO he began focusing on the Tribe spinoff Termina, which he had been working on for around a decade. Founded in late 2023 and soft-launched on February 8, 2024, Termina is an AI software platform for investors to perform quantitative due diligence on potential investments. The program is used by "sovereign governments, sovereign wealth and pension funds, family offices and private fund managers." Sethi initially raised $10 million for its growth, also investing personally.

He was appointed co-CEO of Kraken in October 2024. Kraken, a major cryptocurrency exchange, had recently been through a number of management changes and cuts to its workforce. He began serving as co-CEO alongside David Ripley, who had been CEO since 2023. In December 2024, the Wall Street Journal reported that Kraken had donated $1 million to the Trump campaign. It was also reported that Sethi and Kraken chairman Jesse Powell had both met with Trump throughout his campaign and after the election, discussing topics such as crypto policies.

In April 2024, Sethi co-founded the startup Foundation, Inc. with Sankaet Pathak and Mike LeBlanc.

== Boards ==
Sethi serves on the board of directors of companies such as Kraken, Docker, Front, Relativity Space, Cover, Carta, SFOX, Social Capital, and Tribe Capital. In October 2024, he remained Tribe Capital's chairman.

== See also ==
- List of Internet entrepreneurs
