= Foundation, Inc. =

American robotics company

Foundation Future Industries
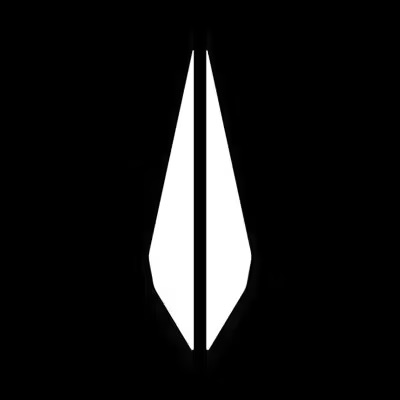
- Type: Private
- Industry: Robotics
- Founded: 2024; 2 years ago
- Founders: Sankaet Pathak; Arjun Sethi; Mike LeBlanc
- Headquarters: San Francisco, California, United States
- Key people: Sankaet Pathak (CEO); Mike LeBlanc (President)
- Products: Phantom (humanoid robot)
- Website: foundation.bot

Foundation Future Industries, Inc., also known as Foundation Robotics Labs or simply Foundation, is an American robotics company based in San Francisco, California. Founded in 2024, the company develops Phantom, a humanoid robot marketed for both industrial and military applications. The company has attracted attention for explicitly targeting the United States Armed Forces as a customer and for sending two of its robots to Ukraine for battlefield testing in 2026.

== History ==
Foundation was founded in 2024 by Mike LeBlanc, Sankaet Pathak, and Arjun Sethi. LeBlanc, a United States Marine Corps veteran, previously co-founded the security robotics company Cobalt Robotics, where he served as president and chief operating officer until the company's acquisition. Before founding Foundation, Pathak was chief executive of the financial technology company Synapse, a banking as a service platform that filed for bankruptcy in April, 2024. Sethi is a co-founder and chairman of the venture capital firm Tribe Capital and co-chief executive of the cryptocurrency exchange Kraken.

Foundation recruited engineers from companies including Tesla, Boston Dynamics, 1X and SpaceX. As of mid-2026, the company was reported to be seeking $500 million in new funding at a valuation above $3 billion.

In July 2025, Anduril founder Palmer Luckey delivered a talk at the Reindustrialize Summit in Detroit remotely, by teleoperating a Foundation Phantom robot through a virtual reality headset while the robot mirrored his movements on stage.

Eric Trump was hired as the company's chief strategy advisor in March 2026. In November 2026, it was reported that Foundation had been unable to pay staff salaries a year after Pathak had borrowed $4.6 million from the company as a loan to purchase a home.

== Products ==
=== Phantom MK-1 ===
Foundation's primary product is the Phantom, first-generation model Phantom MK-1, which the company unveiled in October 2025. The robot stands approximately 5 feet 9 inches (1.75 m) tall and weighs roughly 175–180 pounds (79–82 kg). It is designed to carry a payload of up to about 44 pounds (20 kg), moves at a top speed of about 1.7 metres per second, and uses a camera-based perception system rather than lidar.

The robot is powered by proprietary cycloidal actuators, which the company says provides high energy efficiency and quieter operation than the harmonic drives used in some competing designs. According to Pathak, its control software combines a large language model for high-level task planning with physics-based action models that translate instructions into motion. Foundation offers the robot through a leasing model rather than outright sale, at a reported unit cost of approximately $150,000 or about $100,000 per year to lease. MK-1 units have been deployed for trials in industrial facilities, including an automaker in the Atlanta area and consumer-goods manufacturers.

Pathak has stated production targets of 40 units in 2025, 10,000 units in 2026, and up to 50,000 units by the end of 2027, describing the timeline as aggressive and giving it a "non-zero chance" of success.

=== Phantom MK-2 ===
Foundation has announced a second-generation model, the Phantom MK-2, with planned upgrades including waterproofing, consolidated electronics, larger battery packs and an increased payload capacity reported at up to 80 kilograms (176 lb). According to Pathak, the MK-2 is intended to provide about six hours of operating time, the ability to recover after falling, and redesigned hands with articulated wrists capable of operating firearms. Pathak has said the company intends to send MK-2 units to Ukraine for further testing in 2026.

== Military applications ==
Foundation markets the Phantom for defense roles including reconnaissance, bomb disposal, logistics, and other high-risk ground operations, as well as, more controversially, combat roles that LeBlanc has termed "frontline weaponisation." LeBlanc, a former United States Marine Corps officer, has said the company believes robots could eventually undertake dangerous battlefield tasks currently performed by soldiers, publicly characterizing the machines as "great weapons" and comparing the technology to a shotgun. In a February 2026 interview with Time, LeBlanc said the company believed there was "a moral imperative to put these robots into war instead of soldiers." He has also said Foundation held discussions with the United States Department of Homeland Security regarding potential border-patrol applications.

=== Ukraine deployment ===
In February 2026, Foundation sent two Phantom MK-1 units to Ukraine for testing amid the Russian invasion of Ukraine, primarily for logistics and reconnaissance tasks in hazardous areas. The company described the deployment as the first known instance of a humanoid robot being tested in an active combat zone. Reporting on the trials noted significant limitations of the platform, including limited payload capacity, a lack of waterproofing, and insufficient battery endurance for large-scale operational use. During a visit by Time journalists, one of the robots fell repeatedly.

=== Pentagon contracts ===
Foundation has received U.S. government research contracts totaling $24 million for feasibility testing in inspection, logistics, and weapons handling across the Army, Navy and Air Force.

== Reception ==
In April 2026, senator Elizabeth Warren responded to the announcement of a $24 million contract between Foundation and the Department of Defense as "corruption in plain sight", citing son of U.S. president Donald Trump Eric Trump's role as the company's chief strategy adviser.

Analysts and robotics experts have questioned whether Foundation can meet its production targets, noting that scaling from dozens of units to tens of thousands would require a large increase over the company's disclosed funding, and that no humanoid robot has yet matched human speed and reliability in the field. The weaponization of humanoid robots has also raised ethical concerns regarding autonomous decision-making in combat; Foundation states that a human operator retains final authority over any lethal action, consistent with existing U.S. Department of Defense policy.

== See also ==
- Military robot
- Unmanned ground vehicle
- Military applications of artificial intelligence
- Lethal autonomous weapon § Standard used in US policy
