= Greenhouse Software =

American recruiting software company

Greenhouse Software, Inc.
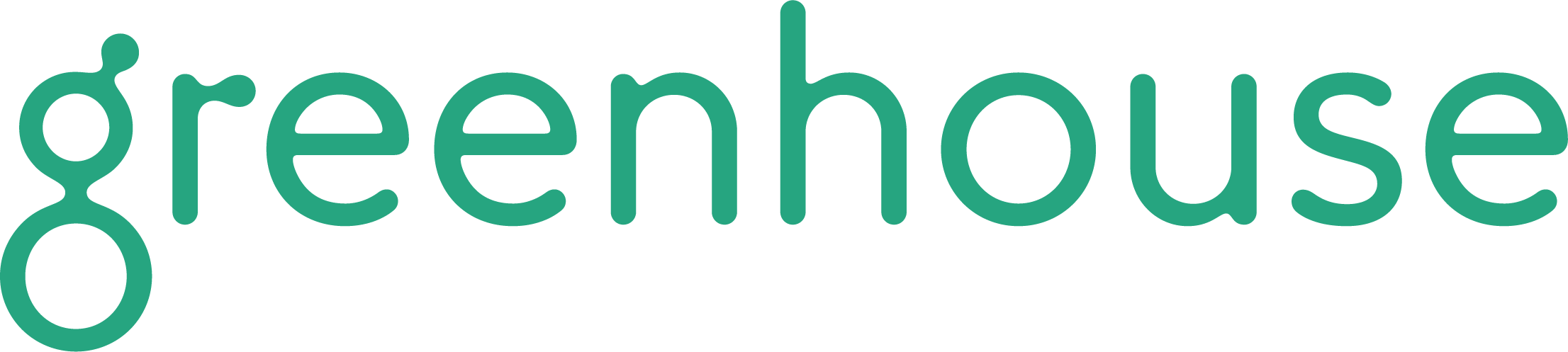
- Greenhouse Software's logo
- Industry: Technology
- Founded: 2012
- Founders: Daniel Chait and Jon Stross
- Headquarters: New York City
- Key people: Daniel Chait (CEO); Jon Stross (President); Jung-Kyu McCann (CLO); Donald Knight (CPO); Henry Tsai (CPO); Sean Murray (CRO); Carin Van Vuuren (CMO); Sarah Bernard (CCO)
- Website: www.greenhouse.com

Greenhouse Software (commonly known as Greenhouse) is an American technology company headquartered in New York City that provides a recruiting software as a service. It was founded in 2012 by Daniel Chait and Jon Stross, two Class of 1995 graduates from the University of Michigan.

The company raised $2.7 million in a seed round in 2013, $7.5 million in its Series A round in 2014, $13.6 million in its Series B round in 2015, $35 million in its Series C round in 2015, and $50 million in its Series D round in 2018. Research firm CB Insights, in a study commissioned by The New York Times, listed Greenhouse among fifty startups predicted to become unicorns, which refer to privately owned startup companies valued at over $1 billion.

Daniel Chait is CEO of the company.

== History ==
=== Early history: founding, seed funding, and Series A round (2012–2014) ===
Greenhouse Software cofounder Daniel Chait founded banking software startup company Lab49 from his kitchen. While running Lab49, Chait had to deal with the pressures and obligations of recruitment. After he sold his stake in Lab49 in 2011, he decided to focus his next business venture on recruiting, which he told TechCrunch in a November 2013 interview "seemed like a big opportunity". Greenhouse was founded in 2012.

On November 14, 2013, Greenhouse raised $2.7 million in a seed round led by Social+Capital Partnership and Resolute Ventures. The angel investors who participated in the seed round were Nick Ganju (a founder of ZocDoc), Seth Goldstein (a founder of DJZ and Turntable.fm), Thatcher Bell (a founder of DFJ Gotham Ventures), Thomas Lehrman (a founder of Gerson Lehrman Group), and Bill Lohse (an early investor in Pinterest). The funding round's aim was to expand the engineering, sales, and marketing teams, as well as increase the number of customers Greenhouse could take on.

In August 2014, Greenhouse raised $7.5 million in its Series A round led by Social+Capital Partnership. Resolute Ventures and Felicis Ventures were part of the funding round. Social+Capital Partnership's Mamoon Hamid joined Greenhouse's board. The company aimed to use the money to increase hiring and to market its software.

=== Series B round and Series C round (2015) ===
In March 2015, Greenhouse secured $13.6 million in its Series B round led by Benchmark. The Social+Capital Partnership, Felicis Ventures and Resolute Ventures participated in the funding round. Benchmark's Matt Cohler joined Greenhouse's board of directors. According to CEO Daniel Chait, the company's valuation had grown by 2.5 times since the Series A round. The company aimed to use the money to expand the sales team and to handle security audits and internationalization. It further planned to improve its product to better predict ways to get superior candidates.

In August 2015, Greenhouse received $35 million in its Series C round led by Thrive Capital. Between its Series B and Series C rounds, the company nearly doubled the number of customers, from 450 to 800. The company had 125 employees when it closed its Series C round, up from 45 at the beginning of 2015. Because Greenhouse had only 10% of its customer base outside of the United States, it planned to use the funding for increasing the sales team outside the U.S. They also planned to improve the site infrastructure and complete several confidential research and development ventures. Greenhouse is based in New York City but has an office in San Francisco and intends to add offices abroad.

In August 2015, at the request of The New York Times, the research firm CB Insights ran tests based on funds raised and employee retention rate to predict which startups would become the next unicorns, companies with at least a $1 billion valuation. CB Insights predicted that Greenhouse would become a unicorn.

=== Later history: private equity takeover (2021–present) ===
In January 2021, it was reported that TPG invested $47 million at a valuation of $820 million and spent $450 million buying shares from existing investors taking a majority stake in the company. Debt financing for the investment was provided by Carlyle Global Credit and AB Private Credit Investors.

=== Product ===
Greenhouse provides a recruiting software as a service. Greenhouse sells annual licenses to companies, allowing them to use Greenhouse's software. Greenhouse collects into one dashboard the job seekers' applications from different routes like employment websites and referrals. Greenhouse is an open platform that uses an application programming interface (API) to facilitate the aggregation. From early on, the company was aiming to be a hub for recruiting applications and, as a result, it integrates with a large number of other SaaS products such as Zapier, Workato, HireVue, Connectifier, and Clara Labs. To determine which job posts are more effective, it allows companies to do A/B testing. Greenhouse lets companies create a uniform interview procedure so candidates can be judged based on the same rubric. It aggregates a candidate's resumes and interview feedback for comparison with the job opening's specifications. It allows companies to compare candidates against each other and to compare their hiring metrics against the industry standards.

In 2025, Greenhouse announced Greenhouse Real Talent, a product that filters out fake or AI-generated applications that have been submitted. Greenhouse partnered with CLEAR to include identity verification within the product.

== See also ==
- Tech companies in the New York metropolitan area
