= Yahoo Livetext =

Video messaging app

Yahoo! Livetext
- Developer: Yahoo!
- Release: July 29, 2015; 11 years ago

Yahoo! Livetext was an audio-free video messaging app built by Yahoo for the iPhone and Android. Launched in July 2015, Livetext represented Yahoo's attempt to compete in mobile messaging with apps like Snapchat, Facebook Messenger and WhatsApp. Livetext never gained significant traction and shut down eight months later in March 2016.

== History ==
Livetext was part of CEO Marissa Mayer's effort to revamp Yahoo's aging services and make the shift to mobile. Livetext complimented its popular desktop-centric communication products Yahoo! Mail and Yahoo! Messenger.

In October 2014, Yahoo acquired MessageMe, a messaging app with several million users. The MessageMe acquisition happened as part of a broader strategy on the part of Mayer to bring talent to Yahoo via small startup acquisitions. The MessageMe team led development on Livetext and built Livetext on top of MessageMe technology.

In July 2015, Livetext debuted in the top 150 apps in the App Store. Two weeks later, it had dropped out of the top 1,000 apps.

In February 2016, ex-MessageMe co-founder and CEO Arjun Sethi left Yahoo to join Social Capital as an investing partner. By the time of Sethi's departure, over one third of startup founders—26 out of 70 that came from 53 acquisitions—who had joined Yahoo via acquisition had left Yahoo. Later in February, Yahoo began layoffs that amounted to about 15 percent of employee headcount.

In March 2016, Yahoo announced that it would shut down Livetext as part of a broader effort to simplify its product line that included cutting Yahoo! Games, Yahoo Astrology, and Yahoo! Search BOSS. It stated that it would incorporate Livetext product features into Yahoo Messenger as its core messaging service. In July 2018, Yahoo shut down Yahoo Messenger.

== Features ==
The core feature of Livetext was silent video text messaging. Participants could text message and see each other via live streaming video but the audio would remain silent and could not be turned on. The lack of audio meant that Livetext could be used anywhere that traditional text messaging could be used like at work or on public transportation.

Like Snapchat, chat sessions were ephemeral which meant the app kept no record of the video stream or text messages.

Due to the novelty of Livetext's core feature, commentators and reviewers described the app as "weird", "awkward" and "strange".
