= Klemmer =

Klemmer may refer to:

- Ulmus × hollandica 'Klemmer' Elm cultivar
- Elbling The German wine grape known as Klemmer
- Klemmer (surname)
