= Mike LeBlanc =

American entrepreneur and Marine Corps officer

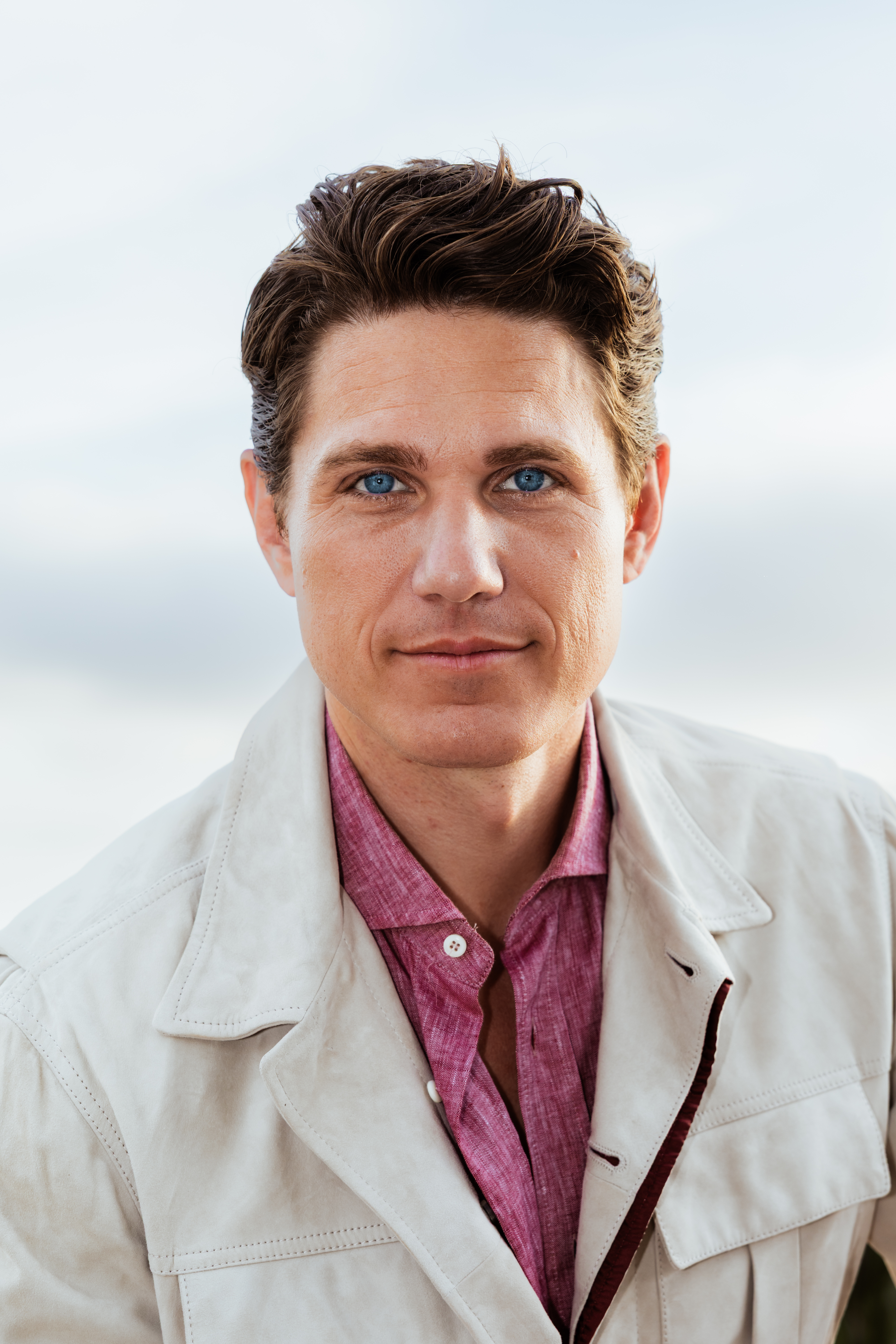
- Born: March 10, 1986 (age 40); Lyndhurst, Ohio, U.S.
- Citizenship: United States
- Education: St. John's College (BA, 2009); Harvard Business School (MBA, 2019)
- Occupations: Business executive; author
- Years active: 2000s–present
- Known for: Co-founding Cobalt Robotics and Foundation, Inc.
- Spouse: Chiryze LeBlanc
- Children: 3
Military service
- Military career
- Branch: United States Marine Corps
- Service years: 13
- Rank: Major (O-4)
- Unit: 1st Reconnaissance Battalion
- Conflicts: War in Afghanistan
- Awards: Navy and Marine Corps Commendation Medal; Joint Service Achievement Medal
- Website: officialmikeleblanc.com

Mike LeBlanc is an American entrepreneur and former United States Marine Corps officer. He co-founded Cobalt Robotics, which developed security robots for commercial buildings, and Foundation, Inc., which develops humanoid robots for industrial and defense use.

LeBlanc served 13 years as a Marine Corps officer in infantry and intelligence roles, deploying three times to the Middle East, and later earned an MBA from Harvard Business School. He co-founded Cobalt Robotics in 2019 and sold it in 2024, then co-founded Foundation with Sankaet Pathak and Arjun Sethi.

LeBlanc is an advocate for deploying humanoid robots in combat, a position that has drawn criticism from legal scholars, arms-control advocates, and military analysts. He has created veteran hiring initiatives at Cobalt Robotics. His first book, What If Anger Is the Answer?, is scheduled for publication in November 2026.

== Early life and education ==
LeBlanc was born and raised in Lyndhurst, Ohio; his father was a house painter and his mother a schoolteacher. He graduated from St. John's College in Annapolis in 2009. He has said that reading Thucydides as an undergraduate led him toward military service.

Following his military service, LeBlanc earned an MBA from Harvard Business School in 2019, supported by the Timothy T. Day Marine Corps Entrepreneur Fellowship.

== Military service ==
LeBlanc was a commissioned officer in the Marine Corps for 13 years, serving in infantry and intelligence roles and attaining the rank of major. He deployed three times to the Middle East, including combat tours in Afghanistan.

He spent twelve months as an adviser to the Afghan National Army in southern Helmand Province, taking part in more than 300 combat patrols, for which he received the Navy and Marine Corps Commendation Medal. He later joined the 1st Reconnaissance Battalion at Marine Corps Base Camp Pendleton and deployed to the Arabian Peninsula with Joint Special Operations Task Force – Arabian Peninsula, receiving the Joint Service Achievement Medal for work relating to operations against the Islamic State. While in the Marine Corps Reserve, he did work for the Pentagon assessing technologies for military application.

== Career ==
=== Cobalt Robotics ===
LeBlanc joined Cobalt Robotics in 2019 as president, co-founder, and chief operating officer. The company developed security robots that patrolled offices and commercial buildings alongside human security staff. His work there was the subject of a Harvard Business School case study in 2019. In 2024 he sold the company to entrepreneur Dean Drako for an undisclosed amount.

LeBlanc has said that difficulties he experienced while transitioning out of the Marine Corps influenced his approach to hiring veterans. At Cobalt Robotics he oversaw hiring initiatives under which more than 30 percent of the workforce were former military members, with recruitment focused in part on personnel from Marine Corps Base Camp Pendleton. The company participated in the United States Department of Defense's SkillBridge program.

=== Foundation ===
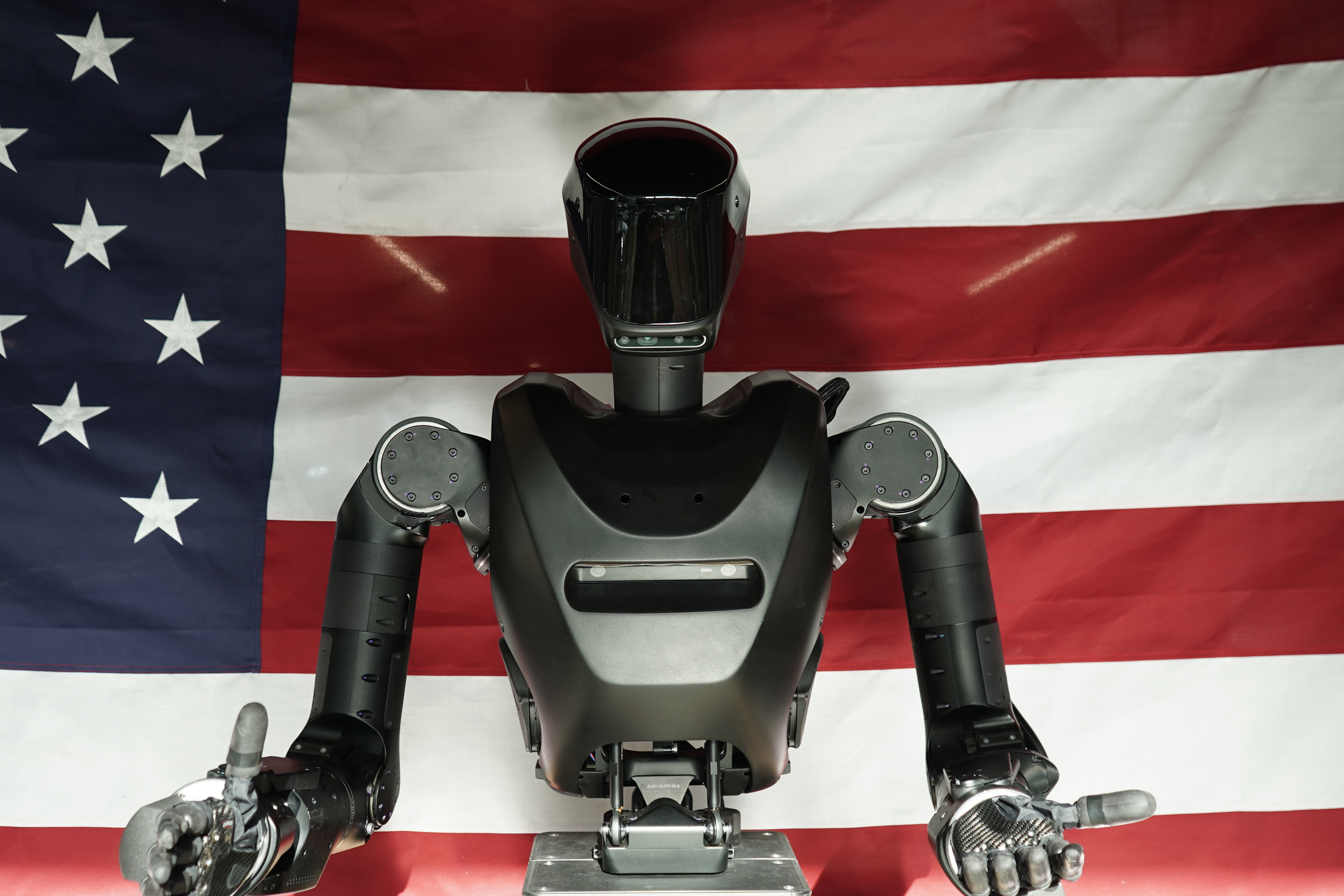
Foundation's Phantom MK-1 humanoid robot

In April 2024, LeBlanc co-founded Foundation, a robotics company developing humanoid robots for defense applications, with chief executive Sankaet Pathak and Tribe Capital co-founder Arjun Sethi. The company's Phantom robot was designed primarily for defense use, and LeBlanc has supported the development of combat applications for it.

In June 2024, CNBC reported that Foundation's fundraising materials had overstated the company's relationship with General Motors; GM denied having any formal agreements with the company, and LeBlanc confirmed GM's account.

By early 2026, Foundation had received $24 million in research contracts from the United States Army, Navy, and Air Force and had been awarded SBIR Phase 3 status. In February 2026, two Phantom robots were deployed to Ukraine for reconnaissance and logistics tasks, with LeBlanc accompanying the deployment; reporting in May 2026 described the robot as useful for carrying supplies but limited by payload, battery life, and weatherproofing.

Eric Trump, son of President Donald Trump, invested in Foundation and later became its chief strategy adviser. The appointment drew criticism from Senator Elizabeth Warren, who characterized the company's federal contracts as "corruption in plain sight"; a Foundation spokesperson said Eric Trump had been an investor before becoming an adviser.

== Views on automated warfare ==
LeBlanc has said that there is a "moral imperative to put these robots into war instead of soldiers." He considers the humanoid form valuable because it allows robots to use weapons and vehicles designed for people; his aim is for Phantom to operate any weapon a human can use. Accordin to LeBlanc, Foundation is the only American company developing humanoid robots for front-line roles.

LeBlanc has said that United States military officials involved in discussions with Foundation insisted service members would authorize every use of lethal force, comparable to the approval process for a drone strike. Foundation's contracts as of early 2026 did not authorize arming the robots, and the units sent to Ukraine were unarmed. He has discussed possible domestic applications, including border patrol.

LeBlanc publicly disagreed with the 2022 open letter in which six robotics companies, led by Boston Dynamics, pledged not to weaponize their general-purpose robots. He said that competitors' unwillingness to pursue military work had left Foundation an unobstructed path to market and that "there's no moral debate going on in China" over the use of robots in combat.

=== Criticisms ===
His position has drawn criticism on accountability and humanitarian grounds. Bonnie Docherty of the International Human Rights Clinic at Harvard Law School has argued that autonomous weapons raise unresolved concerns under international law, and United Nations Secretary-General António Guterres has characterized such weapons as politically unacceptable and morally repugnant. Nicole van Rooijen of the Stop Killer Robots coalition told the BBC that lethal autonomous weapons lower the threshold for war and obscure accountability, and described the humanoid form as particularly concerning. Other researchers have questioned the technology's near-term feasibility rather than its ethics, arguing that existing humanoid systems cannot cope with the uncertainty of combat environments.

== Writing ==

LeBlanc's first book, What If Anger Is the Answer? A Harvard Marine's Guide to Shaping Aggression, is scheduled for publication on November 3, 2026 by Matt Holt Books and distributed by Simon & Schuster.

The publisher describes the book as combining LeBlanc's account of how the Marine Corps and the war in Afghanistan shaped his anger and aggression with lessons from ancient philosophy, military leadership, and the technology industry. Its premise draws on the ancient Greek view of anger as a separate part of the soul requiring its own education, arguing that aggression can be trained and directed rather than suppressed.

LeBlanc has said the book began as a journal he kept in Afghanistan and that he later reframed as a letter to his son, which remains as its opening.

The book's back cover carries endorsements from authors including Steven Pressfield, Nathaniel Fick, and Robin Hutton. Pressfield, author of The War of Art and Gates of Fire, wrote that the present is a time "hungry for virtue—and flooded with its imitations," and that the book "is about the real thing."

== Personal life ==
LeBlanc lives in Newport Beach, California, with his wife, Chiryze, and their three children. As of 2026 he serves on the board of the Timothy T. Day Foundation, a nonprofit supporting Marine Corps veterans.

== See also ==
- Military robots
