= 333 Bush Street =

43-floor skyscraper in San Francisco

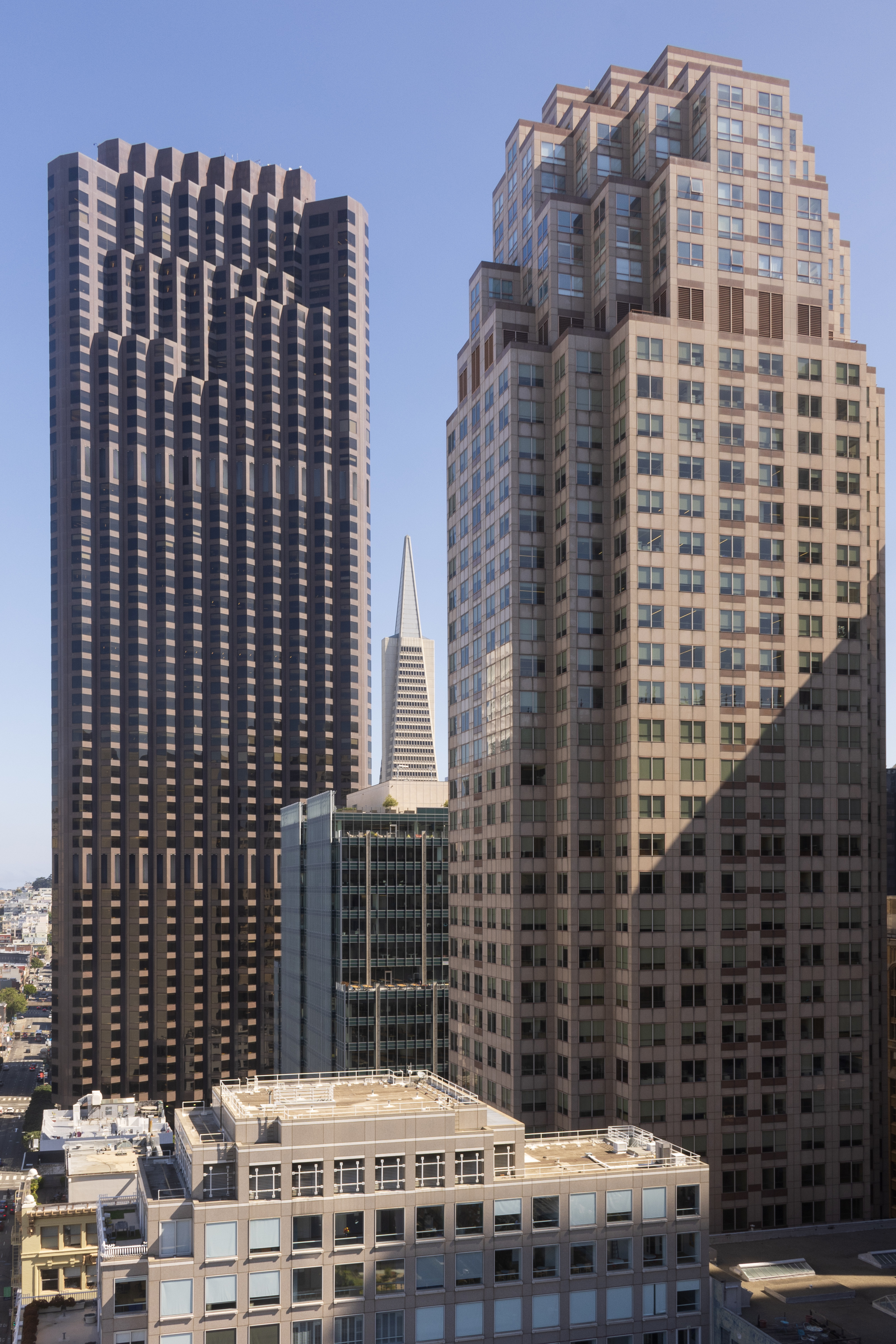
- 333 Bush Street (right)

- Location within San Francisco 333 Bush Street (California) 333 Bush Street (the United States)

General information
- Type: Commercial offices Residential condominiums
- Location: 333 Bush Street; San Francisco, California
- Coordinates: 37.7906°N 122.4030°W
- Completed: 1986
- Owner: Tishman Speyer

Height
- Roof: 151 m (495 ft)

Technical details
- Floor count: 43
- Floor area: 50,422 m^{2} (542,740 sq ft)

Design and construction
- Architect: Skidmore, Owings & Merrill

333 Bush Street is a 43-floor, 151 m (495 ft) mixed-use skyscraper located on Bush Street in the Financial District of San Francisco, California. The building was completed in 1986 and was designed by Skidmore, Owings & Merrill and contains commercial offices as well as seven stories of individually owned residential condominiums. It is one of 39 San Francisco high rises reported by the U.S. Geological Survey as potentially vulnerable to a large earthquake, due to a flawed welding technique.

== Recent ownership history ==
In 2009, the tower's owners, Hines and Sterling American Property, forfeited ownership to their lenders after the primary tenant, multinational law firm Heller Ehrman filed for bankruptcy and defaulted on rent payments leaving property 65 percent vacant. In 2013, the building was purchased by a joint venture of Massachusetts Pension Reserves Investment Management Board and DivcoWest Properties for US$275 million. In 2015, the property was acquired by Tishman Speyer for US$380 million.

== Tenants ==
- State Compensation Insurance Fund
- National Park Service Pacific West Regional Office
- Federal Home Loan Bank of San Francisco
- Littler Mendelson
- Lewis Brisbois Bisgaard & Smith
- Andersen Tax LLC
- Sen. Alex Padilla (Office)
- Carta (software company)

== See also ==
- San Francisco's tallest buildings
