= Sankaet Pathak =

Indian-American businessman

- Education: MS in electrical engineering, University of Memphis
- Occupation: Entrepreneur
- Years active: 2014–present
- Known for: Founder of Synapse Financial Technologies and Foundation, Inc.
- Website: foundation.bot

Sankaet Pathak is an Indian-American businessman and entrepreneur known for founding robotics startup Foundation, Inc. and the defunct fintech company Synapse Financial Technologies. He currently serves as the CEO of Foundation, Inc.

== Early life and education ==
Sankaet Pathak grew up in Rajasthan, India. He attended the University of Memphis, where he studied computer engineering, mathematics and physics. He graduated with a master's degree in electrical engineering. In 2014, he was an inaugural Crews Center Entrepreneurship Fellow at the FedEx Institute of Technology.

== Career ==
=== Synapse Financial Services ===
While living with roommates in Twin Peaks, San Francisco, Pathak founded the banking as a service (BaaS) platform Synapse Financial Technologies. The company was originally founded to provide banking services to traditionally underbanked customers.

The company launched in 2014 and raised $51 million from various investors, including the privately-held venture capital firm Andreessen Horowitz. It partnered with around 100 financial technology companies including Dave and Honey, and indirectly provided banking services to an estimated 10 million retail customers. In 2022, the company was listed as one of the 100 fastest growing financial services companies in the United States by Inc. Magazine.

According to a Forbes article from 2020, former Synapse employees reported Pathak was an autocratic and volatile manager, who often hired inexperienced people for lower salaries and maintained a non-professional work environment. Employees reported that the technology could be unreliable or broken as a consequence. Forbes reported customers were leaving as Patak's "short fuse, poor judgment, and bad management practices have left Synapse with its future in jeopardy." The board of Synapse considered replacing Pathak in 2023 due to complaints about discrepancies in the company's ledgers of customer funds, but investors from Andreessen Horowitz argued against and prevented this.

After one year, in 2024, the company filed for bankruptcy. Tens of thousands of customers were locked out of access to their savings accounts for an extended period of time. Due to inadequate ledgering, among other reasons, a shortfall of $65m to $95m was reported to be missing. Yale's Journal of International Affairs opined that the Synapse collapse was a "wake-up call about the gap between what fintech companies promise and the regulations designed to protect users." The article contested that the crisis demonstrated how the 'banking-as-a-service' (BaaS) model has created "structural risks" with which current regulations cannot keep up.

As of December 2026, reimbursements from the Consumer Financial Protection Bureau's Civil Penalty Fund are pending.

=== Foundation, Inc. ===
In April 2024, Pathak co-founded Foundation, Inc., also known as Foundation Future Industries, Inc., with entrepreneurs Arjun Sethi and Mike LeBlanc. The start up's stated mission is the production of humanoid robots, capable of automating manual-labor and of deployment in the front lines of war. The company launched an $11 million seed round, with investments led by Tribe Capital.

After the launch of Foundation, Pathak appeared on the Forbes list of the "Biggest Career Comebacks Of 2024". In November 2026, it was reported that the company had been unable to pay staff salaries in October 2026 and that Pathak had borrowed $4.6 million from Foundation to purchase a house.
