= Carta (software company) =

American software company

eShares, Inc.
- Trade name: Carta, Inc.
- Industry: Software
- Founded: 2012; 14 years ago
- Founders: Henry Ward; Manu Kumar
- Headquarters: 333 Bush Street, San Francisco, California, U.S.
- Key people: Henry Ward (CEO); Manu Kumar (Chairman)
- Number of employees: 1,618 (2022)
- Website: carta.com

eShares, Inc., doing business as Carta, Inc., is a San Francisco, California-based technology company that specializes in capitalization table management and valuation software. The company digitizes paper stock certificates along with stock options, warrants, and derivatives to allow companies, investors, and employees to manage their equity and track company ownership. The company also operated CartaX, a private stock exchange, which was shuttered in 2024.

Carta was founded in 2012 by Henry Ward and Manu Kumar.

== History ==
Carta was founded as eShares in 2012 by entrepreneur Henry Ward and serial investor Manu Kumar. Ward became CEO and Kumar became the company's Chairman. The company launched when the founders saw a need for venture-backed companies to electronically manage equity, issue securities, and track their cap tables.

In August 2015 eShares raised a $17 million Series B, led by Spark Capital.

In October 2016 eShares partnered with cloud-based human resources company Zenefits to add equity management to Zenefits' platform.

On September 1, 2017, eShares acquired competitor Silicon Valley Bank's valuation business Silicon Valley Bank Analytics (SVBA). In October Carta raised a $42 million Series C, led by Menlo Ventures and Social Capital. Matt Murphy of Menlo Ventures and Arjun Sethi of Social Capital joined the board of directors. In November, CEO Ward announced in a blog post that eShares would start doing business under a new name, Carta.

In December 2018 Carta raised $80 million in series D and reached a valuation of $800 million, led by Tribe Capital and Meritech Capital Partners.

In May 2019, the company raised $300 million in a Series E round at a $1.7 billion valuation, led by Andreessen Horowitz. In November, the company received coverage for announcing new employee separation policies, including approving departure pay for all employees, while removing separation agreements and legal documents. The company also was one of the first to extend option exercise windows for departing employees, as employees became more concerned about their equity stakes.

In July 2020, former marketing executive Emily Kramer, filed a lawsuit in San Francisco alleging gender discrimination, retaliation, and violation of the California Equal Pay Act. Carta was also covered in the NY Times for their alleged mistreatment of employees in August of 2020.

In 2020, a series F funding round valued the company at $3.1 billion. In 2020, Lisa Whittaker was hired away from the investment bank UBS to clean up what she called Carta's "toxic, boys club" culture.

In January 2021, launched a private stock exchange called CartaX, to allow employees and shareholders to sell private shares before an IPO or acquisition. In February, the company sold just under $100 million of its own stock on CartaX.

In September 2022, Carta acquired UK competitor Capdesk for an undisclosed sum.

In October 2023 a lawsuit was filed in San Francisco by former Carta employee Alexandra Rogers alleging she was groped at a work happy hour event by Chief Revenue Officer Jeff Perry in June 2022. Perry and Carta settled with Rogers in 2025: her suit was the fourth public discrimination-related case settled by the company since 2023.

In 2024, it was reported that the company's valuation had dropped to less than $2 billion, a reduction of about 75% from its 2022 peak.

In May 2026, Carta acquired Avantia, an AI-powered legal and compliance platform for asset managers, and launched Carta Law, integrating legal and compliance workflows with its existing fund operations platform. Carta has raised about $1.2 billion in venture capital since its founding.

== Products and services ==
Carta develops software to help companies maintain their capitalization tables, which show a company's percentages of ownership, equity dilution, and value of equity in each round of investment by founders, investors, and other owners. The company's software also helps customers digitally manage their valuations, portfolio investments and equity plans.

Carta's software allows company founders to issue digital share certificates to investors, employees, and others who qualify for stock options. It also develops a centralized dashboard, for issuers to keep track of stock ownership, the timing and pricing of shares issued, and which owners are willing to sell. Venture firms also use Carta's software to manage their portfolios.

The company also operated the CartaX private stock exchange, a way for employees and shareholders to sell their stocks before the company goes public or is acquired. Business Insider referred to the company "the NASDAQ for private companies" before the exchange was shut down in 2024, following a customer data scandal.

The company's focus on capitalization tables led to a series of equity gap studies called Table Stakes. The reports highlight the equity gaps between employees and founders based on gender, race, ethnicity and geography in a variety of industries, including high tech.

== Operations ==
Carta is headquartered in San Francisco, California. As of August 2022, the company was reportedly tracking over $2.5 trillion in company equity, and had facilitated $13 billion in secondary-market sales. Its customers include Slack, Calendly, and Affirm. Henry Ward is the company's CEO.
