= Spinn Inc. =

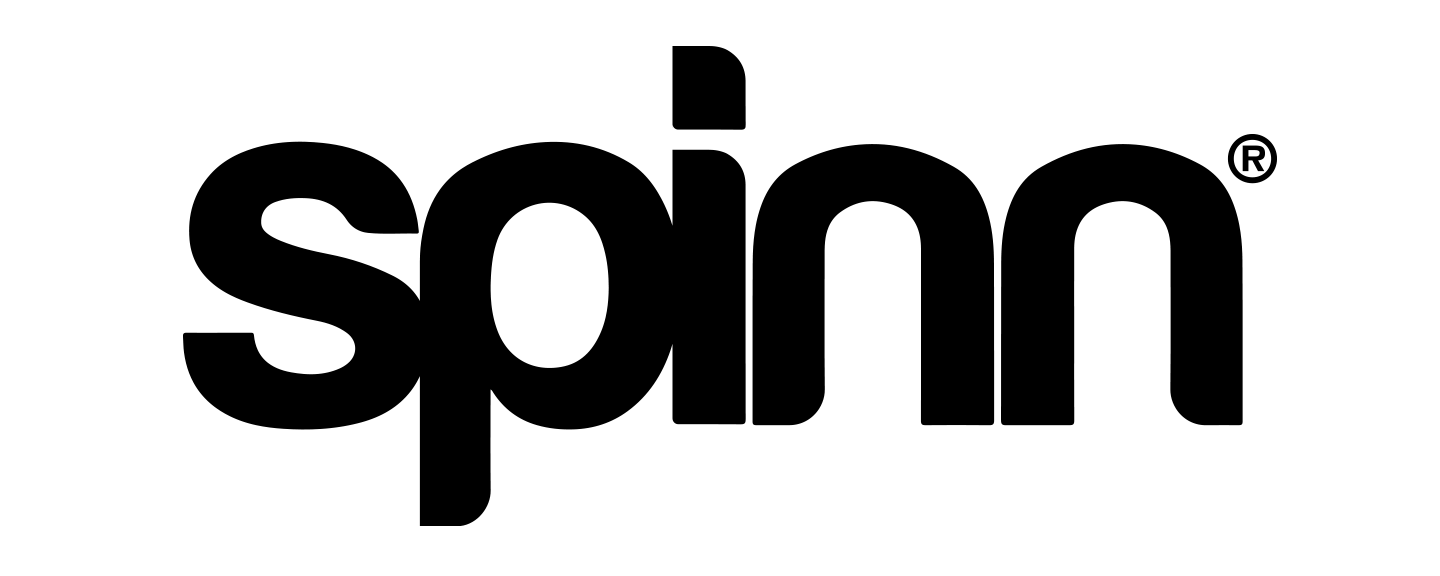
- Industry: Consumer Goods
- Founded: October 2014; 11 years ago
- Founder: Serge de Warrimont, Roland Verbeek, and Roderick de Rode
- Headquarters: San Francisco, California, USA
- Website: https://www.spinn.com

Spinn Inc. is a San Francisco-based coffee-subscription business. The coffee makers from Spinn, are said to be Wi‑Fi–connected and app-controlled, and thus, these are said to demand minimal effort from the users.

== Overview ==
Spinn Inc is a hardware enabled coffee marketplace and was founded in 2015 by Roderick de Rode, Serge de Warrimont and Roland Verbeek.

Spinn is provides its users with a curated coffee roaster platform through which the users are given various choices about their coffee, and this platform is currently said to have over 150 connected roasters for fulfilling the users’ coffee bean orders as of 2017.

== Technology ==
Spinn's coffee maker uses patented centrifugal brewing process and an integrated grinder. The centrifugal technology is said to variable stepless rotating speed between 500 rpm to 8000 rpm, the decides the extraction level, and amount of coffee and water used.

This coffee maker is app-controllable, and every aspect from ordering and brewing to coffee preparation can be controlled through Spinn's proprietary iOS and Android-based mobile application. This app has the Alexa integration feature, which allows the users to talk to their coffee makers.

Spinn began accepting pre-orders for its coffee maker in late 2016 and initially projected shipment in mid-2017. However, the rollout was delayed; limited beta units shipped in 2018, and widespread customer deliveries commenced in 2020. In 2021, Spinn secured a $20 million funding round led by Spark Capital, bringing its total funding to $37 million to date.
