= Scott Klemmer =

American computer scientist

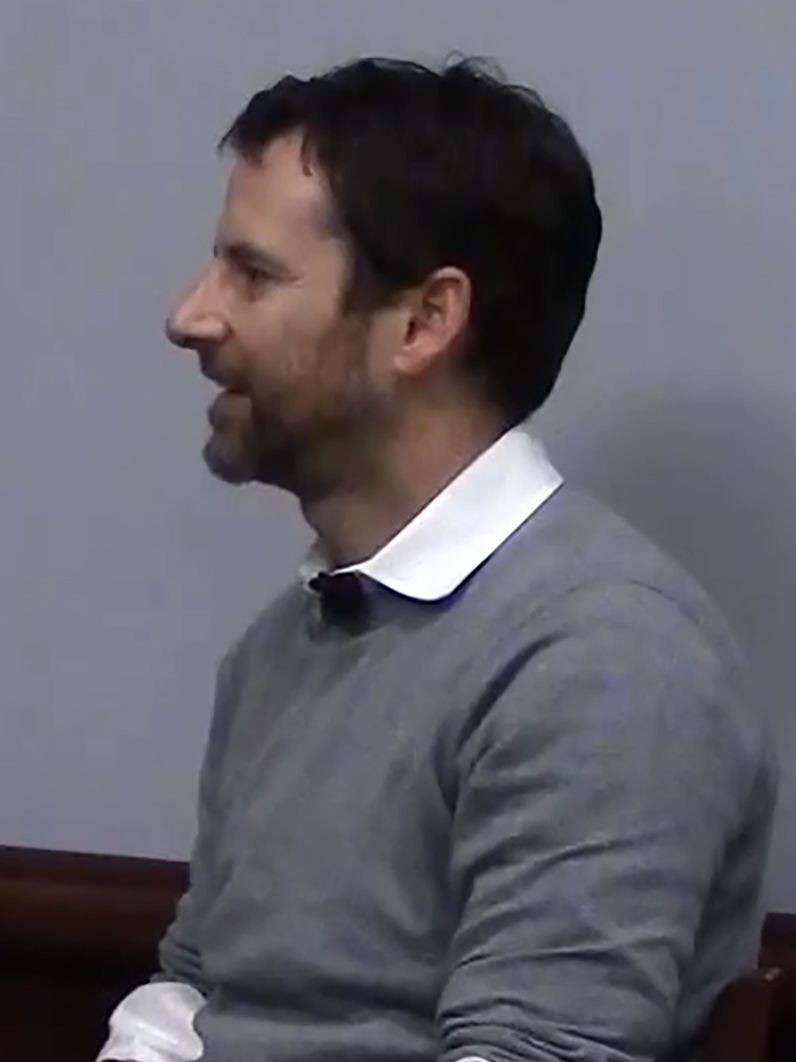
- Education: Brown University; U.C. Berkeley

Scott Klemmer is a human-computer interaction, user-centered design, usability, and computer science researcher and educator. He co-founded the Design Lab with Don Norman and Jim Hollan at the University of California San Diego in 2013. Klemmer is a professor in the Departments of Cognitive Science and Computer Science and Engineering, and formerly at Stanford University. His former advisees include the founders of the unicorn startups Instagram and Instabase.

Klemmer has researched Massive Open Online Courses (MOOC)s, and peer learning and feedback, design thinking, prototyping, iterative design, research ethics and methods, crowdsourcing, and coordination, among other things. He leads the Interaction Design specialization on Coursera.

== Education ==
Klemmer attended Brown University from 1995-1999, and received undergraduate degrees in Art-semiotics and Computer Science. He went on to pursue art and graphic design, and worked in Palo Alto, CA at Interval Research Lab.

He attended the University of California Berkeley, where he received a Masters and completed his PhD in 2004.

== Awards and honors ==
- Katayanagi Emerging Leadership Prize
- Sloan Research Fellowship
- National Science Foundation Career award
- Microsoft Research New Faculty Fellowship
- Editorial board for the ACM Transactions on Computer-Human Interaction (TOCHI)
- Previous program co-chair for UIST, the CHI systems area, and HCIC
