= MessageMe =

Instant messaging software

- Type: Software
- Founded: 2012
- Founders: Arjun Sethi, Alexander Chee, Justin Rosenthal, Vivek Tatineni
- Headquarters: San Francisco, California, United States
- Website: messageme.com

MessageMe was a messaging app and platform for the iPhone and Android. It launched in March 2013 and grew to 5 million users within 3 months. The app allowed users to send and receive videos, photos, stickers, and voice messages in addition to text.

MessageMe was acquired and shutdown by Yahoo in 2014 for a price rumored between $30 million and $40 million.

== History ==
MessageMe was founded in 2012 in by Arjun Sethi, Alexander Chee, Justin Rosenthal and Vivek Tatineni and based out of San Francisco, California. It raised a $1.9 million seed round from First Round Capital, Google Ventures, SV Angel and Andreessen Horowitz, among others.

It launched in March 2013 on iOS and Android and reached 1 million users within 10 days. In May 2013, MessageMe announced that it raised an additional $10 million in funding from Greylock Partners and that Greylock partner John Lilly had joined the board of directors.

MessageMe reached 5 million users within 75 days of launch.

== Controversy ==
Shortly after MessageMe's March 2013 launch, Facebook revoked MessageMe's access to the Facebook Platform's "Find Friends" functionality that allowed MessageMe users to connect to Facebook and find their Facebook friends on MessageMe. Facebook cited its policy that allowed it to revoke access to developers who "replicate[] a core Facebook product or service without [Facebook's] permission." Leaked internal discussions showed that Facebook revoked MessageMe's access over concern that MessageMe was becoming too popular and competitive with Facebook messaging.

In an internal March 2013 email thread, Justin Osofsky, former Facebook director of platform partnerships, wrote:

In the first week after launch, MessageMe actually didn't make any friends.get calls. However, MessageMe is now up to ~350K MAU and made 333K friends calls last week. We will restrict their access to friends.get shortly. In terms of next steps, Monika is working with Mike Nowak to see if there are any other messenger apps which have hit the growth team's radar recently. If so, we'd like to restrict them at the same time to group this into one press cycle.

In 2018, the question of Facebook's use of platform data in anticompetitive ways against companies like MessageMe, Vine and Voxer resurfaced as part of the Facebook–Cambridge Analytica data scandal. At the same time that Facebook cut off data to apps like MessageMe, it shared private user data with important Facebook partners like Amazon, Netflix and Spotify.

In December 2018, Facebook officially ended the platform policy it used to revoke MessageMe's platform access.

== Features ==
MessageMe along with WhatsApp, Kik and others led the movement of mobile messaging in the United States away from text-based SMS and towards richer text messaging which included audio, video, doodles, stickers, location and more in addition to text. Global startups that led this trend included WeChat in China, Line in Japan, and KakaoTalk in Korea.

Messaging apps like MessageMe, Path and Lango were the first to bring stickers to the United States mobile messaging market. Line's success with stickers in Asia inspired those apps to bring stickers to the United States. MessageMe offered free and paid sticker packs that could be purchased through the app.

== Acquisition ==
Yahoo acquired MessageMe for between $30 million and $40 million in October 2014. Other potential acquirers were Snapchat and Truecaller.

The acquisition happened as part of CEO Marissa Mayer's strategy of reinvigorating legacy products by acquiring top startup talent via small acquisitions. Yahoo bought startups like MessageMe, shut down their products and then put those teams to work on existing or new Yahoo products.

In July 2015, Yahoo launched its first mobile messaging app, Livetext, which was built internally by the MessageMe team on top of MessageMe technology. Yahoo shut down Livetext in March 2016.
