= Kraken (cryptocurrency exchange) =

US-based cryptocurrency exchange

Payward, Inc.
- Trade name: Kraken
- Type: Private
- Industry: Financial services; Cryptocurrency
- Founded: July 28, 2011; 15 years ago
- Founder: Jesse Powell
- Headquarters: San Francisco, California, U.S.
- Key people: Arjun Sethi (co-CEO); Dave Ripley (co-CEO)
- Products: Cryptocurrency exchange; Electronic funds transfer
- Parent: Payward, Inc.
- Website: kraken.com

Kraken (legally named Payward, Inc.) is a US-based cryptocurrency exchange, founded in 2011. It is the first cryptocurrency company to obtain a bank charter. In 2025, Kraken began allowing the trading of tokenized equities by non-US customers.

By 2025, it had $207 billion in quarterly trading volume and was ranked the world's fourteenth-largest crypto exchange. Beyond cryptocurrencies, in most US states the exchange also facilitates the trading of stocks, futures, and ETFs.

== History ==
=== Founding and early development (2011–2014) ===
Kraken was founded in 2011 in San Francisco by Thanh Luu, Michael Gronager, and Jesse Powell, the latter of whom had previously founded an internet gaming startup. Before co-founding Kraken, in 2011 Powell consulted for Mt. Gox, an early bitcoin exchange in Japan, to help it recover from a hacking attack. After observing a number of security issues at Mt. Gox, Powell began working on an alternative exchange with security controls as its foundation. Kraken was co-founded in July 2011, with Payward as its parent company. Kraken then launched publicly in September 2013, initially offering bitcoin, Litecoin, and euro trades before adding additional currencies and margin trading.

In March 2014, Kraken received a $5 million series A investment from Hummingbird Ventures and Bitcoin Opportunity Fund. A month later, Kraken became one of the first bitcoin exchanges to have its data included on Bloomberg Terminal. The Mt. Gox crypto exchange went bankrupt in 2014 after a security breach, and in the following two months Kraken's user base grew by 50%. Due to avoiding security breaches, Kraken was chosen by the Mt. Gox bankruptcy trustees to assist with liquidating the company, investigating lost bitcoins, and helping pay back creditors.

=== Expansion and acquisitions (2015–2020) ===
In 2015, Kraken became the first exchange to list Ethereum's ether coin. Kraken then opened the first dark pool for bitcoins in June 2015. In January 2016, Kraken purchased Coinsetter, a bitcoin exchange based in New York City, and Cavirtex, Canada's first bitcoin exchange. It fully absorbed both brands, with client accounts automatically transferred over to Kraken. In February 2016, Kraken acquired both the Dutch exchange CleverCoin and Glidera, a cryptocurrency wallet service. Also that February, SBI Group led a series B investment round into Kraken.

Kraken acquired Cryptowatch, a charting and trading platform, in March 2017, and, by December 2017, Kraken claimed to be registering up to 50,000 new users a day. It announced closure of its services in Japan in April 2018, citing rising costs of doing business; it returned to the Japanese market in 2020. In February 2019, Kraken acquired Crypto Facilities, a British derivatives trading firm. In June 2019, Kraken received $13.5 million from 2,263 individual investors via a special-purpose vehicle. In September 2020, Kraken Financial was granted a special purpose depository institution (SPDI) charter in Wyoming, becoming the first cryptocurrency exchange to hold a bank charter in the United States.

=== Global operations (2021–2023) ===
Kraken had 6 million clients by early 2021, with the platform allowing trades in 60 digital assets and seven traditional currencies. Kraken released a mobile app for international users in January 2021, which became available in the United States that June. Also in 2021, Kraken acquired Staked, a non-custodial staking platform. In early 2021, Kraken sought additional funding from investors at a valuation of over $20 billion, with Tribe Capital becoming the company's second largest institutional investor behind Hummingbird Ventures, and Arjun Sethi being appointed to the board of directors. With a valuation over $1 billion, Kraken became classified as a unicorn company. In April 2023, Dave Ripley—then chief operating officer—replaced Powell as CEO, with Powell becoming chairman.

The company closed operations in Japan for the second time in February 2023, citing market conditions and a weak global crypto market. Kraken closed its Abu Dhabi office in February 2023 as well, after securing a license to operate in the UAE less than a year prior. In May 2023, Kraken's chief legal officer testified before Congress on legislative and regulatory issues related to crypto markets. After Kraken launched a beta version of its non-fungible token (NFT) marketplace in November 2022, it officially launched NFT trading in June 2023, with users able to pay for listings via fiat or cryptocurrency. In September 2023, Bloomberg reported that Kraken planned to trade outside cryptocurrency for the first time, and would begin offering trading in US-listed stocks and exchange-traded funds. Kraken expanded in Europe during 2023, adding virtual asset service provider (VASP) licenses in Ireland, Italy, and Spain. In October 2023, Kraken acquired the Netherlands-based crypto-exchange Coin Meester B.V. (BCM).

=== Diversification (2024–present) ===
In March 2024, Kraken introduced a dedicated division for institutional investors, Kraken Institutional. Shortly after the launch, they also released the Kraken Wallet, a multi-chain crypto wallet supporting eight blockchains. In October 2024, the company laid off 15% of its workers, or around 400 of the company's 2,600 employees. Arjun Sethi was named co-CEO along with Dave Ripley. In November 2024, Kraken and a consortium of crypto firms launched the Global Dollar Network, a joint stablecoin pegged to the US dollar. At the end of 2024, Kraken had 2.6 million funded accounts, with $42.8 billion in assets held on the platform. Its revenue doubled that year to $1.5 billion, with adjusted annual earnings of $380 million.

In March 2025, it was reported that Kraken, as Payward Inc., was planning for an early 2026 IPO. In April 2025, Kraken began offering a version of its trading platform, named Embed, to financial service companies. Bunq, a European digital bank based in Amsterdam, was the first to use the service, which allows financial institutions to give their clients access to crypto trading. In 2025, along with the company AlpacaDB, Kraken began offering commission-free trading in New Jersey, Connecticut, Wyoming and Rhode Island, with plans to expand to other markets.

In May 2025, the company acquired NinjaTrader, a retail futures trading platform, for $1.5 billion in an effort to expand into multiple asset classes and grow its user base. Reuters reported that the deal highlighted "the deepening ties between crypto companies and traditional financial firms as digital assets gain wider acceptance." Kraken launched its regulated crypto derivatives offering in Europe on May 20, 2025, after having acquired a license in Cyprus earlier that year. That month, it announced it would launch trading in "tokenized equities" for non-US customers, with stock in companies such as Apple, Tesla, and Nvidia to be tradable on its digital ledger. The feature went live in June. In October 2025, Kraken announced that it acquired the Small Exchange from IG Group. Previously, IG Group had acquired the exchange from Foris DAX Markets in April 2023. Kraken's website in early 2025 listed $207 billion in quarterly trading volume. With 15 million users, its accounts facilitated buying and selling in 560 cryptocurrencies, as well as the trading of 11,000 stocks and ETFs in certain US states, and was ranked the world's fourteenth-largest crypto exchange.

In March 2025, Kraken's parent company Payward partnered with Nasdaq to develop tokenization infrastructure aimed at enabling blockchain-based trading of financial assets.

It was announced in April 2026 that Kraken agreed to acquire derivatives company Bitnomial for $550 million, expected to close by June 2026. Trade publication Banking Dive reported that Bitnomial markets itself as the first U.S. crypto-native business to hold all three Commodity Futures Trading Commission-issued licenses required to operate a brokerage, exchange, and a clearinghouse.

== Controversies ==
=== Government regulator investigations ===
Kraken formally left the New York jurisdiction in August 2015, citing in part the state's BitLicense. In April 2018, Kraken declined a request for information by the New York Attorney General's Office, which was studying the measures taken by cryptocurrency exchanges to protect customers from market manipulation and money laundering. In its refusal, Kraken cited costs associated with compiling the information, also noting it had left the New York market due to the state being "hostile" to crypto. Later that year, the New York attorney general released a report suggesting "customers would do well to avoid platforms" that hadn't contributed to the report, as the platforms could be violating New York law, and referred Kraken, along with Binance and Gate.io, to New York State Department of Financial Services for potential violation of local virtual currency regulations.

After Kraken self-reported potential violations, in March 2019 the exchange was investigated by the Office of Foreign Assets Control for potential violation of sanction-regimes by allowing trade with customers based in Iran. A settlement was reached in November 2022, with Kraken paying a fine of $362,000 and agreeing to "invest an additional $100,000 in certain sanctions compliance controls." In late September 2021, Kraken agreed to pay a fine of $1.25 million to settle claims by the Commodity Futures Trading Commission that it had offered unregistered margin trading.

The Australian Securities and Investments Commission (ASIC) initiated civil proceedings in 2023 against Bit Trade, Kraken's operator in Australia, for "failing to comply" with margin trading rules. In August 2024, Australia's Federal Court ordered Bit Trade to pay a A$8 million ($5.1 million) fine for incorrectly issuing a credit facility to 1,100 customers.

In February 2023, the Securities and Exchange Commission (SEC) categorized Kraken's staking service as an illegal sale of securities. Kraken agreed to a $30-million settlement without admitting or denying the allegations, and agreed to cease offering its staking service in the US. Its international staking services stayed in place. In 2025, Kraken introduced a new staking product for a number of US states.

The SEC sued Kraken in November 2023 in the case SEC v Payward Inc et al, U.S. District Court, Northern District of California, No. 23-06003. The SEC alleged that Kraken had been operating as a securities exchange without registering as such. Kraken was also accused of mixing customer assets with its own funds, which Kraken denied. Kraken argued that they did not list securities and there was no US law requiring the registration of crypto exchanges. The SEC agreed to drop the lawsuit in March 2025, no longer seeking to regulate the company as a stock exchange.

=== Identifying Glassdoor reviewers ===
In May 2019, Kraken filed a motion in California's Marin County Superior Court attempting to identify ten anonymous reviewers on Glassdoor. Kraken wanted to sue them for allegedly breaching their severance contract. The Electronic Frontier Foundation, saying it represented the anonymous reviewers, claimed in 2020 that identifying the reviewers would harm their First Amendment free-speech rights and have a chilling effect on the expression of others. In 2022, the court ordered Glassdoor to disclose the real identity of some reviewers.

=== Work culture and layoffs ===
In 2019, Powell suggested that parenting was a distraction to being productive and critiqued the economic viability of parental leaves; he went on to question whether choosing to not abide by relevant governmental regulations was a risk worth taking. In June 2022, Powell urged employees in a work meeting to reject the usage of preferred gender pronouns; he then opened a Slack channel to debate whether people should be allowed to choose their gender but not their race or ethnicity. The next day, Kraken released a "culture document" which outlined the libertarian values that it asserted were to be obeyed at work. Among other things, employees were prohibited from labelling others' comments as "toxic, hateful, racist", etc., and particular emphasis was assigned on how "offensiveness" was not forbidden. Powell and his fellow executives encouraged employees who disagreed with the policy to quit, and offered four months' severance for those who opted to do so.

In November 2022, Kraken laid off about 1,100 employees –approximately 30 percent of its workforce. In October 2024, Kraken laid off about 15 percent of staff.

== Sponsorship ==
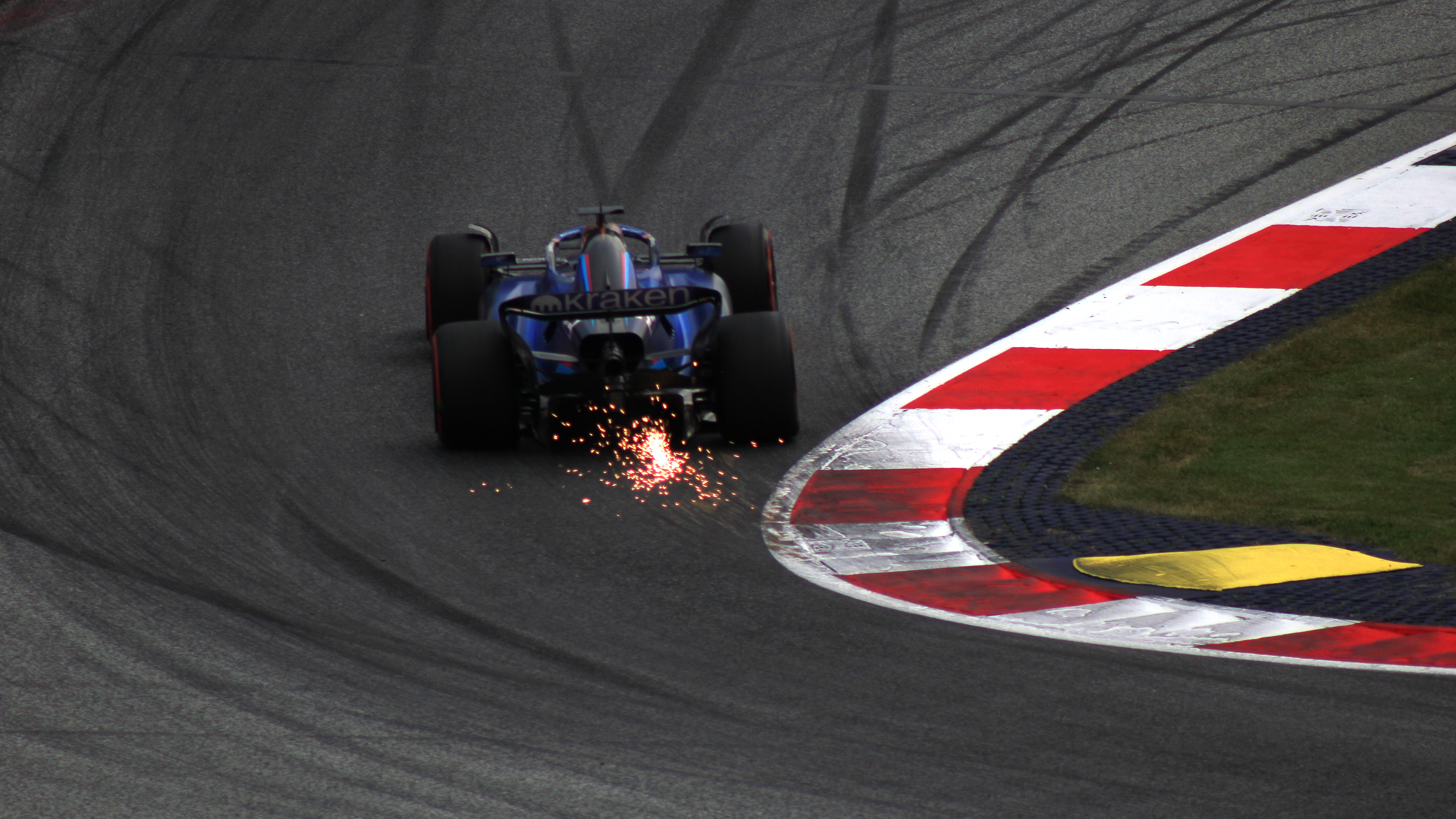
Kraken sponsorship on the Williams FW45 Formula 1 Car

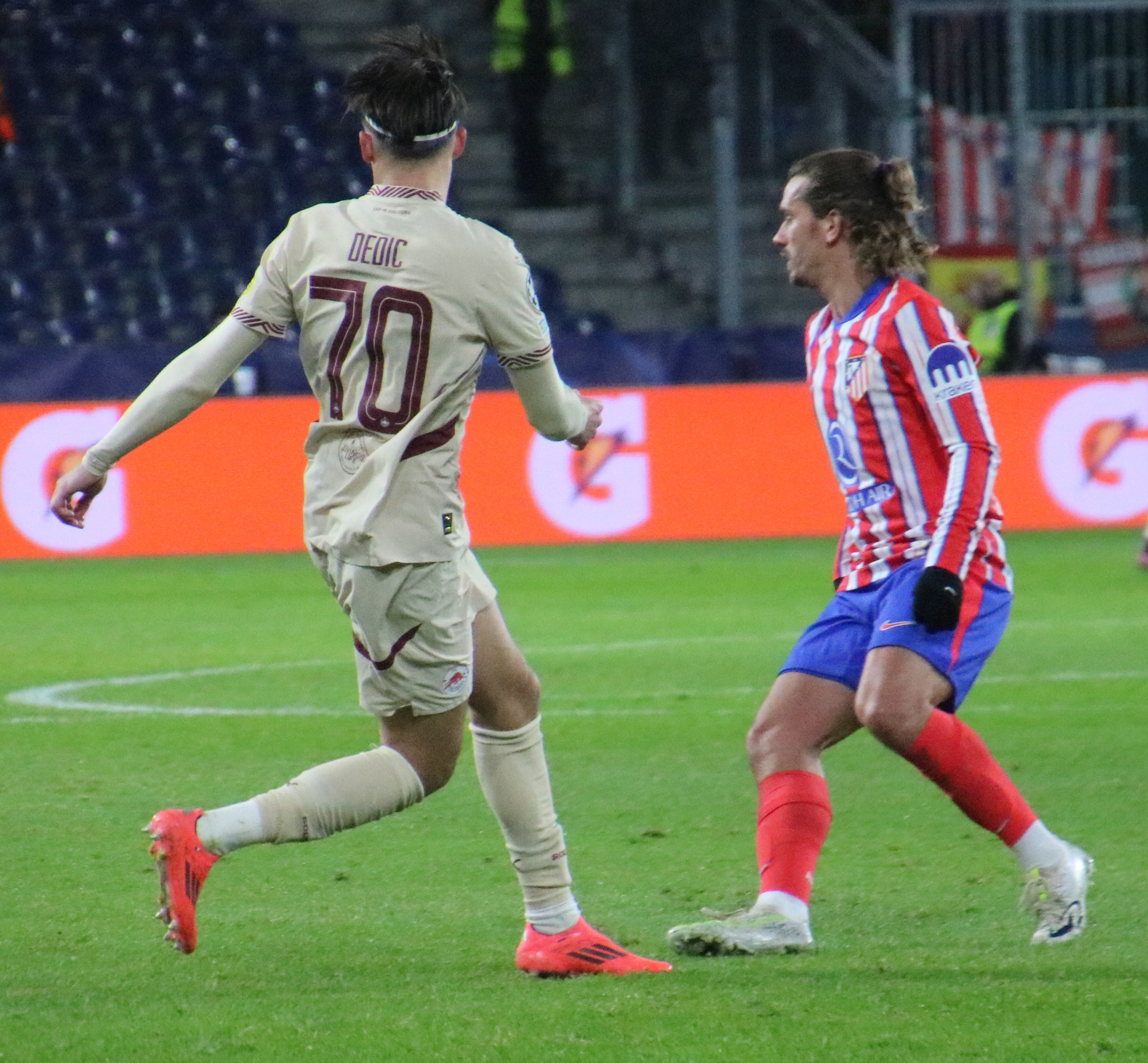
Kraken sponsorship seen on the sleeve of the 2024-25 Atlético Madrid football kit

=== Formula 1 ===
Beginning in March 2023, Kraken became the official crypto and Web3 partner of the Williams Racing Formula 1 team. In October 2024, the partnership was extended through the 2025 Formula 1 season, with expanded branding on the FW47 car's halo, as well as on the drivers' race suits, helmets, and team apparel.

=== Association football ===
In July 2024, Kraken announced that the would become the sleeve sponsor for English Premier League football club Tottenham Hotspur and Spanish La Liga club Atlético Madrid. In August, Kraken announced they would be the sleeve sponsor for German Bundesliga club RB Leipzig.

== See also ==
- Economics of bitcoin
- Gemini
- List of cryptocurrency exchanges
- List of bitcoin companies
