= Mamoon Hamid =

Pakistani-American venture capitalist

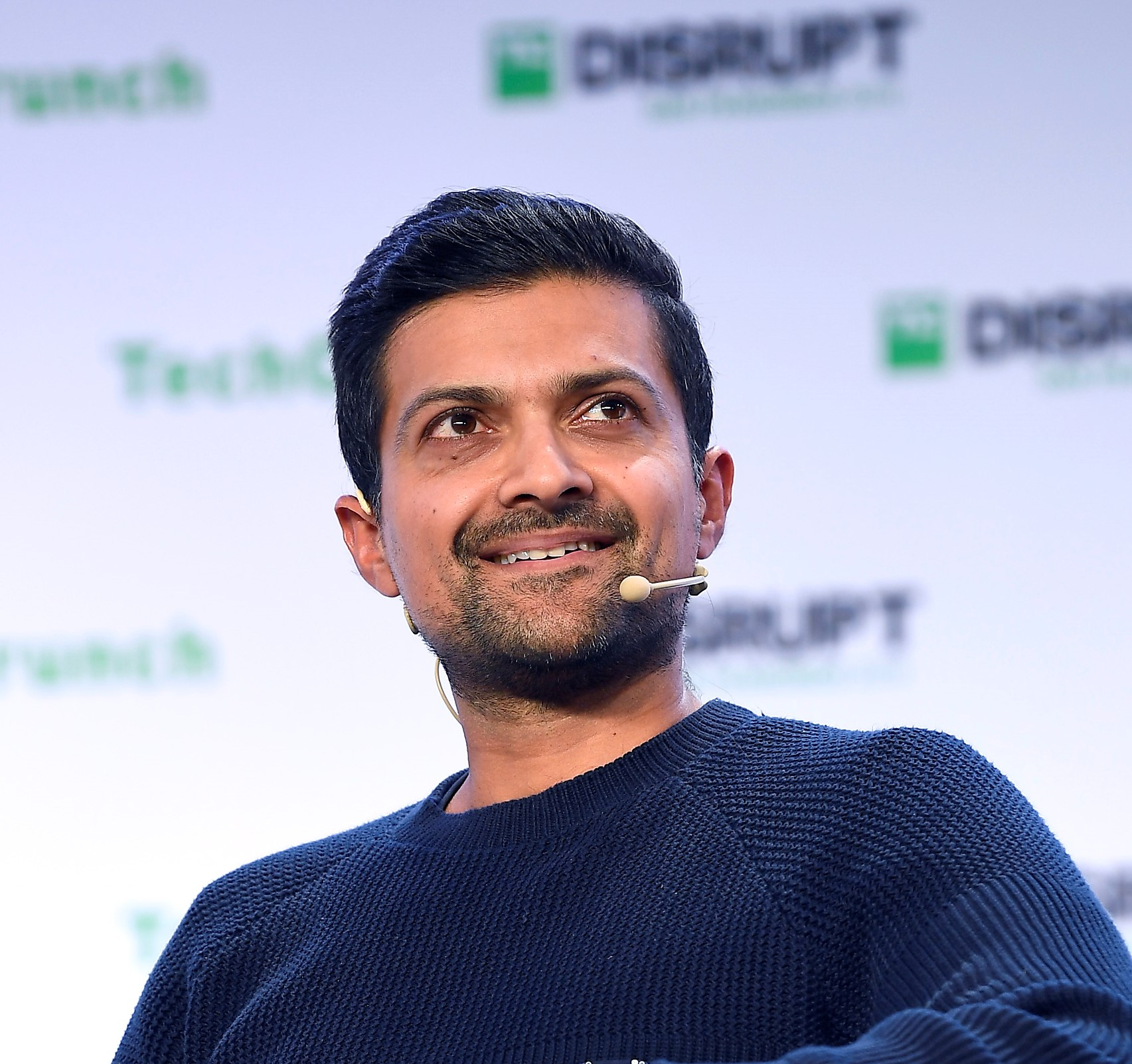
- Hamid in 2019
- Born: 1978 (age 47–48); Pakistan
- Citizenship: United States and Germany
- Education: Purdue University; Stanford University; Harvard Business School
- Occupation: Venture capitalist
- Employer: Kleiner Perkins
- Title: Managing Member and General Partner
- Website: Profile at Kleiner Perkins

Mamoon Hamid (born 1978) is a Pakistani-German-American venture capitalist currently serving as a Managing Member and General Partner at the venture capital firm Kleiner Perkins.

== Early life ==
Hamid was born in Pakistan and grew up in Frankfurt, Germany. He moved to the United States to attend Purdue University, earning a bachelor's degree in electrical engineering in 1997. He subsequently earned a master's degree from Stanford University and an MBA from Harvard Business School.

== Career ==
=== Xilinx and USVP ===
Early in his career he held various business and engineering roles at Xilinx, and he subsequently joined U.S. Venture Partners (USVP) in 2005, where he led early-stage investments in startups such as Yammer and Box.

=== Social Capital ===
In 2011, he co-founded the investment firm Social Capital where he led investments in companies such as Intercom, Greenhouse, Netskope, and Front, and was the first outside investor in the unicorn startup Slack.

=== Kleiner Perkins ===
He became a Managing Member and General Partner at Kleiner Perkins in August 2017.

He first appeared on Forbes's Midas List of top tech investors in 2014. As of August 2017, he had appeared on the list three times. In 2017, he ranked No. 76 among the Top 100 VCs named by Electronics Weekly and No. 61 among the Top 100 Venture Capitalists named by CB Insights and The New York Times.

== Public involvement ==
As chairman of the Institute for Constitutional Advocacy and Protection, Hamid organized a private fundraiser for the institute the day after President Donald Trump signed Executive Order 13769 on January 27, 2017. The event raised funding for the institute to challenge the Trump administration's policies in court.

== Personal life ==
Hamid lives in Palo Alto, California.

== See also ==
- Social Capital (venture capital)
- Legal challenges to the Trump travel ban
