= Instabase =

Technology company

Instabase, Inc
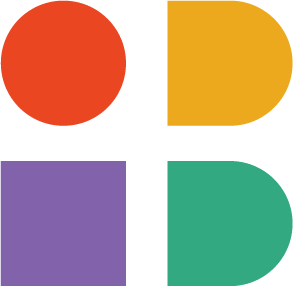
- Type: Private
- Industry: Software
- Founded: 2015
- Founder: Anant Bhardwaj
- Headquarters: San Francisco, California, United States
- Number of locations: San Francisco, New York, London, and Bangalore
- Area served: Worldwide
- Website: instabase.com

Instabase, Inc is a technology company headquartered in San Francisco. The company provides an applied AI platform that is used to automate business processes.

== History ==
Instabase was founded by Anant Bhardwaj in 2015, when he was a PhD student at the Massachusetts Institute of Technology. At MIT, he met several influential mentors who encouraged him to pursue different research projects — one of these projects eventually became Instabase. In July 2015, he dropped out of the PhD program, and moved to San Francisco to raise capital. Greylock Partners and New Enterprise Associates were the first investors in the company.

In 2017, then a 4-person company, Instabase largely remained in the stealth mode when Martin Casado from Andreessen Horowitz led the Series A. At that time, CNBC reported that Instabase is building a "social network for data".

In 2019, for the first time Instabase officially disclosed its product offerings and customers in an interview with Bloomberg TV. Bhardwaj in the interview provided details on how the software platform powered by Artificial Intelligence is helping financial services enterprises such as large banks and insurance companies build customizable workflows for automating their critical business processes such as Invoice Processing, Lending, Know your customer (KYC), and Client Onboarding.

=== Pivot to deep learning and transformers ===
In 2020, Instabase heavily invested in transformer-based layout-aware language models and creating pre-trained base foundation models which its customers could fine-tune according to their specific requirements in-house. In 2021, Instabase disclosed that its AI platform has fully migrated to using transformer based deep learning architecture under the hood, and announced the launch of several pre-trained base foundation models included as part of the platform, which could be used for understanding any content as part of building workflows for automating business processes.

=== AI Hub ===
In 2023, Instabase announced that it is incorporating Large Language Models in its product with a public launch of AI Hub, a repository of AI apps focused on content understanding and a set of Generative AI based tools for building AI applications. In an interview with Bloomberg TV, Instabase founder Anant Bhardwaj also discussed their partnership with OpenAI and use of their GPT 3.5 and GPT 4 models.

== Funding ==
On August 31, 2015 The Wall Street Journal reported that Instabase had raised $3.75 million from Greylock Partners and New Enterprise Associates to build a cloud based hub for running data applications.

On June 14, 2017, CNBC reported that Instabase raised a $23.2 million Series A led by Martin Casado of Andreessen Horowitz to build social network for data.

On Oct 21, 2019, Bloomberg News reported that Instabase has raised a Series B of $105 million, led by Index Ventures and joined by Spark Capital, Tribe Capital, SC Ventures, and Glynn Capital, which valued the company at over $1 billion. On the same day, Instabase founder Anant Bhardwaj and Sarah Cannon (a partner at Index Ventures) appeared on Bloomberg TV to discuss the details of what the company does and who are its customers.

On June 6, 2023, Bloomberg News reported that Instabase has doubled its valuation to $2B in its latest round of Series C, and the launch of AI Hub, a generative AI based platform for content understanding. In an interview with Bloomberg TV, Instabase founder Anant Bhardwaj discussed the launch of AI Hub, the current macro environment, and their partnership with OpenAI.

== Acquisitions ==
On February 14, 2018, Instabase announced that it had acquired Cloudstitch, a web development platform that uses spreadsheets as the back-end.
