= Impermium =

Cyber-security company

Impermium was a cyber-security startup company based in Redwood City, California, which provided anti-spam and account protection services for Internet websites. In 2014, the company was acquired by Google.

== History ==
The company was founded in 2010 by Mark Risher, Vishwanath Ramarao, and Naveen Jamal, who met while managing the anti-spam systems for Yahoo! Mail.

The company protected more than 1.5 million sites worldwide, including Disqus, Livefyre, Pinterest, Squarespace, and Tumblr from attacks including fraudulent registrations, login and account hijacking, malicious user-generated content, and other forms of Social spam. Impermium received venture capital financing from funds including Accel Partners, Greylock Partners, Highland Capital Partners, Morado Ventures, and the Social+Capital Partnership.

In January 2014, Google announced the acquisition of the company, merging its team and technology into its own anti-spam group.

== See also ==
- List of Google Acquisitions
