= Wave Financial =

Canadian financial services provider

Wave Financial Inc.
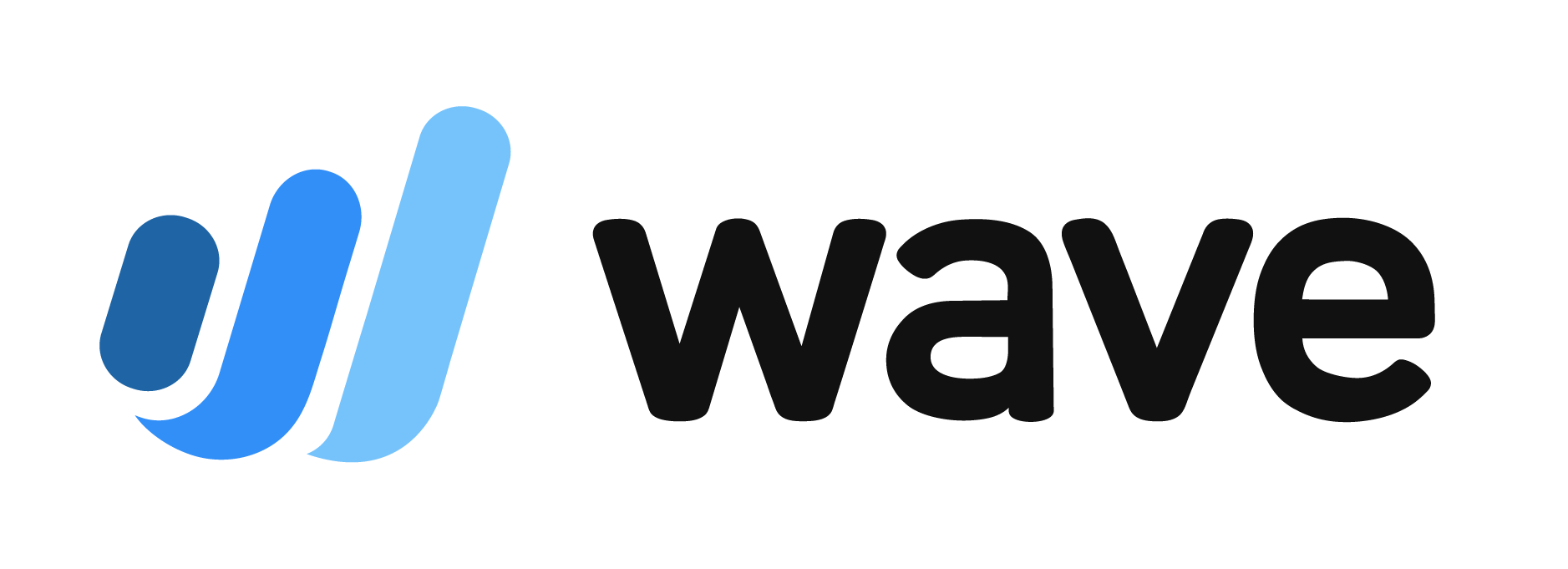
- Type: Private
- Industry: Small business software and financial services
- Founded: 2009; 17 years ago in Canada
- Headquarters: Toronto, Canada
- Key people: Zahir Khoja (CEO), Kirk Simpson (co-founder and CEO), James Lochrie (co-founder); Les Whiting (Chief Financial Services Officer)
- Owner: H&R Block
- Number of employees: 370 (Jan 2023)
- Website: www.waveapps.com

Wave is a Canadian company that provides financial services and software for small businesses. Wave is headquartered in the East Bayfront neighbourhood in Toronto, Canada.

The company's first product was free online accounting software designed for businesses with 1–9 employees, followed by invoicing, personal finance and receipt-scanning software (OCR). In 2012, Wave began branching into financial services, initially with Payments by Wave (credit card processing) and Payroll by Wave, followed in February 2017 by Lending by Wave, which has since been discontinued.

== History ==
CEO Kirk Simpson and CPO James Lochrie launched Wave Accounting Inc. in July 2009, Wave Accounting launched to the public on November 16, 2010. In June 2011, Series A funding led by OMERS Ventures was closed. In September 2011, FedDev Ontario invested one million dollars in funding. In October 2011, a $5-million investment led by U.S. venture capital firm Charles River Ventures was announced. In May 2012, Wave Accounting closed its series B financing round led by The Social+Capital Partnership, with follow-on participation from Charles River Ventures and OMERS Ventures.

Wave acquired a company called Small Payroll in November 2011, which was later launched as a payroll product called Wave Payroll. In February 2012, Wave officially launched Wave Payroll to the public in Canada, followed by the American release in November of the same year.

In August, 2012, the company announced the acquisition of Vuru.co, an online stock-tracking service. Terms of the deal were not disclosed.

In December 2012, the company rebranded itself as Wave to emphasize its broadened spectrum of services.

On March 14, 2019, the company acquired Every, a Toronto-based fintech company that provides business accounts and debit cards to small businesses.

On June 11, 2019, the company announced it was being acquired by tax preparation company, H&R Block, for $537 million.

On June 15, 2022, Wave announced that Kirk Simpson would be leaving and being replaced as CEO by Zahir Khoja.

In May 2025, US customers of Wave were transitioned to a new Payroll processing system supported by CheckHQ. The new integration improved support for US employers by handling employer tax withholding and payments in all 50 US States.

== Products ==
The company's initial product, Accounting by Wave, is a double entry accounting tool. Services include direct bank data imports, invoicing and expense tracking, customizable chart of accounts, and journal transactions. Accounting by Wave integrates with expense tracking software Shoeboxed and e-commerce website Etsy.

The next product launched was Payroll by Wave, which was launched in 2012 after the acquisition of SmallPayroll.ca. Payroll by Wave is only available in the US and Canada.

Invoicing by Wave is an offshoot of the company's earlier accounting tools.

Additional products launched on or shortly after the company's rebrand in December 2012 include:

- a credit card processing tool, Payments by Wave, built initially on integration with Stripe credit card processing. However, Wave does not report merchant fees correctly for countries where Stripe charges a tax such as GST. In these cases, the merchant fees are reported without tax and do not match your Stripe account.
- a receipt scanning tool, Receipts by Wave.

In 2017, Wave signed an agreement to provide its platform on RBC's online business banking site. The RBC-Wave service will be co-branded.

== Taxes supported ==
The company's software supports tax-exclusive pricing, such as U.S. sales tax, where taxes are added on top of prices quoted. This has two effects:

- When scanning receipts users must manually add the tax, and input the amount.
- When making an invoice, users must put in a price before tax, and the system will add the tax on top.

This makes Wave unable to handle taxes in countries like Australia where prices must be quoted inclusive of all taxes, such as GST. There is no way to set an invoice total and have Wave calculate the tax portion as a percentage.

== Pricing and business model ==
As of June 10, 2024, Wave offers two tiers for its software: a free Starter plan with limitations on some features, and a paid Pro plan.

In addition to its paid plan, revenue from the company comes from other paid financial services the company offers:

- Payments by Wave: Card processing which includes debit, credit and prepaid cards as well as ACH (bank payments) in the United States. Fees are a percentage of the transaction.
- Payroll by Wave: Monthly subscription fee plus usage fees.

Wave previously included advertising on its pages as a source of revenue. Advertising was removed in January 2017.

In 2017, Wave raised US$24m in funding led by NAB Ventures. In 2019, H&R Block announced the acquisition of Wave in a cash deal worth US$405 million.

== See also ==
- Accounting software
- Comparison of accounting software
- List of free and open-source software packages
- Web application
