= Klemmer (surname) =

Klemmer is a surname. Notable people with the surname include:

- David Klemmer (born 1993), Australian professional rugby league footballer
- Grover Klemmer (1921–2015) was an American athlete
- John Klemmer (born 1946), American saxophonist, composer, songwriter and arranger
- Phil Klemmer, American television writer and producer
- Scott Klemmer, American computer scientist
