= AlpacaDB =

US financial services company

AlpacaDB Inc.
- Alpaca's official logo
- Type: Private
- Industry: Financial technology
- Founded: 2015; 11 years ago
- Founders: Yoshi Yokokawa and Hitoshi Harada
- Headquarters: San Mateo, California, United States
- Area served: Internationally (availability varies by region)
- Number of employees: 200+ (2025)
- Subsidiaries: Alpaca Securities (US); Alpaca Crypto (US); AlpacaJapan (Japan); AlpacaX Securities and; AlpacaX Crypto (Bahamas)
- Website: alpaca.markets

AlpacaDB Inc. (herein referred to as "Alpaca") is an American financial technology company headquartered in Silicon Valley that provides an API for stock, options, fixed income, and crypto trading for institutions and individual traders to build financial applications. This functionality lets developers process know-your-customer (KYC) verification as well as the trading of stocks, exchange-traded funds (ETFs), options, and cryptocurrencies. Alpaca also offers securities lending, and provides brokerage functionality and market data that comply with regulatory requirements.

== History ==
Alpaca was co-founded in 2015 by Yoshi Yokokawa and Hitoshi Harada. In its early years the company focused on building technology for processing and analyzing large market data sets and developed an open-source time-series database called MarketStore before expanding into brokerage APIs.

Yokokawa pivoted Alpaca in 2018 to a platform that would handle banking, security and regulatory complexities through APIs. Part of this pivot included the registration of Alpaca Securities LLC in March 2017, and FINRA approval occurring in 2018.

Investor-backed funding began in 2018 with $3 million in pre-series A funding and the company took part in Y Combinator's Winter 2019 (W19) batch. By April 2025, the company had raised more than $170 million, backed by investors such as Portage Ventures, Spark Capital, Social Leverage, and Y Combinator. During its Series C round in which it secured $52 million, Alpaca opened a New York office and expanded into the Middle East, Europe, and Asia.

Several Fintech firms and investment platforms have built their services on Alpaca’s APIs. For example, Gotrade uses Alpaca’s Broker API providing users in many countries with access to access to stocks, exchange-traded funds, options and fixed income. In 2025, cryptocurrency exchange Kraken used Alpaca’s Broker API to introduce U.S. stock and ETF trading to its users, enabling fractional shares with low-latency execution and no commission.

The no-code platform Composer, employs Alpaca’s Trading API where users design, backtest, and run algorithmic strategies without writing code. In 2025, Alpaca also announced partnerships with regional investment apps such as ZAD, a Kuwait-based provider of Shariah-compliant investing services, and Manzil Invest USA, a platform with faith-aligned portfolios for American Muslims, both of which use the Broker API for trade execution and account infrastructure.

== Structure ==
AlpacaDB, Inc. is the primary corporate entity and the company operates globally through several subsidiaries such as:

- Alpaca Securities LLC ("Alpaca Securities"), a member FINRA/SIPC
- Alpaca Crypto LLC ("Alpaca Crypto"), a FinCEN registered money services business (NMLS# 2160858) for cryptocurrency services
- AlpacaJapan Co., Ltd, a Kinsho under Kanto Local Finance Bureau Director (#3024) and a JSDA member

Alpaca is a member of the Depository Trust and Clearing Corporation (DTCC), Options Clearing Corporation (OCC), and Fixed Income Clearing Corporation (FICC). Alpaca supports millions of brokerage accounts and has several hundred client partnerships in dozens of countries. The company holds several licenses with financial regulators including the United States Securities and Exchange Commission (SEC), Financial Industry Regulatory Authority (FINRA), Money Services Business (MSB), Securities Commission of the Bahamas, and Japan Securities Dealers Association (JSDA).

== Products ==
Alpaca's business model has several revenue streams including payment for order flow, commission fees, margin interest, cash management spreads, and API usage fees from enterprise clients.

Alpaca's documentation lists five APIs for developers to interact with their platform and their GitHub site provides SDKs for a number of programming languages.

The platform's underlying Order Management System (OMS), is said to handle order processing transactions in milliseconds.
