= State Compensation Insurance Fund =

State Compensation Insurance Fund (State Fund) is a workers' compensation insurer that was created as a "public enterprise fund" by the U.S. state of California, and today has partial autonomy from the rest of the state government. It has regional offices all over California, including Pleasanton, Glendale, San Diego, Redding, Fresno, Bakersfield, Eureka, Vacaville, Rohnert Park, Pasadena, and Sacramento.

State Fund is the second largest California writer of workers’ compensation insurance and has played a central role in the state’s workers’ compensation industry for 110 years. It plays a unique and stabilizing role in the state's economy and it was California’s sole workers’ compensation insurance carrier before the open market was created in the 1990s.

State Fund continues to be fundamentally different than other workers’ compensation carriers due to its state-regulated role in the industry:

- Its revenue is generated solely by premium and investment income, without support from taxpayers or public funds.
- It’s a public enterprise and not-for-profit, focusing its resources on policyholders and their injured workers.
- It accepts applications from any business—including startups and those in high-risk industries—ensuring that all California employers have access to workers’ compensation coverage, no matter their claims history.
- It serves only businesses based in California.

State Fund was created by the Boynton Act of 1913, and it started operations in 1914. Around that same time, the voters amended the California Constitution by initiative to strengthen the constitutionality of the state workers' compensation system. This was necessary because American employers during the early 20th century often challenged mandatory workers' compensation statutes as an unconstitutional invasion of freedom of contract, an argument which had strong persuasive force during the Lochner era. Since 1976, State Fund's constitutional basis has been found in Article 14, Section 4 of the state constitution:

The Legislature is hereby expressly vested with plenary power, unlimited by any provision of this Constitution, to create, and enforce a complete system of workers' compensation...including the establishment and management of a state compensation insurance fund...

In May 2026, State Fund reported total assets of more than $20.3 Billion. In 2025, it declared a policyholder dividend for the seventh year in row.

State Fund also serves as a third-party administrator, adjusting claims for almost all state agencies in California.

It has a workforce of more than 3,800 people (the number varies based on State Fund's business needs).

California is one of 21 states with a competitive state fund in the workers' compensation insurance market.

== Notes ==
1. California Labor Code Section 11773.
2. "About Us". www.StateFundCA.com. March 13, 2025.
3. "Shake-Up in California's Workers' Comp Market". Workers' Comp Executive. June 24, 2026.
4. "California Workers Comp Providers: Private Insurers vs. State Fund". John G. Petit Insurance Agency Inc. August 19, 2026.
5. "State Fund in the 1990s". www.StateFundCA.com. August 17, 2026.
6. "State Fund Facts". www.StateFundCA.com. January 7, 2025.
7. California Constitution, Article XIV, Section 4.
8. "2025 Financial Summary" (PDF). www.StateFundCA.com. May 20, 2026.
9. "2025 President's Letter". www.StateFundCA.com. May 20, 2026.
10. "Staffing Update Board of Directors – Open Agenda Item 4" (PDF). www.StateFundCA.com. August 14, 2026.
