= 5Rocks =

South Korea IT company

- Industry: Mobile analytics, game operation
- Founded: 2010
- Founder: Changsu Lee
- Headquarters: Seoul, South Korea
- Number of locations: Seoul, Tokyo
- Key people: Changsu Lee: CEO; Chester Roh: CSO
- Products: 5Rocks
- Website: 5rocks.io/en

5Rocks is a company established in South Korea that specializes in providing business intelligence for lifetime value maximization for mobile game developers, publishers and ad network service providers. Its analytics tool offers not only analysis but also operation tool for mobile game clients. Based on its unique cohort analytics and combined operation, mobile game operators or developer are enabled to communicate with their game users. 5Rocks provides push notification and in-app-campaign such as announcement, in-app product promotion, rewards, and cross promotion. In April 2014, the company announced that it had secured more than 400 clients over the world. 5Rocks is funded by KDDI, Adways, Stonebridge Capital and recently Global Brain. Mobile monetization and ad-tech firm Tapjoy acquired 5Rocks.
