= SFOX =

sFOX
- Company type: Private
- Industry: Cryptocurrency exchange
- Founded: 2015; 11 years ago
- Key people: George Melika and Akhbar Thobani
- Website: sfox.com

sFOX (San Francisco Open Exchange) is a cryptocurrency prime dealer and trading platform founded in 2014.

== History ==
The company was founded by George Melika and Akhbar Thobani in 2014 as the San Francisco Open Exchange (SFOX). Thobani had previously been a software engineer at the startup Airbnb and Melika had been a software developer for asset manager Nuveen. It is a remote company and has no headquarters. It operates as a prime dealer and trading platform. Its users are primarily hedge funds and other institutional investors, it originally accepted users on an invitation-only basis.

As of 2018, Forbes estimated its yearly revenue to be roughly $15 million. In 2018, it raised $22.7 million in funding led by Y Combinator and Tribe Capital.

In 2019, SFOX announced a partnership with M. Y. Safra Bank of New York to offer FDIC insured deposit accounts for crypto traders.

As of 2020, the exchange had a gross trading volume of $11 billion.

In August 2022, the IRS filed requests to serve information summonses to SFOX and M. Y. Safra Bank for the purpose of collecting tax information. On August 15, 2022 the United States Department of Justice ruled that SFOX would have to provide the IRS with trading records for users conducted trades totaling $20,000 or more on its platform.
