= Workato =

American cloud integration platform company

- Industry: Software
- Founded: 2013
- Founder: Vijay Tella, Gautham Viswanathan, Harish Shetty, Dimitris Kogias
- Headquarters: Mountain View, California, United States
- Area served: Global
- Website: www.workato.com

Workato is an American multinational software company that provides a cloud-based platform for automation, integration, and artificial intelligence (AI) orchestration across applications, data, and systems. The company was founded in 2013 and is headquartered in Mountain View, California.

== History ==
Workato was founded in 2013 by Vijay Tella, Gautham Viswanathan, Harish Shetty, and Dimitris Kogias. It has received investment from entities including ServiceNow, Altimeter Capital, Insight Partners, and Redpoint Ventures.

The company laid off about 10% of its workforce in 2023. It opened offices in Dublin and Singapore in 2021 and a data center in Australia in 2023.

In March 2025, Workato acquired support automation provider DeepConverse for an undisclosed amount.

In August 2025, Workato acquired AI company XMAD.ai to strengthen its AI capabilities. The company has raised over $200 million in Series E funding at a $5.7 billion valuation.

In 2026, Workato launched its Enterprise Model Context Protocol (MCP) platform, enabling AI agents from tools such as Claude and ChatGPT to securely access and act upon enterprise applications while following established governance and security protocols.

== Platform overview ==
Workato's platform is designed for integrating different systems and automating workflows. Key features include: a drag-and-drop interface, enabling users to create data integrations, customize workflows, and publish APIs, low-code/no-code capabilities with prebuilt connectors known as "recipes", and real-time monitoring and management of data sharing between systems.
