= Spark Capital =

American venture capital firm

Spark Capital Partners, LLC
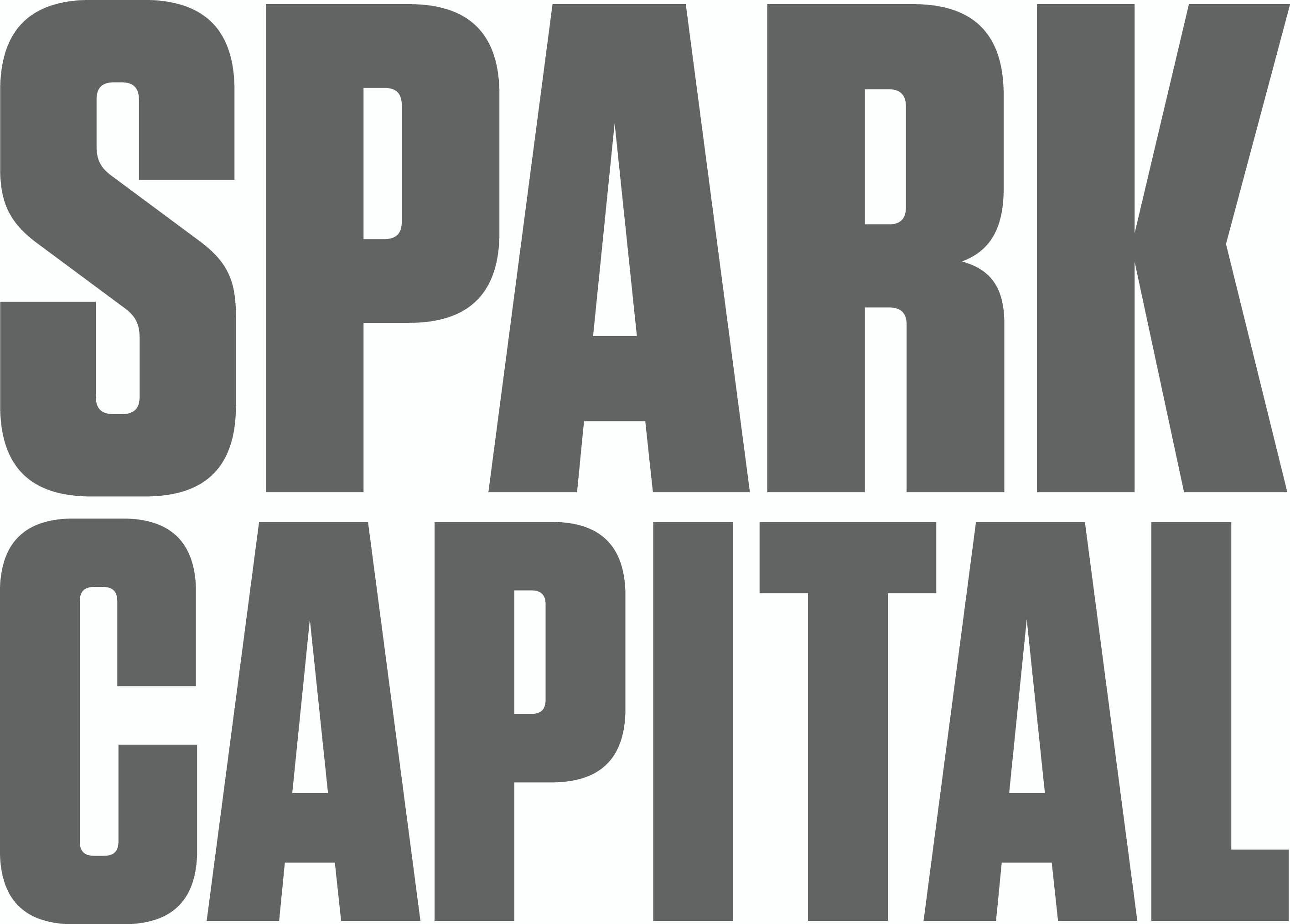
- Industry: Venture capital
- Founded: 2005; 21 years ago
- Headquarters: San Francisco, New York, and Boston
- Key people: Alex Finkelstein, Nabeel Hyatt, Jeremy Philips, Santo Politi, Yasmin Razavi, Will Reed, Bijan Sabet, Kevin Thau
- AUM: USD $15 Billion
- Website: sparkcapital.com

Spark Capital Partners, LLC is an American multi-stage venture capital firm with operations in San Francisco, New York, and Boston. Spark is a generalist VC firm that invests in consumer internet, enterprise software, gaming, infrastructure technologies, hardware, semiconductors, crypto, fintech, and AI.

== Funds ==
Spark Capital was launched in 2005 by Paul Conway, Santo Politi, and Todd Dagres.Today the firm manages assets north of $12 billion. They have raised eight early-stage funds: US$265 million in 2005; $360 million in 2008; $360 million in 2010; $450 million in 2013; $400 million in 2016; $450 million in 2019; $700M in 2021; and $700M in 2024.They have also raised five growth funds: $375 million in 2014; $600 million in 2016;$900 million in 2019; $1.4B in 2021; and $1.4B in 2024.

== Team ==
Spark Capital was founded in 2005 by Bijan Sabet, Paul Conway, Santo Politi, and Todd Dagres. Other people who have joined the company since its inception include Jeremy Philips, Alex Finkelstein, Yasmin Razavi, Will Reed and Nabeel Hyatt. The company consists of approximately 11–50 employees.

== Investment approach ==
Spark Capital has been known for co-investing with Union Square Ventures. Many of Spark Capital's early picks, including Twitter, Tumblr, and Foursquare, were made via partner Bijan Sabet and were joint investments with Union Square Ventures, made by partner Fred Wilson. Sabet says that Spark Capital's portfolio companies do not use non-compete agreements, which he says have been a key factor in limiting startup growth in New York and Boston.

Spark is known for its early Series C investment in Anthropic, turning $75 million into $3 billion.

== Companies ==
Spark is/has been an early institutional investor in:

- Affirm: Spark Capital led the series B, with Jeremy Philips joining the board.
- AlpacaDB
- Anthropic: Yasmin Razavi, the company's General Partner at Spark Capital led the Series C (first institutional VC round) in 2022.
- The Bot Company: Kyle Vogt's venture after Cruise, Nabeel Hyatt co-led the $150M series A.
- Coinbase
- Cruise: Spark Capital invested in Cruise in the Series A funding round, and the company's General Partner Nabeel Hyatt joined the board of directors.
- Deel: Spark Capital led the Series B in 2020, the company's General Partner, Yasmin Razavi joining the board.
- Discord: Spark Capital invested in multiple funding rounds of a gamer chat tool Discord, with General Partner Nabeel Hyatt joining the board as an observer.
- Oculus: Spark capital invested in Oculus VR in both Series A and Series B funding rounds, which was subsequently sold to Facebook for an estimated $2 billion. The company's General Partner Santo Politi joined the board of directors.
- Slack
- Twitter: Bijan Sabet, the partner at Spark Capital, invested in Twitter's second (Series B) round in June 2008, along with Jeff Bezos and additional investments from past investors such as Fred Wilson of Union Square Ventures, and Sabet also accepted a board seat at Twitter. According to Hatching Twitter, Sabet and Wilson played a crucial role in facilitating smooth leadership changes at Twitter in October 2008 and later October 2010—ousting Jack Dorsey to install Evan Williams in 2008 and ousting Williams to install Dick Costolo in 2010.
- Tumblr: Spark Capital was one of the early investors in Tumblr, where they co-invested with Union Square Ventures, paying the same amount for the same share, with Bijan Sabet as the assigned partner from Spark Capital. Following the sale of Tumblr to Yahoo! for $1.1 billion, Spark Capital and Union Square Ventures each took home $192 million from the deal.

=== Others ===
- Carta
- Framework Computer
- Plaid
- Postmates
- Scale AI
- Ramp
