= Tribe Capital =

American venture capital firm

Tribe Capital Management, LLC
- Type: Private
- Industry: Venture capital
- Founded: 2018; 8 years ago
- Founders: Arjun Sethi; Jonathan Hsu; Ted Maidenberg
- Headquarters: Menlo Park, California, United States
- AUM: US$1.9 billion (2025)
- Website: www.tribecap.co

Tribe Capital Management, LLC is an American venture capital firm. It was founded in 2018 as a spinoff of Social Capital. It funds startups in software and cryptocurrency both in the United States and internationally.

== History ==
Thrive Capital was founded by Arjun Sethi, Jonathan Hsu, and Ted Maidenberg in 2018. Its first investment was in Sfox in 2018.

In 2021, Tribe sponsored a special-purpose acquisition company that became a public company on the Nasdaq with $240 million in capital.

In July 2021, Tribe Capital's assets under management were $1.5 billion.

After the 2022 crash in the cryptocurrency market, the company was still optimistic on cryptocurrency companies.

In October 2022, leaked documents showed Tribe Capital's first fund had seen a "nearly fivefold return on investment."

In April 2023, Tribe considered a $250 million bid to restart FTX.

In May 2023, it was planning on starting a fund in India.

The company has been critiqued on matters such as investments in the cryptocurrency market, markdowns on several of its portfolio companies, and its response to the collapse of Silicon Valley Bank in 2023.

On December 11, 2023, co-founder Arjun Sethi became Tribe's chairman and chief investment officer, and Boris Revsin succeeded him as CEO.

== See also ==
- List of venture capital firms
