= Social Capital (venture capital firm) =

American venture capital firm

- Type: Private
- Industry: Venture capital
- Founded: 2011; 15 years ago
- Founders: Chamath Palihapitiya, Mamoon Hamid, Ted Maidenberg
- Headquarters: Palo Alto, California, United States
- Products: Investments
- Website: Official website

Social Capital, formerly known as Social+Capital Partnership, is a venture capital firm based in Palo Alto, California with approximately $2B in assets under management. The firm specializes in technology startups, providing seed funding, venture capital, and private equity.

The firm has "stood out strategically", according to Fortune, "with a focus on ... healthcare, financial services and education ... when those fields were ... neglected by the VC community."

== History ==
Social Capital was founded in 2011 by Chamath Palihapitiya, who had previously worked at Facebook. Mamoon Hamid and Ted Maidenberg also joined the firm that year as general partners.

In January 2015, Fortune reported that Kleiner Perkins was in acquisition talks with Social Capital, but the acquisition reportedly fell through. In May 2015, Social Capital raised $600 million in their third and largest venture capital fund. PayPal cofounder Peter Thiel praised Palihapitiya's approach, and as of 2015 served as a limited partner.

In 2017, Marc Mezvinsky joined Social Capital as vice chairman as it sought to expand beyond traditional venture capital.

In August 2017, Hamid left Social Capital to join Kleiner Perkins as a general partner and managing member.

In the spring of 2018, Mezvinsky departed Social Capital. Later in 2018, then-partners Arjun Sethi, Jonathan Hsu, and Ted Maidenberg left the firm to co-found Tribe Capital.

In March 2024, Social Capital fired two of its senior partners, Jay Zaveri and Ravi Tanuku, over fundraising capital in the form of a special purpose vehicle for a startup that was part of their existing investment portfolio, purportedly without the knowledge of Palihapitiya. Several Social Capital employees participated including the firm's general counsel. As of March 2024, Palihapitiya is the sole investing partner remaining at Social Capital, according to Pitchbook records.

== Investments ==
Social Capital invested in Yammer in 2011, which was later bought by Microsoft. In 2012, the firm invested in Impermium, which was acquired by Google in 2014. Also in 2012, the firm was a venture investor in InstaEDU, acquired by Chegg in 2014. Social Capital led a round of Series B funding for Wave Accounting. In 2014, Social Capital also invested in LotusFlare.

In May 2015, the firm was a leading investor in a funding round for Slack Technologies.

Through 2016 and 2017, the firm began a Discover program led by Jay Zaveri to make several investments in climate-related companies UrbanFootprint, Saildrone, Beyond the Dome, and DroneSeed, telecom infrastructure company Eridan, and space technology companies Swarm Technologies and Relativity Space.

In September 2020, their SPAC IPOB merged with Opendoor Technologies with a market cap of $4.8 billion.
