= Shop =

Shop may refer to:

- Retail shop, possibly within a marketplace
- Shopping, to shop

== Arts, entertainment, and media ==
- The Shop, an American television talk show
- The Shoppe, an American country music group
- "Shop", a track from the soundtrack of the 2015 video game Undertale by Toby Fox
- SHOP: A Pop Opera, a 2019 musical comedy short film created by Jack Stauber
- "Shops", an essay by the Hong Kong writer Xi Xi
- The Shop, a fictional government agency which appears in various works by Stephen King, including Firestarter and Golden Years

== Brands and enterprises ==
- SHoP Architects, a New York–based architectural firm
- Shop.ca, a Canadian online e-commerce website
- Shopify (NYSE: SHOP)
- Shop Pay (also known as Shop), a checkout and payment method owned by Shopify.

== Places ==
- Shop, Rajasthan, a town in Tonk district, Rajasthan, India
- Shop, Cornwall, a village in Cornwall, UK

== Science and technology ==
- .shop, a top-level domain
- Shell higher olefin process, or SHOP, a chemical process for the production of α-olefins

== Other uses ==
- Charity shop
- Give-away shop
- "Shop class", an industrial arts educational program

== See also ==
- Shopper (disambiguation)
- Shopping (disambiguation)
- Workshop
- Woodshop (workspace)
