= Check My Ads =

Brand safety non-profit

Check My Ads Institute
- Founded: October 2021; 5 years ago
- Founder: Claire Atkin and Nandini Jammi
- Type: 501(c)(3)
- Purpose: Advertising technology industry
- Website: checkmyads.org

The Check My Ads Institute is an organization founded by Nandini Jammi and Claire Atkin. The Check My Ads Institute is a non-profit advertising watchdog organization created in October 2021, which aims to bring transparency and accountability to the advertising technology industry. Jammi and Atkin previously published a newsletter called Branded. The Check My Ads Agency was a brand safety and marketing consultancy that Atkin and Jammi founded in 2020. As of February 2023, the Check My Ads Agency is no longer active.

Atkin and Jammi originally focused primarily on the issue of advertisements displaying on websites they describe as "bad faith publishers": websites containing fake news, medical misinformation, and conspiracy theories, or websites engaged in advertising fraud. Many companies are not aware specifically where their advertisements display due to the complexity and lack of transparency in online advertising; the Check My Ads Institute researches the online advertising industry, and pushes for increased transparency and choice. The Check My Ads Agency aimed to help companies learn more about where their products or services are advertised and avoid advertising on harmful websites.

== History ==
Prior to Check My Ads, Nandini Jammi had co-founded and run the social media watchdog organization Sleeping Giants, which focused on pressuring companies to remove their advertising from far-right websites. Claire Atkin was a marketer who had become concerned about the role of online advertising in enabling disinformation, and its ultimate influence in elections. In January 2020 they published their first issue of Branded, a newsletter where they describe their research into advertising technology (adtech) and problems they identify. In June 2020, Jammi and Atkin co-founded the Check My Ads consulting agency. In October 2021, they co-founded the Check My Ads Institute, a non-profit group to focus on investigative research.

== Organizations and publications ==
=== Check My Ads Institute ===
In October 2021, Atkin and Jammi created the Check My Ads Institute, a non-profit watchdog organization focused on advertising technology, its role in promoting harmful websites and fraud within the industry. The Institute has expanded its focus beyond the investigative reporting Atkin and Jammi have done into advertising's enablement of bad faith publishers. The Institute currently has three primary program areas: Policy, Research and Industry Engagement, and Communications.

=== Branded ===
Jammi and Atkin previously wrote a newsletter called Branded, where they published their research into how adtech funds what they call "bad faith publishers": sites that publish fake news, misinformation, or conspiracy theories, or sites engaged in ad fraud. They published their first issue in January 2020. As of October 2021, Branded had approximately 8,000 subscribers.

=== Check My Ads Agency ===
Check My Ads Agency
- Industry: Brand safety
- Founded: June 2020; 6 years ago
- Founder: Claire Atkin and Nandini Jammi
- Defunct: 2023
- Headquarters: Washington, D.C.
- Website: checkmyads.co

The Check My Ads Agency was a for-profit brand safety and marketing consultancy. With the emergence of programmatic advertising, online advertisements are often bought per-impression in real time: ad space on a page is bought and filled as a user loads a webpage. Because of the automated and highly complex nature of these systems, companies often don't have much information about the websites on which their advertisements may eventually be displayed. Companies hired Check My Ads to help them identify and vet where their advertisements are being displayed, and also to limit spending on fraudulent advertising schemes or ineffective campaigns. The agency has helped customers avoid inadvertently having their ads display on websites containing content they find objectionable, such as websites that publish medical misinformation or conspiracy theories. Check My Ads also ran brand safety workshops, and created guidelines for marketers.

== Research and activism ==
Among their first stories in Branded was the topic of brand safety organizations blocklisting the word "coronavirus" during the COVID-19 pandemic, without any attempt to determine if a website was a legitimate publisher. Atkin and Jammi said this was having a detrimental effect on the news industry, and that ads were being blocked from publications including The Boston Globe, CBS News, and Vox as a result of the broad filters. They have reported more broadly on keyword blocklists, which they have argued is reducing funding to reporting on important topics; for example, Atkin wrote in Branded in June 2020 that Fidelity Investments had blocklisted the words "immigration" and "racism". According to a Vice Media executive, articles they had published that pertained to George Floyd, protests, and Black Lives Matter earned 57% lower advertising rates despite being some of the most highly-visited.

Beginning in August 2020, Atkin and Jammi have reported on "dark pool sales houses": where a group of unrelated publishers share an ID on an ad exchange, leading to the group being misrepresented as a single entity. This has allowed publishers to circumvent blocks from ad exchanges, as well as illegitimately draw better cost per mille (CPM).

In April 2021, the group reported that some large American adtech companies, including Google and Criteo, had been placing advertisements on Russian-backed disinformation websites even after the websites had been sanctioned by the United States Department of the Treasury's Office of Foreign Assets Control. American companies doing business with sanction groups can result in severe criminal penalties. The adtech companies all stopped working with the Russian sites following the Check My Ads report.
