= Nandini Jammi =

American activist and brand safety consultant (born 1988)

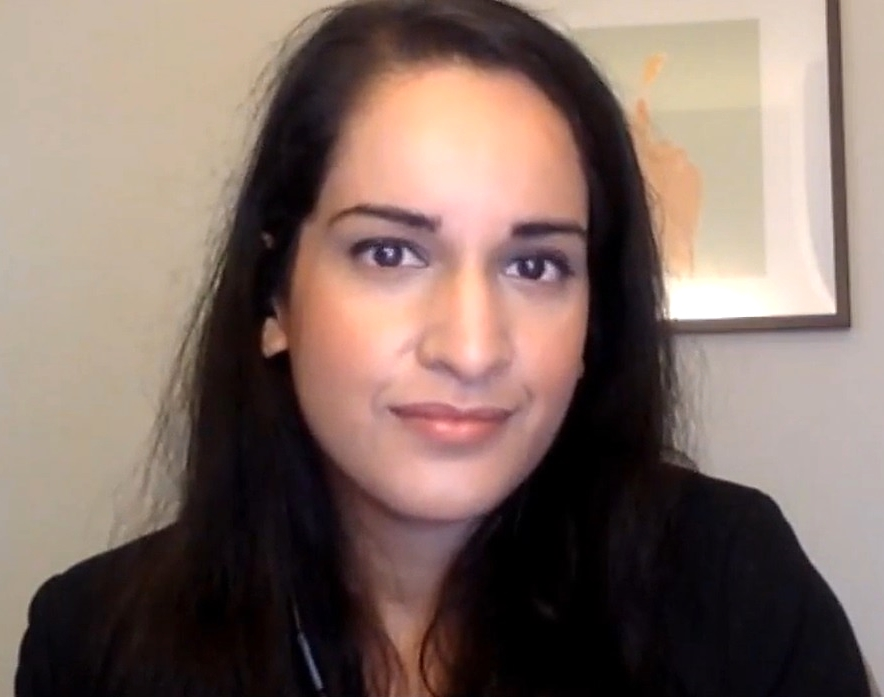
- Jammi in 2020
- Born: 1988 or 1989 (age 36–37); Hyderabad, India
- Occupations: Activist and brand safety consultant
- Known for: Check My Ads, Sleeping Giants

Nandini Jammi (born 1988 or 1989) is an American activist and brand safety consultant. She is a co-founder of the Check My Ads agency and associated non-profit Check My Ads Institute. Previously, she co-founded Sleeping Giants. She informs businesses about their advertisements that appear on conservative websites that she describes as bad faith publishers—websites that publish misinformation or conspiracy theories, or engage in advertising fraud—and pressures them to stop supporting those publishers.

== Early life and education ==
Jammi immigrated to the United States from India as a child, and grew up in the suburbs of Washington, D.C. She is from a Telugu family from Hyderabad and attended college at the University of Maryland, where she contributed to the college newspaper, The Diamondback.

== Career and activism ==
Jammi began her career in marketing, initially working in Europe as a remote digital marketer. She subsequently joined a United Kingdom-based startup that built product management software, where she was solely responsible for the company's direct marketing. She later became a freelance copywriter and marketing consultant, and lived in Berlin.

=== Sleeping Giants (2016–2020) ===
Soon after the 2016 United States presidential election, Jammi visited the Breitbart News website and saw an Old Navy ad with a photograph of an interracial couple. She wrote a Medium post advocating for marketers to stop running ads with Breitbart. She and Matt Rivitz, a copywriter who had just pushed for mortgage company SoFi to stop running ads on Breitbart, joined together to create the initially anonymous Sleeping Giants campaign in November 2016. In July 2018, The Daily Caller reported that Rivitz was behind the Sleeping Giants account. A New York Times profile published two days later revealed both Jammi and Rivitz.

Through Sleeping Giants, the two succeeded in getting hundreds of large brands to stop running ads on Breitbart. Breitbart's former executive chair, Steve Bannon, was captured on video in 2017 saying that the campaign caused Breitbart's advertising revenues to drop approximately 90%. Sleeping Giants also engaged in campaigns to pressure advertiser boycotts of other websites and individuals, including Tucker Carlson and Bill O'Reilly. Jammi and Rivitz both continued to work at their day jobs while also spending between three and eight hours a day on Sleeping Giants.

In July 2020, Jammi left Sleeping Giants, saying that Rivitz had tried to downplay her role in the organization. She published a blog post after leaving the organization, titled "I'm leaving Sleeping Giants, but not because I want to", with the subtitle: "How my white male co-founder gaslighted me out of the movement we built together". Rivitz subsequently wrote a public apology. By that time, Jammi said she had also begun to develop doubts about Sleeping Giants' approach. She felt the group was having a negative effect on the news industry as a whole, as companies began to shy away from advertising on any news outlets at all over fears their ads might be run alongside objectionable content. She also felt she was "playing Whac-A-Mole" by pressuring individual brands to stop advertising on specific platforms.

=== Check My Ads (2020–present) ===
Jammi joined marketer Claire Atkin to continue her activism and research around advertising's enablement of publishers of fake news, far-right content, medical misinformation, and conspiracy theories. In January 2020, they published their first issue of Branded, a newsletter where they describe their research into advertising technology (adtech) and problems they identify. In June 2020, Jammi and Atkin co-founded the Check My Ads consulting agency. In October 2021, they co-founded the Check My Ads Institute, a non-profit group to focus on investigative research. Both will continue to work with the consulting agency while also working on the non-profit.

Through their work with Check My Ads, Jammi and Atkin have reported on broad keyword blocklisting of words like "coronavirus", "racism", and "immigration", a practice they say has been detrimental to the news industry as a whole. They have reported on "dark pool sales houses", a phenomenon where a group of unrelated publishers share an ID on an ad exchange, leading to the group being misrepresented as a single entity. This has allowed publishers to circumvent blocks from ad exchanges, as well as illegitimately draw better cost per mille (CPM). They have also reported on large American adtech companies, including Google and Criteo, placing advertisements on Russian-backed disinformation websites even after the websites had been sanctioned by the United States Department of the Treasury's Office of Foreign Assets Control.

=== Other activism and work ===
In 2021, Jammi and others pressured companies to stop running ads with The Post Millennial and other companies who employ the right-wing journalist Andy Ngo.

Jammi is on the advisory committee of Good Information Inc., a public-benefit corporation launched in October 2021 and led by Tara McGowan. The company aims to fund new media organizations and combat disinformation.
