= Shopify =

Canadian e-commerce company

Shopify Inc.
- Type: Public
- Traded as: TSX: SHOP (Class A); S&P/TSX 60 component; Nasdaq: SHOP; Nasdaq-100 component
- ISIN: CA82509L1076
- Industry: E-commerce
- Founded: 2006; 20 years ago
- Founders: Tobias Lütke; Daniel Weinand; Scott Lake
- Headquarters: Ottawa, Ontario, Canada
- Key people: Tobias Lütke (CEO); Harley Finkelstein (president)
- Services: Online shopping
- Revenue: ▲US$11.6 billion (2025)
- Operating income: ▲US$1.47 billion (2025)
- Net income: ▼US$1.23 billion (2025)
- Total assets: ▲US$15.2 billion (2025)
- Total equity: ▲US$13.5 billion (2025)
- Number of employees: 7,600 (2025)
- Website: shopify.com

Shopify Inc. is a Canadian multinational e-commerce company headquartered in Ottawa, Ontario, that operates a cloud e-commerce management platform (CEMP) for retail point-of-sale systems. The company has over five million customers and processed US$292.3 billion in transactions in 2024, of which 57% was in the United States. Major customers include Tesla, LVMH, Nestlé, PepsiCo, AB InBev, Kraft Heinz, Lindt, Whole Foods Market, Red Bull, and Hyatt.

The company's software has been praised for its ease of use and reasonable fee structure. It has been described as the "go-to e-commerce platform for startups".

== History ==
=== 2006: Founding ===
Shopify was founded in 2006 by friends Tobias Lütke, Daniel Weinand and Scott Lake after launching Snowdevil, an online store for snowboarding equipment, in 2004. Dissatisfied with the existing e-commerce products on the market, Lütke, a computer programmer by trade, instead built his own.

Lütke used the open source web application framework Ruby on Rails to build Snowdevil's online store and launched it after two months of development. The Snowdevil founders launched the platform as Shopify in June 2006. Shopify created an open-source template language called Liquid, which is written in Ruby and has been used since 2006.

In June 2009, Shopify launched an application programming interface (API) platform and App Store. The API allows developers to create applications for Shopify online stores and then sell them on the Shopify App Store.

=== 2010s ===
In January 2010, Shopify started its Build-A-Business competition, in which participants create a business using its commerce platform. The winners of the competition received cash prizes and mentorship from entrepreneurs, such as Richard Branson, Eric Ries and others. In April of that year, Shopify launched a free mobile app on the Apple App Store. The app allows Shopify store owners to view and manage their stores from iOS mobile devices.

In December 2010, Shopify raised $7 million from a series A round from Bessemer Venture Partners, FirstMark Capital, and Felicis Ventures at a $20 million pre-money valuation. At that time, the company had an annualized transaction value of $132 million. In October 2011, it raised $15 million in a Series B round.

In August 2013, Shopify launched Shopify Payments in partnership with Stripe. Shopify Payments allows merchants to accept payments without requiring a third-party payment gateway. The company also announced the launch of a point of sale system to enable in-person sales in addition to online. The company received $100 million in Series C funding in December 2013. Shopify earned $105 million in revenue in 2014, twice as much as it raised the previous year. In February 2014, Shopify released "Shopify Plus" for large e-commerce businesses seeking access to additional features and support.

Shopify went public via an initial public offering on May 21, 2015, raising more than $131 million. In September 2015, Amazon.com closed its Amazon Webstore service for merchants and selected Shopify as the preferred migration provider.

In April 2016, Shopify announced Shopify Capital, a cash advance product. Shopify Capital was initially piloted to merchants within the US and allowed merchants to receive an advance on future earnings processed through its payment gateway. Since its launch in 2016, Shopify Capital has provided more than $5.1 billion in funding to Shopify merchants, with a maximum advance of $2 million. On June 7, 2016, Shopify launched its Shopify Plus Partners Program, to help agencies connect with evolving businesses in ecommerce space. On October 3, 2016, Shopify acquired Boltmade. In November 2016, Shopify partnered with Paystack which allowed Nigerian online retailers to accept payments from customers around the world. On November 22, 2016, Shopify launched Frenzy, a mobile app that improves flash sales.

In January 2017, Shopify announced integration with Amazon that would allow merchants to sell on Amazon from their Shopify stores. In April 2017, Shopify introduced its Chip & Swipe Reader, a Bluetooth enabled debit and credit card reader for brick and mortar retail purchases. The company has since released additional technology for brick-and-mortar retailers, including a point-of-sale system with a Dock and Retail Stand similar to that offered by Square, and a tappable chip card reader.

Shopify announced a one-click accelerated checkout feature called Shopify Pay in April 2017 as an exclusive feature for merchants using Shopify Payments as their payment processor. Customers can save their shipping and payment information for future purchases from all participating Shopify stores. In November 2017, Shopify announced Arrive, a mobile application to help customers track packages from both Shopify merchants and other e-commerce websites.

In September 2018, Shopify announced plans to expand its office space in Toronto's King West neighborhood in 2022 as part of "The Well" complex, jointly owned by Allied Properties REIT and RioCan REIT. In October 2018, Shopify opened its first flagship, a physical space for business owners in Los Angeles. The space offered educational classes, coworking space, a "genius bar" for companies that use Shopify software, and workshops. Online cannabis sales in Ontario, Canada, used Shopify's software when the drug was legalized in October 2018. Shopify's software is also used for in-person cannabis sales in Ontario since becoming legal in 2019.

In January 2019, Shopify announced the launch of Shopify Studios, a full-service television and film content and production house. On March 22, 2019, Shopify and email marketing platform Mailchimp ended an integration agreement over disputes involving customer privacy and data collection. In April 2019, Shopify announced an integration with Snapchat to allow Shopify merchants to buy and manage Snapchat Story ads directly on the Shopify platform. The company had previously secured similar integration partnerships with Facebook and Google. On August 14, 2019, Shopify launched Shopify Chat, a new native chat function that allows merchants to have real-time conversations with customers visiting Shopify stores online.

=== 2020s ===
In January 2020, the company announced plans to hire in Vancouver, Canada. Additionally, the effects of the COVID-19 pandemic contributed to lifting stock prices. On February 21, 2020, Shopify announced plans to join the Diem Association, known as the Libra Association at the time. Also that month, Shopify Pay was rebranded as Shop Pay. In April, Arrive was rebranded as Shop, combining both customer-facing features under a single brand. In May, during the COVID-19 pandemic, Shopify announced it would shift most of its global workforce to permanent remote work. It was reported that Shopify's valuation would likely rise on the back of options it had in the company Affirm that was expecting to go public shortly. In November 2020, Shopify announced a partnership with Alipay to support merchants with cross-border payments. Shopify also provided the opportunity for users to connect Alibaba and AliExpress to Shopify through an Alibaba Dropshipping app that could be purchased through the Shopify App Store. Multiple applications launched between 2021 and 2024 allowed customers to connect their Shopify store to their Alibaba account and then import and publish their products. The integration automatically syncs inventory and orders between both platforms so that Alibaba vendors can ship directly to dropshipping customers.As a result of Affirm's January 13, 2021 IPO, Shopify's 8% stake in Affirm was worth $2 billion. About half of Shopify's C-level executives left the company in early 2021. On June 29, 2021, Shopify removed the 20% revenue share for app developers that make less than US$1 million per year.

On January 18, 2022, Shopify announced a partnership with JD.com to let U.S. merchants expand their operations in China, listing their products on JD's cross-border e-commerce platform JD Worldwide. On March 22, 2022, Shopify introduced Linkpop, a product to create a branded, social marketplace through which merchants can advertise and market their products via links to be added on social media channels. The following month, Shopify, Alphabet Inc., Meta Platforms, McKinsey & Company, and Stripe, Inc. announced a $925 million advance market commitment of carbon dioxide removal (CDR) from companies that are developing CDR technology over the next 9 years.

In June 2022, Shopify partnered with Twitter. As a part of the deal, Twitter announced that it would launch a sales channel app for all of Shopify's U.S. merchants through its app store. Shopify also partnered with PayPal to offer Shopify Payments to merchants in France. On July 26, 2022, Lütke announced immediate layoffs totalling roughly 10 percent of its workforce. In a message to employees, the CEO and founder said the company's planning on growth rates continuing on the trajectory of the past two years "didn't pay off" and forced the company to downsize. In August 2022, Shopify announced it was making e-commerce marketing automation platform, Klaviyo, the recommended email solution partner for its Shopify Plus merchant platform, with a US$100 million strategic investment into the company.

In May 2023, Shopify laid off approximately 20% of its workforce and sold Shopify Logistics, its in-house logistics arm, to Flexport, which subsequently became the preferred logistics partner for the e-commerce platform.

On March 18, 2025, Shopify announced that it will transfer its U.S. listing from the NYSE to the Nasdaq Global Select Market. Shopify began trading as a Nasdaq-listed security on March 31, and became a component of the Nasdaq-100 index on May 19 at the stock market open.

On December 1, 2025, Shopify ended the trading day down 5.9% as some business owners were unable to log into their administrative portals and process retail sales on Shopify's point of sale.

In January 2026, Shopify and Google announced the Universal Commerce Protocol (UCP), an open standard enabling AI agents to discover products and complete transactions with merchants.

In May 2026, both Cathie Wood and Thrive Capital announced nine figure investments into Shopify.

==== Position on U.S.-Canada tariffs and Canadian retaliation ====
In 2025, Shopify founder and CEO Tobias Lütke criticized the federal Canadian government for its decision to impose retaliatory tariffs on the United States after President Donald Trump enacted 25% tariffs on Canadian goods. Lütke expressed disappointment with Trump's tariffs decision, but added, "Trump believes that Canada has not held its side of the bargain, and he set terms to prove that we still work together: get the borders under control and crack down on fentanyl dens." Shopify chief operating officer Kaz Nejatian similarly criticized Canadian policies, saying "Canada has turned a blind eye to being used as a training ground for foreign countries, gangs and terrorist groups."

In February 2026, Shopify reported Q4 2025 revenue of $3.67 billion, a 31% year-over-year increase, and full-year 2025 revenue of $11.56 billion, up 30% from 2024, driven by growth in B2B sales and expanded AI commerce tools. The company also announced a $2 billion share buyback program.

== Technology ==
Shopify was initially built on Ruby on Rails in 2004, using a single MySQL instance. In 2014, Shopify introduced sharding to distribute Shopify to multiple databases. Over the years, Shopify later moved to fully isolated instances.

Shopify maintains Hydrogen, an open-source headless JavaScript stack created in 2021, for its client-facing storefront applications. Developers are able to deploy their Hydrogen applications to Oxygen, Shopify's managed hosting and content delivery network. Hydrogen is built on top of the React library for client-side JavaScript, and Remix for its server-side routing capabilities.

In 2025, Shopify announced that over the last five years it had migrated all of its apps to React Native so that the same code could be employed for all client platforms. In their 2026 earnings call Shopify mentioned that their new AI search features is responsible for improving shopping conversion and boosting sales.

== Shopify App Store ==
Shopify launched an app store on June 2, 2009. By 2024, the app store had over 10,000 apps available. As of 2021, a typical Shopify merchant used six apps to manage their business and, in 2020, Shopify app partners collectively earned over $230 million on the platform.

In 2021, Shopify announced that it would cut its commission on the first million dollars earned by developers in its app store to 0% following similar moves by Apple, Google, and Amazon. In 2022, Shopify partnered with Twitter to allow merchants to sell products via those social media apps. This followed a similar offering with TikTok in 2020. TikTok discontinued this service in 2023.

In 2016, Shopify acquired Kit CRM, an app designed to help merchants manage their stores. Klaviyo, the public company providing a marketing automation platform, was originally launched on the Shopify app store in 2012 and received a $100 million strategic investment from Shopify in 2022.

== Universal Commerce Protocol and AI commerce ==
In January 2026, Shopify announced an AI project to co-develop what it calls a "Universal Commerce Protocol" (UCP), an open standard designed to allow artificial intelligence agents to connect and transact with merchants across different platforms and user interfaces. UCP was developed in collaboration with Google with the intention of standardizing agentic commerce.

On 8 September 2026, Shopify announced the addition of Meta to its Agentic Storefronts channels.

== Shopify Partner Directory ==
The Shopify Partner Directory is a public listing of third-party experts, agencies, and freelancers certified by Shopify to assist merchants in building, customizing, or managing their online stores. Launched as part of the Shopify Partners program, the directory includes developers, designers, marketers, and consultants who meet Shopify's eligibility criteria, such as completing training or demonstrating expertise. Merchants can filter partners by services, location, or client reviews.

== Shop Pay ==
Shop Pay (formerly Shopify Pay) is a checkout and payment method developed by Shopify. Users add shipping and billing information to a Shop account, which enables one-click checkout on online stores that offer Shop Pay. Launched in April 2017, it was rebranded as Shop Pay in 2020 and later became an accepted payment method on Facebook and Instagram. In 2024, Shopify reported that Shop Pay had over 150 million users worldwide.

== Esports ==
In February 2021, Shopify announced that the company has formed an esports organization called Shopify Rebellion, and put together a professional StarCraft II team to compete in international tournaments. The team members include former 2016 world champion "ByuN" (Byun Hyun-woo) as well as "Scarlett" (Sasha Hostyn).

In September 2023, Shopify Rebellion announced it had purchased Team SoloMid's spot in the LCS, the main North American League of Legends esports competition.

== Last-mile logistics ==
In April 2021, Shopify made its first entry in last-mile logistics by investing in Swyft, a Toronto-based digital logistics startup. As part of a Series A round of funding, a total of $17.5 million was raised for Swyft, co-led by Inovia Capital and Forerunner Ventures with participation from Shopify.

On May 5, 2022, Shopify announced its acquisition of Deliverr, a San Francisco, California-based ecommerce fulfilment startup, for US$2.1 billion in cash and stock. In May 2023, Shopify wound down its logistics business, selling off its prior related acquisitions; Deliverr and 6 River Systems to Flexport and Ocado Group respectively. As part of the Flexport deal, Shopify received a 13% stake in it, besides making Flexport its official logistics partner.

== Acquisitions ==
In February 2012, Shopify acquired Select Start Studios Inc ("S3"), a mobile software developer, along with 20 of the company's mobile engineers and designers. In August 2013, Shopify acquired Jet Cooper, a 25-person design studio based in Toronto.

On December 5, 2016, Shopify acquired Toronto-based mobile product development studio Tiny Hearts. The Tiny Hearts building has been turned into a Shopify research and development office.

In May 2019, Shopify acquired Handshake, a business-to-business e-commerce platform for wholesale goods. The Handshake team was integrated into Shopify Plus, and Handshake founder and CEO Glen Coates was made Director of Product for Shopify Plus. In June 2019, Shopify announced that it would launch its Fulfilment Network. The service promises to handle shipping logistics for merchants and will compete with an established leader, Amazon FBA. Shopify Fulfillment Network will be available to qualifying U.S. merchants in select states. On September 9, 2019, Shopify announced the acquisition of 6 River Systems, a Massachusetts-based company that makes warehouse robots. The acquisition was finalized in October, resulting in a cash-and-share deal worth US$450 million.

On June 11, 2021, Shopify announced its acquisition of Primer, an AR app on the App Store that allows users to preview home improvement items digitally. On April 11, 2022, Shopify announced its acquisition of Dovetale, an influencer marketing startup from New York. In October, the company acquired Remix, a full-stack TypeScript framework that provides "snappy page loads and instant transitions".

On June 3, 2024, Shopify announced its acquisition of Checkout Blocks, an app on its App Store "that enables merchants to unlock customized extensibility" with no-code customizations in checkout. Also in June 2024, Shopify acquired business communication startup Threads for an undisclosed amount of money.

== Recognition ==
Shopify was named Ottawa's Fastest Growing Company by the Ottawa Business Journal in 2010.

By 2014, the platform had hosted approximately 120,000 online retailers, and was listed as #3 in Deloitte's Fast50 in Canada, as well as #7 in Deloitte's Fast 500 of North America.

== Controversies ==
In 2017, the #DeleteShopify hashtag campaign called for a boycott of Shopify for allowing Breitbart News to host a shop on its platform. Shopify's CEO, Tobias Lütke, responded to the criticism, saying "refusing to do business with the site would constitute a violation of free speech".

In October 2017, Citron Research founder, short-seller Andrew Left released a report that claimed Shopify was overstating the number of merchants using the e-commerce platform and described it as a "get-rich-quick" scheme in contravention of Federal Trade Commission regulations. The day the report was released, the stock plunged more than 11%. Left wrote another report about Shopify in April 2019, stating he believed Shopify's stock price would come down 50% in the next 12 months. In January 2020, Left announced in his annual letter to investors that Citron Research had exited the short position. The reports did not lead to an investigation into Shopify by the FTC.

In October 2018, an article in The Logic found several groups identified by Southern Poverty Law Center as "hate groups" were using Shopify's platform for their online stores.

In July 2022, Shopify was criticized by left-leaning media watchdog Media Matters for America for hosting the online store for Libs of TikTok. In response to Media Matters, a Shopify spokesperson stated Libs of TikTok was not in violation of the company's Acceptable Use Policy, which "clearly outlines the activities that are not permitted on [the] platform". In November 2022, this type of criticism was renewed when an article published by the Canadian Broadcasting Corporation (CBC) highlighted Ottawa City Council member Ariel Troster's criticism of Shopify in light of a recent shooting at an LGBTQ nightclub. Sharing the CBC article, Nandini Jammi of Check My Ads criticized Shopify on Twitter. In response to Jammi, CEO Tobias Lütke tweeted, "Shopify has a published acceptable use policy and a principled process to apply it. Pressure groups on all sides try to influence it sometimes and CBC needs to see through that not amplify bad faith narrative." Other allegations have appeared criticizing Shopify for hosting stores for far-right figures and organizations, including merchandise for Holocaust denial.

In November 2024, Bloomberg revealed that the Anti-Defamation League and Stop Antisemitism were critical of Shopify hosting an online store full of antisemitic merchandise and engaging in holocaust denial, a crime in Canada. Sarah Fogg of the Montreal Holocaust Museum told Bloomberg how some of the merchandise "would absolutely consist of Holocaust distortion and denial" Bloomberg also noted that while Shopify used to ban "hateful content" under previous versions of its Acceptable Use Policy, they removed it in July 2024.

In February 2025, Shopify received criticism from The Simon Wiesenthal Center and former Shopify executives for hosting Kanye West's Yeezy shop after West took out a television advertisement during Super Bowl LIX promoting it while its only featured item was a white t-shirt with the Nazi swastika. In the lead-up to the advertisement, West had made posts praising Adolf Hitler to X (formerly Twitter). Initially, Shopify told its support staff to give "no comment", if merchant clients asked about it. However, 24 hours later, Shopify eventually decided to take down West's website, not because it was selling a Nazi t-shirt but because of risk of potential fraud.

== Lawsuits ==
In December 2021, a group of publishers including; Pearson Education Inc., Macmillan Learning, Cengage Learning, Inc., Elsevier Inc., and McGraw Hill sued Shopify, claiming that it had failed to remove listings and stores selling pirated copies of their books and learning materials. The lawsuit was settled "amicably" out of court; the details were not disclosed. A class-action lawsuit for $130 million was filed in May 2023 by employees who had been laid off.

In June 2023, Shopify announced a fight against "patent trolls" who "stealthily orchestrate hundreds of patent litigation cases yearly", and filed a lawsuit.

== Data breach ==
In September 2020, Shopify confirmed a data breach in which customer data for up to 200 merchants was stolen. One of those merchants later said over 4,900 of its customers alone had had their information accessed. Shopify claims that the data stolen included names, addresses, and order details, but not "complete payment card numbers or other sensitive personal or financial information". Shopify said that there was no evidence that the data had been misused, and identified two "rogue members" of its support team as having been responsible. They were laid off, and the matter was forwarded to the United States Federal Bureau of Investigation.

== See also ==
- Comparison of shopping cart software
