= TeamBuy =

Canadian e-commerce company

TeamBuy.ca
- Type: Private
- Industry: group buying, one deal a day
- Founded: October 2009
- Founder: Edward Yao, Andrew Hutchings, Ghassan Halazon, Matthew Morris
- Headquarters: 82 Peter Street; Toronto, Ontario; M5V 1P8
- Area served: Canada, United States
- Key people: Ghassan Halazon, Omar Sahyoun, Andrew Hutchings, Edward Yao
- Number of employees: 100+
- Website: www.teambuy.ca

TeamBuy.ca was an e-commerce company founded in Toronto by Edward Yao, Andrew Hutchings, Matthew Morris, and Ghassan Halazon in October 2009 as the first daily deal site in Canada, gaining first mover advantage. TeamBuy was the largest deals marketplace in Canada. TeamBuy was acquired by US-based e-commerce portfolio player NC Commerce Inc. in 2014.

Prior to the acquisition, TeamBuy and its subsidiaries had rumored sales of $60M per year with a staff of 120, making it the largest deals marketplace in the country, and one of the largest Canadian e-commerce players in general. Ghassan Halazon was the CEO of the Company from March 2010 until it was sold in September 2014. TeamBuy.ca was distinct from some of its competitors as it is both owned and operated in Canada. The start up leveraged the Chinese group buying concept of tuangou to obtain discounts for its clients. These discounts typically ranged anywhere from 50 to 90 percent of the item's regular market price.

TeamBuy.ca's business model was initially based on group buying and one deal a day. In later years, TeamBuy evolved into a broader deal destination site providing offers on a wide range of local services, products and travel offers across Canada. Some of the categories of services offered include restaurants, home and decor, entertainment, vacations, and health & beauty.

CIBC named TeamBuy.ca one of Canada's "Top 30 Hottest Technology Companies" in 2013.

== History ==
=== Funding ===
TeamBuy's growth was supported by private investors that include Insight Venture Partners (New York), ru-Net (Moscow), and Georgian Partners (Toronto) and Social Generations (Dubai) among others. The company was initially featured on CBC Dragons' Den during Season 5, Episode 2 in its early start-up stage, ultimately resulting in two offers by the Dragons.

On July 21, 2011, TeamBuy announced it had received round A funding from ruNet investor of $7 million.

On February 22, 2012, TeamBuy announced it had closed a $5 Million financing round from existing shareholders and will be using the funding to expand newly launched Kids & Baby and Home categories.

=== Headquarters ===
TeamBuy had its national headquarters in Toronto, Ontario, Canada. The location of its building is 82 Peter Street, Toronto, Ontario, M5V 1P8.

=== Satellite Offices ===
TeamBuy utilized a network of local sales executives across the country to source merchant partners. These employees were stationed in multiple major cities across Canada.

=== Expansion ===
TeamBuy.ca had expanded into vertical markets as of June 2011, emerging as a one stop shop for all things savings. The deal a day model transitioned into a broad based marketplace with thousands of deals at any given time.

=== Vertical Markets ===
TeamBuy Travel was launched in June 2011 as TeamBuy.ca's vertical market offer. It offered travel deals to Canadians daily.

TeamBuy Kids and Baby and TeamBuy Home and Decor was launched in February 2012

TeamBuy launch local flyers and Coupons sections to get deals and coupons from local stores like Best Buy, The Home Depot, etc.

=== Merger with Dealfind ===
On January 15, 2013 Teambuy announced they would be merging with Canadian daily deal rival, Dealfind.com. The merger will make the combined company the largest independent daily deal company in Canada. Ghassan Halazon became CEO of the combined company while the former Dealfind founders left the venture.

=== Purchased by NC Commerce Inc. ===
In September, 2014, TeamBuy was acquired by NC Commerce Inc., a US based e-commerce group with over 35 acquisitions. Ghassan Halazon, TeamBuy's CEO and a number of other key executives departed the company around the time of the sale. NC Commerce's assets would later be sold to Buytopia, which is now an EMERGE Commerce Inc. portfolio company.
