= SOP =

Sop, a piece of bread soaked in a liquid, or the verb associated with soaking bread in liquid.

SOP or sop may also refer to:

== Places ==
- Sop (West Papua), an island in Indonesian Papua
- Moore County Airport (North Carolina) (IATA code: SOP)
- Sop town, Radjasthan, India
- Sop, Croatia, a village near Rugvica
- State of Palestine, a country in West Asia

== Arts, entertainment, and media ==
- SOP (variety show) in the Philippines
- Sons of the Patriots, a network in Metal Gear Solid 4: Guns of the Patriots
- An informal term for soprano, a type of the classical female singing voice

== Computing ==
- Same-origin policy, a security measure
- SCSI over PCI Express
- Service-oriented programming
- Service-oriented provisioning

== Process and planning ==
- Sales and operations planning, S&OP
- Standard operating procedure
- Statement of purpose

== Science, medicine, technology ==
- SOP (IRC), Super Operator
- Sensory organ precursor, for example in the NUMB gene
- Small outline package IC
- State of polarization in physics, for example Polarization (waves) § polarization state
- Structure–organization–process
- Sulphate of potash (potassium sulfate)
- Sum of products

== Other uses ==
- SOP (State Protection Service), Polish uniformed service which provides VIP security for the Polish government.
- Sop language, spoken in Papua New Guinea

== See also ==
- Sour sop, or soursop
