= WagJag =

Online deals website

- Screenshot
- Website type: Electronic commerce
- Headquarters: Toronto, Ontario, Canada
- Owners: Emerge Commerce (2017–23); BrandFX (2023–present)
- Website: www.wagjag.com
- Commercial: Yes
- Launched: December 2009; 16 years ago
- Current status: Active

WagJag is a discount product website based in Toronto, Canada. Founded in 2009, it was owned for six years by Emerge Commerce.

On August 10, 2023, it was announced that Emerge had completed the sale of the website to a subsidiary of BrandFX.

== Business model ==
WagJag is a group discount website that provides discounts to its customers.

WagJag makes its money through the transactions of people buying the discounted vouchers. For instance, if WagJag offers a discounted product/service for $50, WagJag would keep a percentage and the remaining percentage would go to the company. The company does not make much profit from this transaction however WagJag has essentially created a demand for that particular product. By only offering a limited number of discounts the remaining handful of customers become curious about the product which has now given the company marketing value as those who were unable to obtain the initial discount are now forced to pay full price.

WagJag has a feature that breaks down urban areas into smaller areas, such as Port Perry and Oakville.

== Criticism ==
Several blogs and comments had been made saying that the customer service for WagJag was terrible. Customers complaints often included long waiting periods for response, difficulty receiving refunds, and featured businesses that would close down. In an interview with TechVibes in December 2010, CEO Jeremy Zuker responded:

"We take this very seriously, and it's disheartening to see some of these [complaints]. At the same time, I know how many transactions we process. And I also know that 99.99 per cent of those are flawless and we get lots of people writing in to us saying how much they love the service and how easy it was."

== See also ==
- Coupons
- Vouchers
