= H1 Inc. =

Healthcare data provider

- Type: Private
- Industry: Technology
- Founded: November 2017; 8 years ago
- Founders: Ariel Katz; Ian Sax
- Headquarters: New York, New York, United States
- Number of employees: 300+ globally (2026)
- Website: h1.com

H1 Inc. is a global healthcare data technology company founded in 2017, and headquartered in New York City. The company operates an AI-powered platform that helps organizations identify and engage doctors for workflows across drug development, medical and commercial engagement, care navigation, and provider data and network intelligence. H1 serves pharmaceutical companies, health plans, health systems, and technology companies. The company has over 300 employees worldwide and hundreds of clients as of September 2026. 85% of the top 20 pharma companies and 9 out of 10 of the top health plans are H1 customers.

== History ==
The company was founded by Ariel Katz and Ian Sax in November 2017 as H1 Insights. H1 started by helping biotech and pharma companies connect with Key Opinion Leaders (KOLs) to advance research, drug development, and other treatments. According to Katz, the company is named for "the statistical representation of a true hypothesis", often expressed as H_{1}, as opposed to a null hypothesis, expressed as H_{0}.

In 2018, the company launched Da Vinci, a market intelligence offering for life science and biotech companies, and subsequently participated in Y Combinator's Winter 2020 batch.

In 2020, H1 expanded its life sciences offering into clinical trials, using its insights to help clinical teams accelerate clinical research.

By November 2021, H1 had over 100 clients including Novartis and AstraZeneca.

In 2022, H1 expanded its platform with Data Streams, broadening the healthcare data and insights available to customers across life sciences workflows.

In December 2024, H1 acquired Ribbon Health to help support provider search and find-care experiences, expanding H1’s offerings.

In June 2025, H1 acquired Veda Data Solutions, expanding its provider data offerings for health plans.

In August 2026, H1 and Novo Nordisk partnered to enhance clinical trial design and execution through AI-enabled workflows and insights.

In September 2026, H1 acquired Defacto Health, expanding its network intelligence capabilities and was selected by CMS to help build a trusted national foundation for provider information.

== Products ==
H1’s platform supports workflows across drug development, medical and commercial engagement, care navigation, provider data, and network intelligence. The company organizes its offerings into six primary solution areas:

- Medical — supports medical affairs teams in identifying and engaging relevant healthcare professionals.
- Clinical — supports clinical trial planning from study design and feasibility through site selection and trial execution.
- Commercial — helps commercial teams identify relevant prescribers and support targeted engagement with healthcare professionals.
- Health Plans — supports provider data accuracy and management across directories, networks, rosters, and internal systems.
- Digital Health — provides provider data used to power find-care, care navigation, referral, and healthcare search experiences.
- Health Systems — supports referral and care navigation workflows to help connect patients with appropriate in-network providers.

== Funding ==
H1 has completed several funding rounds since 2018:

- $40 million led by CVS Health Ventures, the venture capital arm of CVS Health in 2026.
- Series C: $100 million led by Altimeter Capital in November 2021, and $33 million in an extension round with funding from Goldman Sachs Asset Management, Menlo Ventures, Transformation Capital and Novartis Pharma AG in 2022.
- Series B: $58 million co-led by IVP and Menlo Ventures in December 2020.
- Series A: $12.9 million led by Menlo Ventures in April 2020.
- $6 million from Shore Group in 2018.

Other investors include Joe Montana, Baron Davis, Y Combinator, and Underscore VC.
