= AFRM =

AFRM may refer to:

- Armed Forces Reserve Medal, a service medal of the US Armed Forces
- Affirm Holdings (Nasdaq: AFRM), an American financial company
