= Shop.ca =

Canadian e-commerce website

SHOP.CA Network Inc.
- Website type: E-commerce
- Available in: English, French, Spanish
- Founded: January 7, 2011; Toronto, Ontario, Canada
- Headquarters: Toronto
- Area served: Canada
- Founders: Drew Green, Trevor Newell
- Key people: Ghassan Halazon (CEO)
- Industry: Internet
- Services: Online shopping
- Employees: 51-200
- Parent: Emerge Commerce
- Website: shop.ca
- Launched: 2011

Shop.ca is a Canadian coupons and e-commerce brand that originally launched in 2012 as an online marketplace before pivoting toward a coupon and savings content model. The brand is currently operated by EMERGE Commerce, a private equity-backed digital commerce group based in Toronto.

== Overview ==
Founded in January 2011 by Drew Green and Trevor Newell, SHOP.CA was launched in July 2012 as a Canadian e‑commerce marketplace. It allowed third-party sellers to list and sell products directly to Canadian consumers without cross-border fees, eventually offering approximately 15 million SKUs across more than 25 product categories. After experiencing significant growth challenges and filing for bankruptcy protection in mid-2016, the company’s assets were acquired by private equity firm EMERGE Commerce, led by CEO Ghassan Halazon.The company was acquired by Canadian Private Equity firm EMERGE Commerce in mid-2016.

Under EMERGE Commerce (led by CEO Ghassan Halazon), Shop.ca was relaunched in 2018 as a content- and coupon-focused platform. The group's shareholders include a number of institutional and high net worth investors.
