= AdVerif.ai =

Israeli Artificial intelligence company

- Company type: Privately owned company
- Industry: Advertising
- Founded: 2017; 8 years ago
- Founder: Or Levi
- Defunct: 2022
- Fate: Acquired
- Successor: Zefr
- Headquarters: Tel Aviv, Israel
- Area served: Worldwide
- Products: Technology to identify misinformation in advertising
- Owner: Zefr
- Website: adverifai.com

AdVerif.ai was an Israeli company that provides brand safety and ad verification services for brands and advertisers. It specialized in automatically identifying disinformation with FakeRank, a proprietary news quality measure.

AdVerif.ai had offices in Tel Aviv, Amsterdam, New York City, Los Angeles, and Chicago. It was acquired by American brand monitoring company Zefr in 2022 and the main service was integrated by Zefr and renamed Zefr Ai.

== History ==
AdVerif.ai was founded in 2017 by Israeli computer scientist Or Levi.

AdVerif.ai's technology used machine learning and natural language processing to detect questionable content.

The technology was used for fact-checking in Europe and the United States to identify and debunk disinformation. It was also used by government agencies and ad networks. The website is now located at Zefr.com and the AI is rebranded as Zefr AI.
