= Deliverr =

E-commerce fulfillment company

- Type: Corporation
- Industry: Shipping
- Founded: July 28, 2017 in Delaware
- Founders: Harish Abbott and Michael Krakaris
- Fate: Acquired by Flexport
- Website: deliverr.com

Deliverr is an e-commerce fulfillment company based in the United States of America. They integrate with e-commerce marketplaces, such as Walmart, eBay, Amazon, Shopify, Wish, and BigCommerce, offering two-day shipping to merchants selling on Walmart's online marketplace, and similar service with other online marketplaces.

Deliverr was co-founded in 2017 by former Symphony Commerce colleagues Harish Abbott and Michael Krakaris, the latter of whom made the Forbes 30 under 30 list in 2019. They have raised multiple rounds of funding totaling $490.9 million in capital. Their Series F funding round, led by Tiger Global, valued the company at $2 billion post-money.

On May 5, 2022, Deliverr was acquired by Shopify for US$2.1 billion in cash and stock.

On June 6, 2023, Flexport announced the successful completion of its acquisition of Shopify Logistics, including Deliverr, Inc, and became Shopify's official logistics partner and preferred provider for the Shop Promise fast‑delivery program.

== History ==
Deliverr was founded in 2017 by Harish Abbott and Michael Krakaris with the goal of enabling small and medium‑sized e‑commerce merchants to offer fast delivery, often within one to two days, across major marketplaces and storefront platforms. From the outset, the company focused on a marketplace‑agnostic approach and brand‑neutral packaging so that the same fulfillment infrastructure could support sellers on channels such as Walmart, eBay, Shopify, Amazon, Wish, and BigCommerce.

In its early growth phase, Deliverr raised venture financing and expanded its integrations with leading commerce platforms. A 2018 Series A round of approximately $7.1 million led by 8VC helped the company scale its team and partnerships, while it continued to add channel connections and fast‑shipping badging programs for merchants. By late 2021, Deliverr closed a larger late‑stage financing reported as a $250 million Series E that included Tiger Global among its investors, contributing to total funding of roughly $490.9 million prior to acquisition.

Between 2018 and 2021, Deliverr developed a distributed, asset‑light fulfillment network using third‑party warehouses, cross‑docks, and sort centers, and applied predictive analytics to position inventory near expected demand. The company's technology typically placed stock across multiple nodes and routed orders to meet one‑ to two‑day delivery promises, supporting on‑site fast‑shipping badges. By 2022 disclosures, Deliverr's operations included more than 80 warehouse locations, two cross‑dock facilities, and five sortation centers, and the company was shipping over one million U.S. orders per month.

In May 2022, Shopify announced an agreement to acquire Deliverr for approximately $2.1 billion in cash and stock, describing the deal as a way to combine Deliverr's inventory placement and demand‑forecasting technology with the Shopify Fulfillment Network. Shopify said the combined logistics offering would underpin Shop Promise, a delivery‑promise badge for two‑day and next‑day shipping across channels. The transaction closed in July 2022, bringing Deliverr's team and capabilities into Shopify's logistics group alongside 6 River Systems.

In May 2023, Shopify agreed to sell the majority of its logistics business, including Deliverr, to Flexport in exchange for an equity stake, with Flexport becoming Shopify's official logistics partner and primary provider for Shop Promise. The sale closed in June 2023, adding Deliverr's network and software within Flexport's end‑to‑end platform spanning freight forwarding, customs, middle mile, fulfillment, and last mile.
