= Schopper =

Schopper is a German surname; in earlier times, a Schopper (de) was a master shipbuilder in the German-speaking Danube region. Notable people with the surname include:

- Benedikt Schopper (born 1985), German ice hockey player
- Erich Schopper (1892–1978), German general in the Wehrmacht during World War II
- Herwig Schopper (1924–2025), German experimental physicist
- Michael Schopper (born 1942), German operatic baritone, and academic teacher
- Phillip Schopper, American film editor
- Theresa Schopper (born 1961), German politician

== See also ==
- James Schoppert (1947–1992), Tlingit Alaska Native artist and educator
- Shopper (disambiguation)
