= Shop Pay =

Online purchase processing system

- Former name: Shopify Pay (2017-2020)
- Company type: Payment processing
- Founded: April 20, 2017; 9 years ago
- Headquarters: Ottawa, Ontario, Canada
- Parent: Shopify
- Website: shop.app
- Commercial: Yes
- Registration: Free
- Current status: Active

Shop Pay (also known as Shop, and formerly known as Shopify Pay) is a checkout and payment method developed by Shopify. The service allows users to securely store shipping and billing information in their Shop account, enabling one-click checkouts across online stores that offer Shop Pay.

Shop Pay relies on a payments processing service, such as Shopify Payments (the default option) or another payment provider, to process transactions.

As of 2024, Shop Pay had over 150 million registered users worldwide.

== History ==
In April 2017, Shopify announced the checkout feature called Shopify Pay. Later that same year, the company announced a new package tracking app, Arrive, which tracked customer orders from brands on the platform and other online shopping sources.

Early in 2020, a rebranded Shop Pay button appeared on participating checkouts; later that spring, Arrive was rebranded as Shop.

In February 2021, Shop Pay expanded to merchants selling on Facebook and Instagram, becoming available outside Shopify's own checkout for the first time.

In 2025, Shopify started operating in the countries of the European Union. The same year, Shop Pay was made available in 15 additional European countries.

== Services ==
=== Accelerated Checkout ===
Shop Pay's main service is accelerated checkout, which allows users to save their email, credit card, shipping, and billing information for one-click checkout experiences across Shopify-powered stores and other partner platforms. Shop Pay relies on a payments processing service, such as Shopify Payments, or other payment providers, to process these transactions.

=== Shop Pay Installments ===
Shop Pay Installments is a buy now, pay later solution for Shop Pay. The service is offered in partnership with Affirm Holdings, Inc.

=== Shop Cash ===
Shop Cash is Shop's rewards program, which gives customers who check out using Shop Pay 1% back. Shop Cash can be spent only on the Shop app or website.

== Availability ==
Shop Pay is available in Australia, Austria, Bulgaria, Belgium, Canada, Croatia, Cyprus, Czechia, Estonia, Denmark, Finland, France, Germany, Gibraltar, Greece, Hong Kong, Hungary, Ireland, Italy, Japan, Latvia, Liechtenstein, Lithuania, Luxembourg, Malta, Mexico, Netherlands, New Zealand, Norway, Poland, Portugal, Romania, Singapore, Slovenia, Spain, Sweden, Switzerland, the United Kingdom, and the United States.

== See also ==
- Digital wallet
- Amazon Pay
- Apple Pay
- Google Pay (payment method)
- PayPal
- Samsung Pay
- List of on-line payment service providers
