= Sleeping Giants =

Social media activism organization

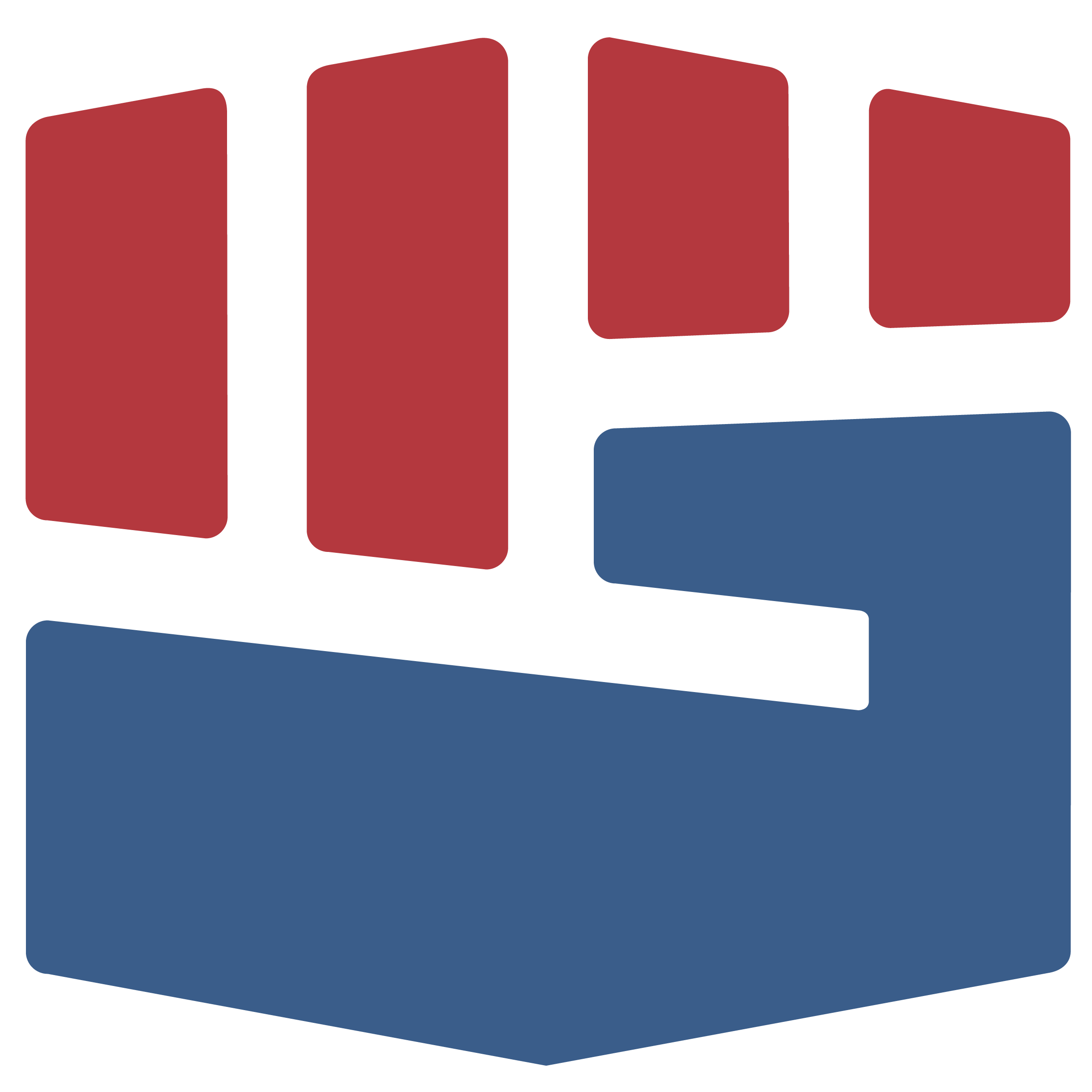
- Sleeping Giants logo
- Formation: November 2016; 10 years ago
- Founders: Matt Rivitz, Nandini Jammi
- Founded at: United States

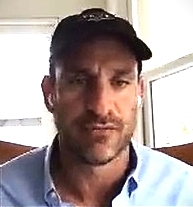
Matt Rivitz in 2022

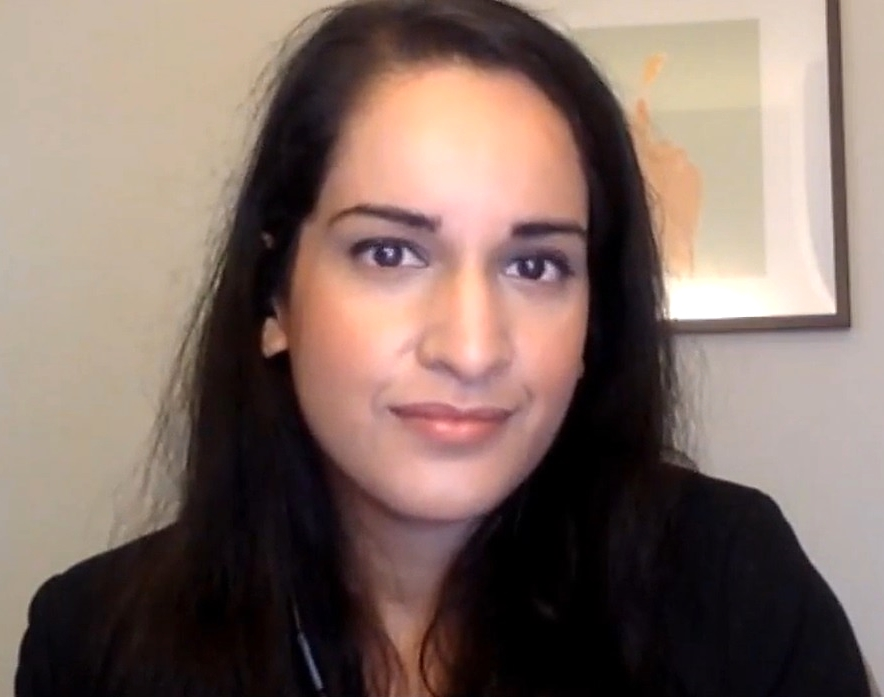
Nandini Jammi in 2020

Sleeping Giants is a social media activism organization aiming to pressure companies into removing advertisements from several conservative news outlets by publicly accusing them of malpractices such as misinformation and hate speech. The campaign started in November 2016, shortly after Donald Trump's victory in the 2016 United States presidential election, with the launch of a Twitter account aiming to boycott Breitbart News. The campaign has sections in Australia, Brazil, Canada, France and Germany.

The American campaign operated anonymously until The Daily Caller identified freelance copywriter Matt Rivitz as the founder, a story confirmed by Rivitz. Shortly afterward, a New York Times profile of Rivitz and freelance copywriter and marketing consultant Nandini Jammi said the two ran the campaign's Twitter account "along with other still anonymous contributors". Other reports identified Jammi as "co-founder". Jammi later left Sleeping Giants, saying that Rivitz "gaslighted me out of the movement we built together". The Daily Beast described this as an act for which Rivitz later apologised.

== Campaign against Breitbart News ==
The organization primarily operates from its Twitter account, and also has a Facebook account.

As of February 2017, 820 companies had joined the campaign and stopped advertising on Breitbart News, according to statistics provided by the organization. By May 2017, thousands of advertisers had stopped advertising with Breitbart. The list of advertisers includes Allstate, AT&T, Autodesk, BMW, Deutsche Telekom, HP Inc., Kellogg's, Lenovo, Lyft, Visa, Vimeo, Nest, and Warby Parker.

The Canadian government also stopped advertising on Breitbart News after declaring that its content "did not align with the Government's Code of Value and Ethics". Sleeping Giants' strategy combines traditional approaches to pressure advertisers with direct online activism, aiming to recruit and mobilize a large population of social media users. According to Slate, Sleeping Giants' strategy is similar to the one adopted in 2014 by the Gamergate movement against Gawker Media.

Breitbart News responded with a campaign to boycott Kellogg's products.

== Other campaigns ==
Sleeping Giants was involved in the campaign pressuring advertisers to drop The O'Reilly Factor after the discovery of five sexual harassment settlements by host Bill O'Reilly and Fox News, which resulted in the show's cancellation. The group also participated in organizing the boycott of The Ingraham Angle and pressured social networks to drop Alex Jones.

Since May 2017, the Canadian section has used the same methods to persuade advertisers to remove ads from Rebel News, a Canadian far-right media website.

The French section also campaigns in a similar manner with regard to the French far-right website Boulevard Voltaire.

An Australian section named Sleeping Giants Oz was established in August 2017. In August 2018, Sleeping Giants Oz called on advertisers to boycott Sky News Australia after it broadcast an interview with Blair Cottrell, an Australian far-right extremist.

A Brazilian section, Sleeping Giants Brasil, was established in May 2020. Sleeping Giants Brasil gained traction against Jornal da Cidade On-line, Conexão Política and Brasil Sem Medo, right-wing and conservative outlets which support Jair Bolsonaro. They also tried to defund Olavo de Carvalho's YouTube channel and online courses. Consequently PayPal decided to remove their services from Carvalho's online seminars upon violations of their terms and conditions of use due to his inflammatory rhetoric, polemic remarks and hate speech.

== See also ==
- Stop Funding Hate
- 2018 NRA boycott
