= Shopper =

Shopper may refer to:

- The Shopper, an Australian passenger train 1964–1975
- "Shopper" (song), by IU, 2024
- Pennysaver, a free community periodical in North America that advertises items for sale

== See also ==
- Schopper, a German surname
- Personal shopper
- Plastic shopping bag
- Shopping caddy
