= Shopping (disambiguation) =

Shopping is the act of visiting retailers to examine and purchase goods.

Shopping may also refer to:

== Film ==
- Shopping (1994 film), a British film by Paul W. S. Anderson
- Shopping (2013 film), a New Zealand film by Mark Albiston and Louis Sutherland

== Music ==
- Shopping (band), a British post-punk trio

=== Albums ===
- Shopping (Fann Wong album) or the title song, 1998
- Shopping (Inoue Yōsui and Okuda Tamio album) or the title song, 1997

=== Songs ===
- "Shopping" (Ryan Bang song), 2015
- "Shopping", by Barenaked Ladies from Everything to Everyone, 2003
- "Shopping", by the Jam, the B-side of "Beat Surrender", 1982
- "Shopping", by Pet Shop Boys from Actually, 1987
- "Shopping", by Saloon
- "Shopping", by Shonen Knife from Overdrive, 2014

== Other uses ==
- Shopping (Luleå), a shopping mall in Luleå, Sweden
- Shopping (novel), a 1998 novel by Gavin Kramer
