= Affirm Holdings =

American financial services company

Affirm Holdings, Inc.
- Type: Public
- Traded as: Nasdaq: AFRM (Class A); Russell 1000 component
- ISIN: US00827B1061
- Industry: Financial services; Financial technology; Buy now, pay later
- Founded: 2012; 14 years ago
- Founders: Max Levchin; Nathan Gettings; Jeffrey Kaditz; Alex Rampell
- Headquarters: 650 California Street, San Francisco, California, United States
- Area served: United States, Canada, United Kingdom, Australia
- Key people: Max Levchin (Chair, CEO); Libor Michalek (President); Michael Linford (President); Robert O'Hare (CFO)
- Products: List of products: Adaptive Checkout; AdaptAI; BoostAI; Split Pay; Affirm Card; Affirm Money Account; Affirm Edge
- Services: Buy now, pay later; Debit card; Savings account
- Revenue: ▲US$4.26 billion (2026)
- Operating income: ▲US$147 million (2026)
- Net income: ▲US$1.93 billion (2026)
- Total assets: ▲US$15.79 billion (2026)
- Total equity: ▲US$5.48 billion (2026)
- Members: ▲27.8 million users; ▲571,000 merchants; (2026)
- Number of employees: 2,358 (2026)
- Website: www.affirm.com
- Footnotes; Financials as of June 30, 2025,

Affirm Holdings, Inc. is an American financial technology company and a point-of-sale lender. Founded in 2012 by PayPal co-founder Max Levchin, it is the largest U.S. based buy now, pay later (BNPL) financier. As of 2026, Affirm reports nearly 28 million users and processes $50 billion in annual payments.

Affirm offers unsecured installment loans at the point-of-sale through various methods. These include payment links at checkout, virtual or physical cards, and integration into third-party digital wallets and banking apps. The company generates revenue by applying a service fee to sellers, charging interest to borrowers, or both, and does not charge a late fee. Affirm also offers a savings account and a debit card. The lender says its loan underwriting involves evaluating transactions by considering credit scores and other pertinent factors, while also incorporating machine learning. Affirm's services are available in the U.S., Canada, the U.K and Australia.

== History ==
=== 2012–2015: Early years ===
Affirm was founded in 2012 by Max Levchin, Nathan Gettings, Jeffrey Kaditz, and Alex Rampell as part of the initial portfolio of startup studio HVF. Levchin, who co-founded PayPal, became CEO of Affirm in 2014.

=== 2016–2019: Merchant partnerships ===
In November 2016, Affirm announced the availability of its buy now, pay later (BNPL) service for retailers using the e-commerce platforms of "Kibo Commerce", BigCommerce, "AspDotNetStorefront" and Zen Cart. By that time, Affirm's service was also available for the Salesforce Commerce Cloud, Magento and Shopify. According to Racked in November 2017, Affirm had launched an app which allowed consumers to take out loans for purchases at any retailer. The company aimed at "building and perfecting a new underwriting system", powered by machine learning, to determine consumer creditworthiness. Racked added that the four retailers it spoke to reported "significantly higher sales and more frequent purchases, with Affirm customers". Affirm's use of machine learning in underwriting has also been claimed by the lender to generate "higher loan approval rate compared to its competitors", while ensuring the borrower can "comfortably repay". In 2018, CBS News cited Affirm's BNPL service as an alternative to the traditional credit card, while expressing a caution about the interest rates charged by BNPL services.

Affirm announced a partnership with Walmart in February 2019. Under the partnership, the company's service became available to customers at self-checkout kiosks in store and on the Walmart website.

=== 2020: Initial public offering ===
On November 18, 2020, Affirm filed with the Securities and Exchange Commission in preparation for an initial public offering (IPO). On December 12, 2020, it was reported that Affirm had postponed its IPO. On January 13, 2021, Affirm listed on the Nasdaq with symbol AFRM, raising about $1.2 billion in its IPO. By the next day, the price of shares had doubled, making Levchin's stake worth about US$2.5 billion.

=== 2021–2022: Growth ===
In May 2021, Affirm acquired Returnly, a financial technology service company, for US$300 million.

In August 2021, Affirm announced a partnership with Amazon to make its BNPL service available for certain customers of the latter. According to CNBC in October 2021, Affirm had partnered with Target, and also with Apple, to offer financing services. In November 2021, Affirm announced the expansion of its partnership with Amazon, and said that it would be Amazon's exclusive BNPL partner in the United States up to January 2023. In December 2021, the Consumer Financial Protection Bureau (CFPB) said that it was opening an inquiry into BNPL companies including Affirm, Afterpay, Klarna and others. The bureau said that it was particularly concerned about how these payment providers impacted consumer debt accumulation, what consumer protection laws applied and how the companies harvested data. In response, many of the companies, including Affirm, said that they welcomed the CFPB's investigation.

In May 2022, Affirm signed a partnership with digital payments processor Stripe, Inc. to make its "adaptive checkout" service available to Stripe users in the US. In June 2022, Reuters mentioned Affirm as the "biggest BNPL firm in the United States" while noting that the "rising rates" then would hurt BNPL firms and that Apple's entry to the BNPL sector created "more competition". In the same month, according to a Los Angeles Times report, the "securitization packages" of Affirm's BNPL loans were falling in price for investors to buy while becoming more expensive to issue. This was said to happen at the time when rising rates and a cost-of-living crisis were casting a shadow over the BNPL sector. Additionally, the report cited Affirm as an unsecured loan lender which funded about a third of its business through securitizations. In September 2022, Yahoo! Finance reported on the launch of Amazon's partnership with Affirm in Canada, and stated that Affirm's network served nearly 14 million customers and 235,000 merchants. According to Payments Dive in October 2022, Bank of America Securities identified Affirm as the "most frequently used" BNPL app in the US with a 30% market share, while noting a slowdown in BNPL sector growth in the US and worldwide.

=== 2023: Layoff ===
In February 2023, Affirm announced it would lay off 19 percent of its workforce as part of a restructuring plan and shut down its crypto unit.

In March 2023, U.S. News & World Report cited Affirm as a "lower-interest alternative to a credit card", available for both in-store or online purchases, while also stating that "it has downsides". According to a Payments Dive article in May 2023, Affirm stated that it was partnering with data analytics company FICO to create a "BNPL credit-scoring model", while noting the CFPB's concerns around the "lack of information being furnished in the BNPL space". The article also cited Affirm as the "largest independent BNPL provider" based in the United States.

In May 2023, payment processor Worldpay launched a partnership with Affirm, enabling Worldpay merchants to use Affirm's payment services. The company reported over 17 million consumers and 279,000 merchants, and processed an annual gross merchandise volume (GMV) of $20.2bn for its fiscal year ending June 30, 2023. Then, in September 2023, online travel platform Booking.com joined Affirm's payment network, which also included American Airlines, Cathay Pacific, CheapOair and Vacasa. In November 2023, CNBC reported that Amazon was expanding its partnership with Affirm to allow small business owners who use Amazon's online store to lend Affirm's loans. The expansion was said to be aimed at sole proprietors, cited by CNBC as the most common form of business ownership in the U.S. That same month, Affirm announced a similar partnership, this time with Best Buy, and the launch of a spending account tied to its debit card. The company's President, Libor Michalek, stated that the account would offer savings account-type interest, ATM access and "direct deposit" capability.

=== 2024–2025: International expansion ===
According to Reuters in April 2024, Affirm had started offering buy now, pay later loans for elective medical procedures. Affirm stated that the share of transactions in this category at 0% annual interest was nearly half, a higher proportion compared to other categories.

In May 2024, the company reported having 18.1 million "active users" and 292,000 "active merchant clients". That same month, the CFPB announced that it would apply some of the same consumer protection rules on BNPL lenders that applied to credit card companies. The new rule was said to require BNPL lenders including Affirm to investigate customer disputes, refund products that have been returned, and provide periodic billing statements — all requirements that credit card companies complied under the Truth in Lending Act. The CFPB added that the new rule was open to comments until August 1, 2024 and set to be "effective in 60 days". May 2024 also saw Google announce the expansion of its partnerships with Affirm and Zip, following an initial pilot earlier in the year. These partnerships involved showing buy now, pay later options from Affirm and Zip when checking out online with Google Pay. The expansion included a roll out of these options to additional "merchant sites and Android apps" for the U.S. users. In the same month, CNBC called Affirm's savings account the "Best For Simplicity".

In June 2024, Apple announced a partnership with Affirm, allowing U.S. users to apply for Affirm's loans through Apple Pay, and subsequently revealed plans to shut down its own "Pay Later" service. According to CNBC, Affirm was slated to "surface" as an option for U.S. Apple Pay users on iPhones and iPads later in the year. In the same month, the company also announced that its customers may have been affected by a data breach at partner bank Evolve Bank & Trust. Affirm added that its systems were not compromised and Affirm card holders could continue using their cards.

In August 2024, Affirm reported processing $26.6bn in GMV for its fiscal year ending June 30, 2024. In September 2024, the company's installment loans became available to shoppers using Apple Pay, as part of the previously announced partnership between Affirm and Apple. Affirm said it processed $28bn in GMV for the year ending September 30, 2024.

In November 2024, Affirm launched its installment loans in the U.K. with interest-free as well as interest-bearing monthly payment options. Among the first merchants offering Affirm as a payment method in the U.K. were Alternative Airlines, the flight booking website, and payments processing firm Fexco. The company also appointed Robert O'Hare as its Chief Financial Officer (CFO), following an earlier announcement to promote Michael Linford, the then-CFO, to the new position of Chief Operating Officer (COO). That same month, Affirm also stated it accounted for a third of the payment value and over half of the revenue in the U.S. BNPL sector.

In February 2025, Affirm and Shopify extended their partnership beyond the U.S., maintaining Affirm as Shopify's exclusive pay-over-time provider. As part of this expansion, Shop Pay Installments launched in Canada, with preparations underway for rollouts in the U.K., Australia, France, Germany and the Netherlands. That same month, Affirm also partnered with FIS to offer pay-over-time services to FIS's banking clients and their customers. It was reported that the partnership would enable banks working with FIS to offer their own version of the "Affirm Card", allowing consumers to access Affirm's installment plans with payments automatically deducted from their checking accounts.

In March 2025, Affirm was replaced by its competitor Klarna as the exclusive BNPL provider at Walmart. This change came after Walmart-backed OnePay was allowed to acquire shares of Klarna through an arrangement. Affirm stated at that time that its partnership with Walmart had generated about 5% of Affirm's GMV and nearly 2% of its adjusted operating income in the second half of 2024, and that Affirm's products were also available via other means such as the Affirm Card. That same month, JPMorgan Chase's payments unit announced a partnership with Affirm, making the latter's BNPL options available at the point of checkout for the bank's network of merchants. These BNPL options would facilitate purchases up to $30,000 while offering repayment periods up to five years. In May 2025, Costco announced a partnership with Affirm to provide Affirm's installment payment options to Costco's customers when making online purchases. The options were available for purchases ranging from $500 to $17,500, and included several monthly payment plans for customers to choose from.

For the year ended June 30, 2025, Affirm reported $3.22 billion in revenue, $52.2 million in net income and an operating loss of $87.3 million, while processing consumer purchases worth $36.7 billion in GMV. The company also said it had $11.15 billion in total assets and $3.07 billion in total stockholders' equity by the end of June 2025. There were 24.1 million consumers and 419,000 merchants using Affirm's services as of September 2025, according to the company.

Also in June 2025, Affirm was added to Russell 1000 Growth Index.

=== 2026–present: Diversification ===
In late January 2026, Affirm submitted an application to the Nevada Financial Institutions Division and the FDIC to establish an industrial loan company, to be called Affirm Bank. Max Levchin clarified that the underlying motivation was to gain regularity clarity for the company and its partners. He also identified the application as a long-term investment rather than an immediate growth opportunity, stating that the approval could take many years and the outcomes were uncertain.

In February 2026, Affirm reported that it had 25.8 million active consumers, 3.7 million active card holders and 478,000 active merchants, by the end of 2025. In this month, the company signed exclusive distribution deals to get its buy now, pay later loans on Intuit's Quickbooks Payments system and Expedia's platform. Affirm also announced a pilot program allowing some customers to split monthly rent into two payments. The lender said it was not charging renters interest or fees to use the service, but may charge landlords.

In August 2026, Affirm reported 27.8 million customers, 5.2 million card holders, 571,000 active merchants and 2,358 employees. For the full fiscal year ended June 30, 2026, the company processed $50.2 billion in payments, reported annual revenue of $4.26 billion, operating income of $147 million, and net income of $1.93 billion. As of June 30, 2026, Affirm had total assets of $15.79 billion and total equity of $5.48 billion, respectively. In August 2026, the company also appointed Linford as President and announced the availability of Affirm-powered Shop Pay Installments in Australia.

== Business ==
Affirm places its installment payment options in the checkout stage — either online or at self-checkout kiosks in physical stores or in a digital wallet — while determining the shopper's loan eligibility in real-time. Affirm also provides a "virtual card" to consumers to pay for purchases in any online store as well as a physical debit card for use in any store, physical or online.

Affirm raises funding from banks, insurance firms and the capital markets to front up loans. The company makes money by earning a commission from merchants and by charging interest on the loans opted for by the consumers. The commission earned from merchants can sometimes be as high as 12.5%. The interest rates and other loan terms vary, depending on consumers and the merchants they purchase from, according to Affirm. The annual percentage rates (APRs) for the loan interest range from 0% to 36%, the upper limit for the loan is $25,000, and the payback period ranges from 1 to 60 months. Although the lender does not charge late fees, late payments could prevent the borrower from obtaining future loans from Affirm and may also affect their credit score. Affirm says it doesn't charge compound interest and caps its interest.

Affirm states that it evaluates transactions by considering various factors beyond just credit scores, including the time of day and other nuanced details, to assess risk. The company also says that it deters fraud by leveraging an "artificial intelligence-driven analytics system" which attempts to predict a given transaction's likelihood of fraud based on past warning signs.

== Products ==
Affirm's products are designed for merchants, shoppers, and banks.

Among the products offered to merchants is Adaptive Checkout which offers personalized payment options to online shoppers based on user profiles and shopping cart contents. Using real-time algorithms, it presents pre-approved payment plans with bi-weekly or monthly installments for the shoppers to compare and choose one from. The company also offers an AI-powered promotion platform for merchants, called AdaptAI, that allows retailers to offer rewards to shoppers. Those rewards can include exclusive APR rates, special repayment terms or immediate cash savings, according to Affirm. Affirm also offers BoostAI to merchants, which runs automated A/B tests and deploys merchant-funded incentives. According to the company, BoostAI allows merchants to allocate incremental capital to shape financing offers while Affirm determines how best to deploy the capital.

Affirm provides multiple interest-free products to online shoppers. These include Split Pay which offers a bi-weekly Pay in 4 option, a Pay in 2 which allows to split the cost of a purchase into two payments, and a Pay in 30 which allows to pay in full within 30 days of a purchase. The company also provides an Affirm Card to consumers. This card is for use in both physical stores and online, like a regular debit card. It allows consumers to convert debit transactions ranging from $100 to $1,000 into installment payments within 24 hours through an app. The card is connected to the user's bank account, providing an alternative payment method. Additionally, Affirm offers a savings account, called the Affirm Money Account, to consumers. This account pays 3.85% annual interest and has no minimum balance or fee requirements. The account is FDIC insured up to $250,000 per depositor in the event of a bank failure, and is held by Cross River Bank.

Affirm Edge is a product for banks that allows them to embed Affirm's buy now, pay later and installment loans directly into their banking apps.
