= Ghassan Halazon =

Jordanian-Canadian entrepreneur

- Citizenship: Canadian; Jordanian
- Education: MBA, Georgetown University; BCOM, McGill University
- Occupation: Entrepreneur
- Title: Founder, CEO, Emerge Commerce

Ghassan Halazon is a Jordanian-Canadian technology and e-commerce entrepreneur. He founded EMERGE Commerce, Inc., a Toronto based acquirer and operator of direct-to-consumer e-commerce brands.

== Life ==
Halazon was born and raised in Amman, Jordan. He attended McGill University in Montreal, Quebec, and holds an MBA from Georgetown University. He currently resides in Toronto, Ontario.

== Career ==
Halazon worked with Citigroup as an investment banker in New York before his foray into e-commerce and technology startups that began in 2010.

He founded his most recent venture, EMERGE Commerce Inc., formerly Transformational Capital Corp., an e-commerce consolidator, in 2016.

EMERGE Commerce completed its public listing on the Toronto Venture Exchange on December 14, 2020, under ticker TSXV: ECOM.

Halazon is a member in the Board of Directors of the Canadian Arab Institute.

== Public speaking ==
In 2011, Halazon presented a talk at the TEDx Talk Dead Sea. In 2018, he presented a talk at the TechTO conference entitled 'Beyond the Wreckage. In November 2018, Halazon was a speaker at the Harvard Arab Conference.

== Media appearances ==
In 2011, Halazon was listed among Canada's 30 most eligible bachelors by Canada's National Post.

Halazon appeared on the Canadian version of the entrepreneurship reality TV show "Dragon's Den," and attributed some of his success with TeamBuy to the exposure gained through the show.

== Philanthropy ==
Halazon sits on the Board of Directors of the Be-Abled Society, a non-profit organization that assists people with non-visible disabilities transition back into everyday life.
