= Shop, Rajasthan =

Village in Rajasthan, India

Shop
- Town
- Location in Rajasthan, India
- Coordinates: 25.892296°N 76.210446°E
- Country: India
- State: Rajasthan
- Division: Ajmer
- District: Tonk
- Tehsil: Uniara

Government
  - Type: Gram panchayat

Area
  - Total: 2,262.89 km^{2} (873.71 sq mi)

Population (2011)
  - Total: 5,482
  - Density: 2.423/km^{2} (6.274/sq mi)

Languages
  - Official: Hindi
- Time zone: UTC+5:30 (IST)
- PIN: 304023
- ISO 3166 code: IN-RJ
- Vehicle registration: RJ-26

Shop is a village located in Uniara Tehsil of Tonk, a district of the state of Rajasthan in Western India.

== Geography ==
Shop is located at 25.892296°N 76.210446°E, and covers a total area of 2262.89 km^{2}.

Shop is situated to the north of Uniyara Tehsil and five kilometers west of Delhi-Mumbai Expressway.

== Historical places ==
Shop has a palatial stepwell made of curved stairs and huge rocks. Talghar Lal Chowk and Lal Bazaar Bhawan Kund are built inside this stepwell. This is famous as the stepwell of Singhasha Baba.

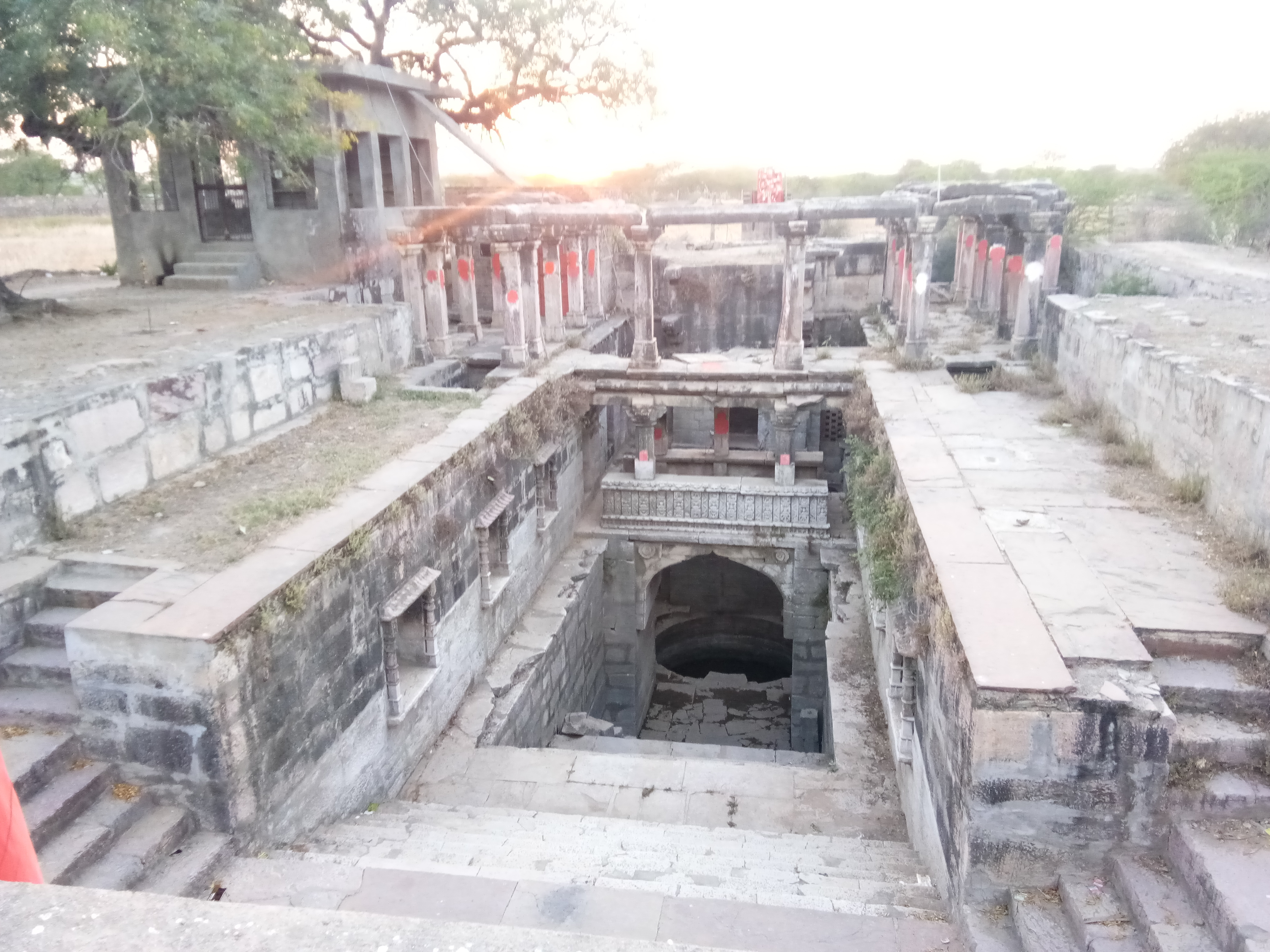
Image of bawdi

== Demographics ==
The total population of Shop is 5,482, with 3,835 voters.

Kiskanda Bai won the sarpanch post in the Gram panchayat elections for 2020.

There are two dhanis here: Manoharpura Malian and Khanjar Dhani.

The town still employs the caste system. Some of the major castes at Shop include Dhakad, Meena, Gurjar, and Mali.

== Economy ==
Shop's economy is agrarian. SCrops produced include wheat and mustard, which are grown as rabi crops; and Urad, mung, maize and millet, which are grown as kharif crops. The village also has a pond (Amalia), where singhara is cultivated.

Shop has five Anganwadi centers, two banks (Gramin Bank and Indian Iverseas Bank), and a sub tehsil office. There is a hospital.
