= Health information on the Internet =

Use of the Internet to publish or share health information

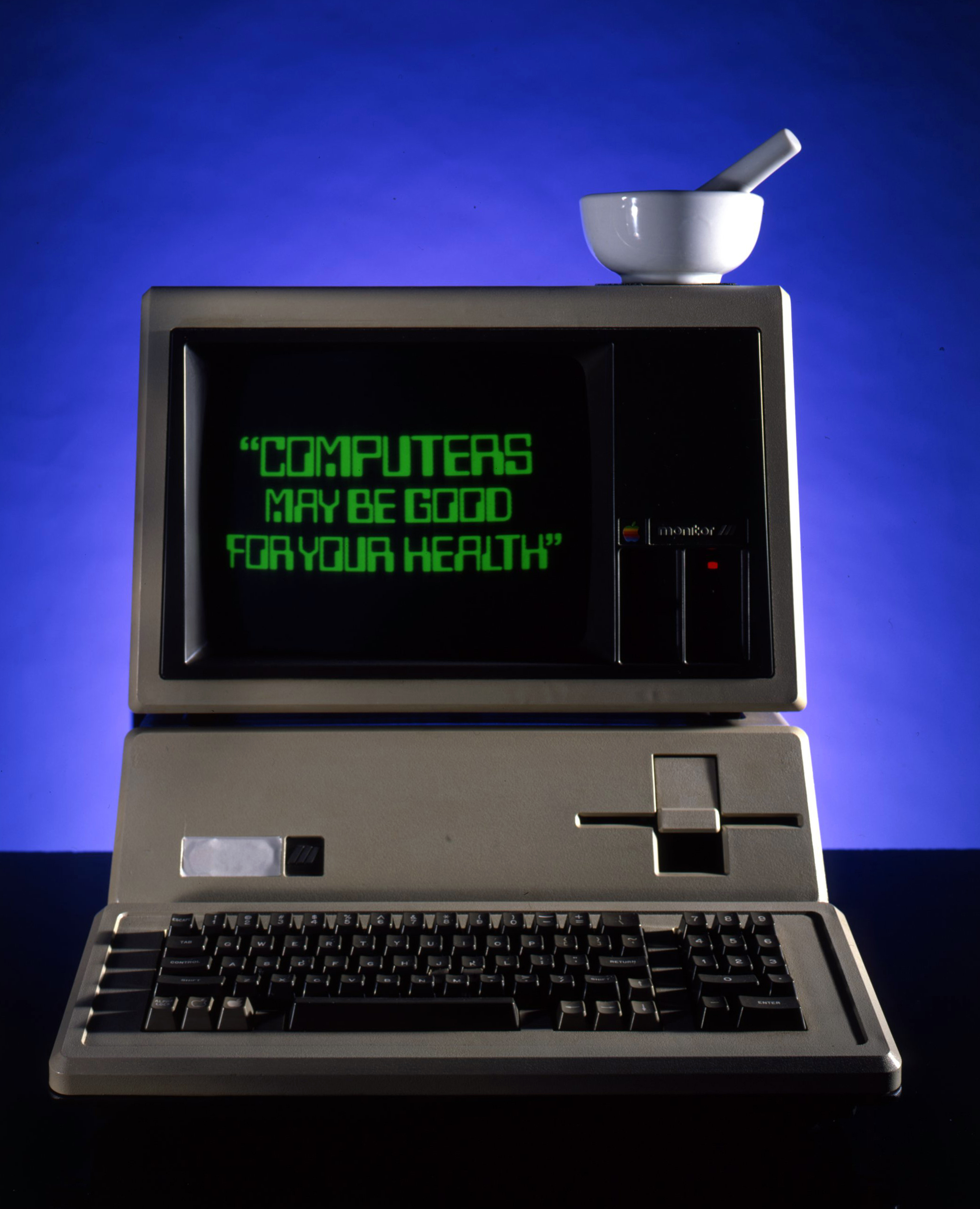
A 1984 United States advertisement for access to health information with the 1980s Apple III

Health information on the Internet refers to all health-related information communicated through or available on the Internet.

== Description ==
The Internet is widely used by the general public as a tool for finding health information. In the late 1990s, researchers noted an increase in Internet users' access to health-related content despite the variation in the quality of information, level of accessibility, and overall health literacy. Access to health information does not guarantee understanding, as health literacy of individuals vary.

It is believed patients who know their medical history may learn and interpret this information in a way that benefits them. This, however, is not always the case because online health information is not always peer reviewed. Physicians worry that patients who conduct Internet research on their medical history are at a risk of being misinformed. In 2013, the opinions about the relationship between health care providers and online health information were still being established. According to a 2014 study, "The flow of information has fundamentally changed, and physicians have less control over health information relayed to patients. Not surprisingly, this paradigm shift has elicited varied and sometimes conflicting views about the value of the Internet as a tool to improve health care."

== Importance of the physician-patient relationship ==
In cases in which a physician has difficulty explaining complicated medical concepts to a patient, that patient may be inclined to seek information on the internet. A consensus exists that patients should have shared decision making, meaning that patients should be able to make informed decisions about the direction of their medical treatment in collaboration with their physician. Rich, educated, and socially advantaged patients may enjoy the benefits of the shared decision-making approach more than those with a lower socioeconomic class or minority status.

Patients' naive understanding of their health contributes to a range of issues, including the tendency to deviate from the physician's medical advice or to miss medical appointments. Patients with limited access to health information are more likely to use complementary and alternative medicine, and fail to inform their physician about it. Complementary and alternative medicine may not be evidence-based medicine. While physicians can work on improving their doctor-patient communication skills, individuals can become more knowledgeable about their health through patient education programs. A study by Lorig in 2002 suggested healthcare processes can be efficiently improved with patients' behavior.

== Social media ==
Social forums in which anyone can have conversations about health with their peers exist; these are especially popular among patients who want to talk about shared medical concerns with others. Those who participate in online communities that discuss health issues report feeling relieved about their health worries, perceiving they have more control over their health and medical condition, gaining more medical knowledge, and having more personal agency overall.

Some research studies have failed to find evidence to validate the physicians' concerns about patients receiving misinformation online or using online health information to conduct self-diagnosis. Patients with chronic diseases who use the Internet to get health-related information often acquire good skills to judge the quality of information that they find.

Social media platforms are considered channels physicians can use to acquire insight on their patients' thoughts. Patients have increasingly turned to social media for health information, sometimes of dubious quality. Several studies have used social media to gather data on patients' adverse drug reactions (ADRs) with generally promising results.

Some commercial organizations use health information gathered from the Internet, raising serious ethical and privacy concerns, including the risk of accidental violations of the patient privacy by healthcare providers.

=== Health awareness ===
Social media is being increasingly used for health awareness. It is not only used to promote health and wellness but also to motivate and guide public for various disease and ailments. Use of social media was proven to be cornerstone for awareness during COVID-19 management. In recent times, it is one of the most cost effective tool for cardiovascular health awareness since it can be used to motivate people for adoption of healthy lifestyle practices. Over the span of a decade, and Doctor Mike utilized social media to significantly impact the public about cardiovascular health awareness.

== Academic medical literature ==
The written record of peer-reviewed medical consensus is stored in scientific journals. There has been an academic journal publishing reform since the advent of electronic publishing. Although some journals have adopted an open access template for online users, other journals are opposed to a widening of open access publishing. The open-access policy has significantly increased the accessibility of professional health information to researchers, physicians, and the public through the Internet. Some of the academic medical literature, however, may not be peer-reviewed and users are advised to exercise caution when reading health-related articles from such websites.

== Quality ==
The nature of health-related information available on the Internet is complex and its quality varies greatly by source. The standards for ensuring quality control on the Internet have been criticized and no single standard is universally accepted. Many researchers have investigated this issue in detail, resulting in a wide range of theories from different disciplines.

One study found that a correct diagnosis given by the average online symptom checker happened only 34% of the time. Triage recommendations (i.e., whether immediate, normal, or self-type of care is needed) were also assessed and found to be correct 50% of the time. Quality of health information on the internet becomes important in this context as both misdiagnosis and inaccurate recommendations for triage are possible. Additionally, most online diagnostic tools fail to account for the user's familial and personal medical history, including current diagnoses and conditions they possess.

== Personal health information ==
For many applications, people wish to use health information on the Internet to gain further insight about a personal health concern. Because of this, the goal is often to use the Internet to find information as it is described in a person's medical record. In 2013, 72% of US adults used the internet to search for health information. Since the advent of electronic media, medical records have been increasingly kept as electronic medical records. More healthcare professionals rely on electronic medical records because it is a favorable means for patients to access their personal health information. These comprehensive systems allow patients to easily access their records without a doctor's visit, view interactive patient education materials, and use a greater range of health services such as renewing a medical prescription or making an appointment online All medical records are protected health information because sharing personal health information exposes an individual to a range of harm that may result from a violation of their expectation of privacy. Some privacy risks include an increased likelihood of medical identity theft, termination of disability coverage and unauthorized use of advanced medical research by third parties.

As of 2000, there is a broad international debate about ways to balance patient and commercial medicine demands for personal health information with an individual's needs for safety and respect.

=== Electronic medical records ===
An electronic medical record is a medical record stored on electronic media, for example, computer servers or hard-drives.

=== De-identification ===
De-identification is an attempt to remove patients' identifiable information from their medical records with the intent of making the information transferable without compromising patients' identities. The closer the data is to anonymization, the lesser its value to those who want it. Research companies and digital advertising companies are among the third parties that use such information in a variety of ways, which include using these patient datasets to reach their target audiences, formulate new medications or collect genetic data for government surveillance. Patients' data is rarely fully anonymized. Many controversies regarding the de-identification of patient's data exist.

=== Research using personal health information ===
There is a high commercial demand for accessing extensive collections of various types of personal health care information.

=== Distribution of collections of personal health information ===
In 2014 National Health Service (NHS) in the United Kingdom proposed selling patients' personal health information. In 2013, however, various groups had expressed worries over dangers resulting from the distribution of patients' identifiable information along with their medical history.

== Major sources of information ==
=== Mobile apps ===
Mobile apps are highly variable in the quality of health information they offer. 95% of cancer information mobile apps targeted at health care workers had scientifically valid information. In contrast, only 32% of cancer information apps aimed at the general public had valid information. Health apps have not been subject to much regulation or oversight. For example, an app by wellness blogger Belle Gibson promoting alternative, unproven cancer therapies was downloaded over 200,000 times in its first month after its 2013 debut. It reached a rank of #1 in the Apple App Store and was voted Apple's Best Food and Drink App of 2013. Gibson later admitted that she had never had cancer, as she had claimed when marketing the app.

=== PubMed ===
PubMed is a free search engine that primarily lists the MEDLINE database of peer-reviewed references and abstracts on life sciences and biomedical topics maintained by the United States National Library of Medicine at the National Institutes of Health. Although PubMed does not provide full-text journal articles directly, its records may include links to full-text versions available through publishers' websites or PubMed Central.

=== User-generated content ===
In 2014, Wikipedia was described as "the leading single source of healthcare information for patients and healthcare professionals". The information available on Wikipedia may not be peer-reviewed. Other wiki-style website exist to promulgate medical and heath-related information.

== Regulation ==
In the United States, the Food and Drug Administration offers guidance for health industry organizations that share information online. However, such guidance does not necessarily ensure that the information shared online is technically accessible, as research on prescription drug websites has identified widespread potential accessibility issues.
