= Emerge Commerce =

EMERGE Commerce Ltd.
- Formerly: Transformation Capital
- Type: Public
- Industry: E-commerce
- Founded: 2015
- Founder: Ghassan Halazon
- Headquarters: Toronto, Ontario
- Areas served: Canada, United States
- Brands: trulocal.ca, wholesalepet.com, UnderPar.com, BattlBox.com, WagJag.com, justgolfstuff.ca, Carnivoreclub.co, Berightback.ca
- Number of employees: 115
- Website: emerge-commerce.com

EMERGE Commerce Ltd. (formerly Transformational Capital) is a North American acquirer and operator of niche e-commerce brands with 2M members founded by Ghassan Halazon which operates eight brands. The Company operates various marketplaces and subscription services across wide-ranging categories such as pets products, meat & groceries, golf, and other experiences. The Company is headquartered in Toronto, Canada.

== Brands ==
=== WholesalePet.com ===
On November 16, 2021, EMERGE Commerce Ltd. acquired WholesalePet.com, a U.S. based B2B pet -marketplace matching 8,000 retailers and 400 vendors.

=== BattlBox Group ===
On October 6, 2021, EMERGE Commerce Ltd. acquired BattlBox Group, a U.S. based subscription-based ecommerce portfolio that includes BattlBox.com, an outdoor gear subscription box, and CarnivoreClub.co, an artisanal meat subscription box.

=== truLOCAL.ca ===
A locally sourced meat subscription service based in Kitchener, Ont., has been acquired by Canadian e-commerce company Emerge Commerce for approximately $16.8 million. TruLOCAL allows customers to order regular boxes of products – such as grass-fed beef, wild-caught salmon, and chicken raised without antibiotics – from Canadian suppliers. The company generated revenue of $19.8 million in the 12 months ending Dec. 31, 2020, representing year-over-year growth of 130 per cent.

=== UnderPar.com and JustGolfStuff.ca ===
In November 2019, EMERGE Commerce Ltd. acquired UnderPar (UnderPar.com and JustGolfStuff.ca) for $12 million. It is based in Toronto with an office in San Diego.

=== WagJag ===
WagJag (Wagjag.com) is a deal-of-the-day site which operates in Canada and is the largest family offers player in Ontario. Prior to being acquired by Emerge Commerce in November 2017, WagJag was owned by Metroland Media Group, a subsidiary of Torstar Corporation, the parent Company of the Toronto Star.

=== BeRightBack.ca ===
BeRightBack.ca is dedicated nearby escapes and staycations portal, offering limited-time offers on hotels next door. The site was launched in 2020, as a sister site to WagJag.com

=== Buytopia.ca ===
Buytopia is a deal-of-the-day site founded by Michele Romanow. Buytopia's team previously sold their grocery cashback app to Groupon in 2014.

=== Shop.ca ===
Shop.ca was initially a Canadian e-commerce site launched in June 2011. The company had raised CA$72M in venture capital funding; however, was spending more to acquire a customer that the average customer spent. As a result, the company entered legal restructuring in July 2016 due to a lack of funds to continue operating. EMERGE acquired Shop.ca's assets via legal restructuring and re-launched Shop.ca as a Content & Coupons marketing platform
