= Brand safety =

Set of measures

Brand safety is a set of measures that aim to protect the image and reputation of brands from the negative or damaging influence of questionable or inappropriate content when advertising online.

In response to ads being placed next to undesirable content, companies have cut advertising budgets, and pulled ads from online advertising and social media platforms.

== Types of unsafe environments ==
The global digital advertising industry considers the "Dirty Dozen" categories to avoid:

1. Domain Name Abuse
2. Traffic Diversion
3. Trademark Infringement
4. Trademark Dilution
5. Offensive Content
6. Brand Disparagement/Feedback
7. Claimed Affiliations
8. Affiliate/Partner Compliance
9. Unlicensed/Unauthorized Sales
10. Product Counterfeiting
11. Digital Piracy
12. Identity Theft & Fraud

The Interactive Advertising Bureau (IAB) added a 13th category: fake news. In addition, companies will often define specific unsafe categories based on the brand itself.

Some online advertising tools allow advertisers to avoid their ads appearing alongside unwanted contexts. This feature is typically referred to as brand safety. For example, within the Google Marketing Platform, additional protection can be set up using Campaign Manager 360. If the automated auction still chooses an advertiser's ad as relevant for placement alongside certain contexts, instead of the actual creative, a default image set by the advertiser will be displayed.

== Brand safety measures ==
To ensure brand safety, advertisers can buy ad space directly from trusted publishers, allowing them to directly address brand safety concerns. Advertisers and publishers may also employ third-party vendors of brand safety services that can be integrated into the advertising system. Other common preventive measures are black-lists of unsafe sites to avoid, or a white-lists of safe sites for advertising. The ads.txt (Authorized Digital Sellers) initiative from the IAB is designed to allow online media buyers to check the validity of the sellers from whom they buy.

Ad agencies, such as The Interpublic Group of Companies and Comscore, have used media watchdog companies like Ad Fontes Media and NewsGuard to make sure that their clients' ads are placed with "credible" news sources. In 2019, the World Federation of Advertisers formed the Global Alliance for Responsible Media (GARM), a cross-industry group of advertisers, advertising agencies, and industry associations seeking to improve digital safety and target "harmful and misleading content."

In the United States, these watchdogs have faced criticism from conservatives for allegedly displaying a bias against right-wing media outlets. In 2024, WFA was forced to shut down GARM due to legal costs, after it faced antitrust lawsuits from Rumble and X alleging that industry groups had colluded to withhold advertising from the sites due to their content. The House Oversight Committee launched an investigation into NewsGuard, seeking to survey its "[impact] on protected First Amendment speech and its potential to serve as a non-transparent agent of censorship campaigns."

In 2025, stemming initially from complaints by conservative media company Newsmax, the Federal Trade Commission (FTC) under chairman Andrew Ferguson began to take action against coordinated brand safety policies targeting platforms based on their ideology. In June 2025, the FTC imposed a consent decree on the merger of ad agencies Omnicom Group and Interpublic Group (IPG), requiring that the merged company not use third-party services that evaluate media outlets based on "viewpoints as to the veracity of news reporting and adherence to journalistic standards or ethics"—a condition targeting services such as NewsGuard. Furthermore, the FTC filed a complaint with WPP, Publicis, and Dentsu that similarly accused the companies of colluding on brand safety guidance in violation of the Sherman Antitrust Act, thereby "[limiting] competition in the market for ad-buying services and [depriving] advertisers of the benefits of differentiated brand-safety standards that could be tailored to their unique advertising inventory". The companies reached a consent decree in April 2026, prohibiting them from "engaging in agreements that would set common brand safety standards or restrict advertising based on biased and politically motivated criteria."

== See also ==
- Reputation management
