= Riverty =

German financial technology company

- Type: Subsidiary
- Industry: Financial technology, Financial services
- Predecessor: Arvato Financial Solutions
- Founded: 2022 (rebranding; origins in the 1960s)
- Headquarters: Gütersloher Str. 123, Verl, Germany
- Key people: Andreas Barth (CEO)
- Products: Buy Now, Pay Later (BNPL), debt collection, accounting services
- Number of employees: 4,000+
- Parent: Bertelsmann
- Website: www.riverty.com

Riverty (legally Riverty Group GmbH) is a German financial technology company. It operates as the fintech arm of the global media and services company Bertelsmann SE & Co. KGaA and provides a range of services, including Buy Now, Pay Later (BNPL), accounting services, and debt management.

The company was established through the rebranding of Arvato Financial Solutions in 2022, consolidating several legacy financial services brands under the Riverty name.

In 2026, Riverty obtained an EU CRR banking licence to launch Riverty Bank in Luxembourg, expanding the company from a licensed payment institution into a fully regulated credit institution offering embedded payment, credit, and liquidity services.

== History ==
Riverty was founded in 1961 as a B2B factoring business supporting the printing and publishing operations of the Bertelsmann group. By the late 1990s, the business had expanded significantly, serving international clients and offering financial management, warehousing, and IT services under the Arvato brand. In the 2000s, Arvato Financial Solutions expanded into credit risk management, fraud prevention, debt collection, and emerging consumer payment products, including BNPL.

In 2005, Arvato joint-ventured with Infoscore, Germany's credit agency and debt collection provider, integrating its data and accounts receivable services. In 2013, the company acquired Gothia Financial Group, a Nordic provider of invoice and debt management services. In 2014, Arvato Financial Solutions continued its expansion by acquiring Dutch payment services provider Afterpay, adding BNPL capabilities to its suite of services. In the same year, the company also established Infoscore Nederland B.V. In 2020, the company underwent several portfolio adjustments: the “Auskunftei” business was carved out and sold to global information services company Experian, and the German debt collection arm was rebranded as Paigo. Additionally, Arvato Financial Solutions acquired a majority stake in the Swiss MF Group. In 2022, Arvato Financial Solutions simplified its business by merging its various brands, like AfterPay and Paigo, under one brand roof called Riverty.

Riverty received the Red Dot Design Award in the Brands & Communication Design category in 2023. In October 2024, the company's Dutch subsidiary, Riverty Services Netherlands B.V., was registered in the Netherlands’ official Incassoregister, allowing it to operate as a debt collection service provider. In the same year, Riverty received regulatory approval from the German Federal Financial Supervisory Authority (BaFin) under the German Credit Servicing Act (KrZwMG), allowing the company to provide regulated credit servicing activities in Germany. Riverty partnered with companies like Mollie and Adyen to make its "buy now, pay later" services available on more online shopping websites.

In May 2026, Riverty received an EU CRR banking licence from Luxembourg's financial regulator, the Commission de Surveillance du Secteur Financier (CSSF). The resulting entity, Riverty Bank, is headed by CEO Oliver Kuhaupt, formerly Riverty's chief risk officer, and began operations in August 2026. The licence enables Riverty to provide payment, credit, and liquidity services directly to merchants using its own balance sheet. At the time of the announcement, the company's payment and credit unit served more than 1,800 merchants and approximately 25 million customers, processing more than 235 million transactions annually across Europe.

== Activities ==
Riverty operates as a subsidiary of Bertelsmann and maintains its headquarters in Verl, Germany. The company works across multiple European markets, including Germany, Austria, Switzerland, the Netherlands, Ireland, Luxembourg, Poland, Norway, Sweden, Denmark, Finland, and Estonia.

Riverty provides payment, banking, consumer finance, accounting, factoring and debt collection services across multiple markets, serving merchants, consumers, and institutional clients including e-commerce retailers, public transport providers, telecommunications companies, EV charging operators, insurers, banks, and other financial services providers. Since 2026, Riverty has also provided banking, credit, and liquidity services to merchants through Riverty Bank, its licensed banking subsidiary in Luxembourg.

Riverty has integrated artificial intelligence into its operations, focusing on automating and enhancing customer service processes. The company collaborates with technology partners such as Microsoft, Adyen, and Parloa to develop AI-driven solutions, including voice assistants and intelligent service tools.

=== Memberships ===
The company is a member of the Federal Association of German Collection Agencies (BDIU) and the Federation of European National Collection Associations (FENCA).

Riverty maintains partnerships with major payment service providers such as Mollie, Adyen, Computop, and Stripe, and serves a wide range of merchants including Asos, Lego, Easypark, Tom Tailor, eBay, Decathlon, Mister Spex, Wehkamp, Flaconi, and SIXT.

== Controversies ==
In 2026, the Norwegian Consumer Council charged Riverty with illegal fee collection; the Oslo District Court ruled against Riverty, ordering them to pay back 300 million NOK in customer fees.
