= Openpay =

Australian fintech company

- Traded as: OPY.AX
- Industry: Finance
- Founded: 2013; 13 years ago
- Defunct: 7 February 2023
- Headquarters: Melbourne, Australia
- Area served: Australia
- Divisions: OpyPay
- Website: www.openpay.com.au

Openpay Group, commonly referred to by its trading name Openpay, was an Australian fintech company that operated in the "Buy now, pay later" field and provided online financial services and post purchase payments. Their core service was designed to allow customers to pay for items purchased using interest-free installments.

== History ==
Openpay was founded by Yaniv Meydan and Richard Broome in 2013. As opposed to similar 'Buy Now, Pay Later' companies such as Afterpay, Openpay has attempted to focus more on cash flow management on larger purchases in areas such as healthcare, automotive and home improvements. Since 2019, it also provides a software as a service (SaaS) product for B2B clients such as Woolworths to offer trade accounts and management.

Openpay previously expanded to both the United Kingdom and the United States, but departed both markets in 2022.

Openpay has gone into receivership on 7 February 2023.

In July 2023, it was announced that the OpyPro B2B SaaS platform had been sold to a related company – OP Fiduciary Pty Ltd – for $10 million. Openpay was officially removed from the ASX on 28 August 2023.

OpyPro Holding Pty Ltd. provides its cloud-based, B2B credit management solution based on the all-in-one trade accounts receivable platform. Major enterprise clients for its solution amongst others are Woolworths and HP.
