= Jack Dorsey =

American entrepreneur (born 1976)

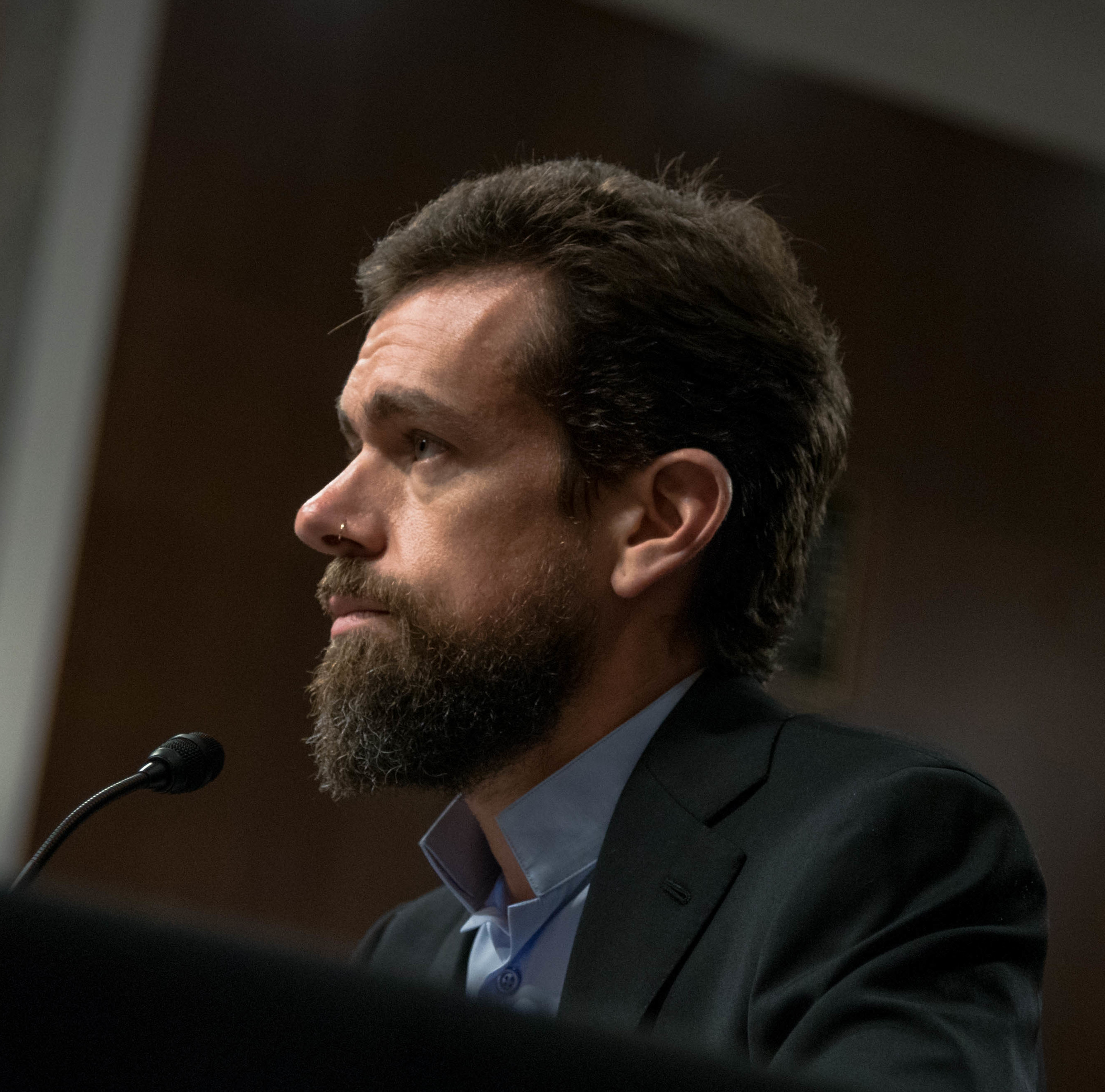
- Dorsey in 2018
- Born: Jack Patrick Dorsey; November 19, 1976 (age 50); St. Louis, Missouri, U.S.
- Education: Missouri University of Science and Technology (attended); New York University (dropped out)
- Occupation: Block Head, Block, Inc.
- Known for: Co-founding Twitter, Inc. and Block, Inc.
- Board member of: Block, Inc.; Berggruen Institute's Governance Center

Jack Patrick Dorsey (born November 19, 1976) is an American businessman who co-founded Twitter, Inc., which operated social media service Twitter, and financial technology company Block, Inc., which owns and operates Square, Cash App, Afterpay, Bitkey, and Tidal.

As of February 2026, Forbes estimated his net worth to be $5.9 billion.

== Early life ==
Dorsey was born and raised in St. Louis, Missouri. His father is Timothy G. Dorsey and his mother is Marcia A. Dorsey (née Smith). Jack Dorsey is partly of Italian descent on his mother's side. His father worked for a company that developed mass spectrometers and his mother was a homemaker. He was raised Catholic.

Dorsey attended Bishop DuBourg High School. In his younger days, he worked occasionally as a fashion model. By age 14, he had become interested in dispatch routing. Dorsey enrolled at the University of Missouri–Rolla in 1995 and attended for two-plus years before transferring to New York University in 1997, but he dropped out two years later, one semester short of graduating. He came up with the idea that eventually became Twitter while studying at New York University.

While working on dispatching as a programmer, Dorsey moved to California. In 2000, Dorsey started his company in Oakland to dispatch couriers, taxis, and emergency services from the Web. His other projects and ideas at this time included networks of medical devices and a "frictionless service market". In July 2000, building on dispatching and inspired in part by LiveJournal and by AOL Instant Messenger, he had the idea for a Web-based realtime status/short message communication service.

When he first saw implementations of instant messaging, Dorsey wondered whether the software's user status output could be shared easily among friends. He approached Odeo, which at the time happened to be interested in text messaging. Dorsey and Biz Stone decided that SMS text suited the status-message idea, and built a prototype of Twitter in about two weeks. The idea attracted many users at Odeo and investment from Evan Williams, a co-founder of that firm in 2005 who had left Google after selling Pyra Labs and Blogger.

== Career ==
=== Twitter ===
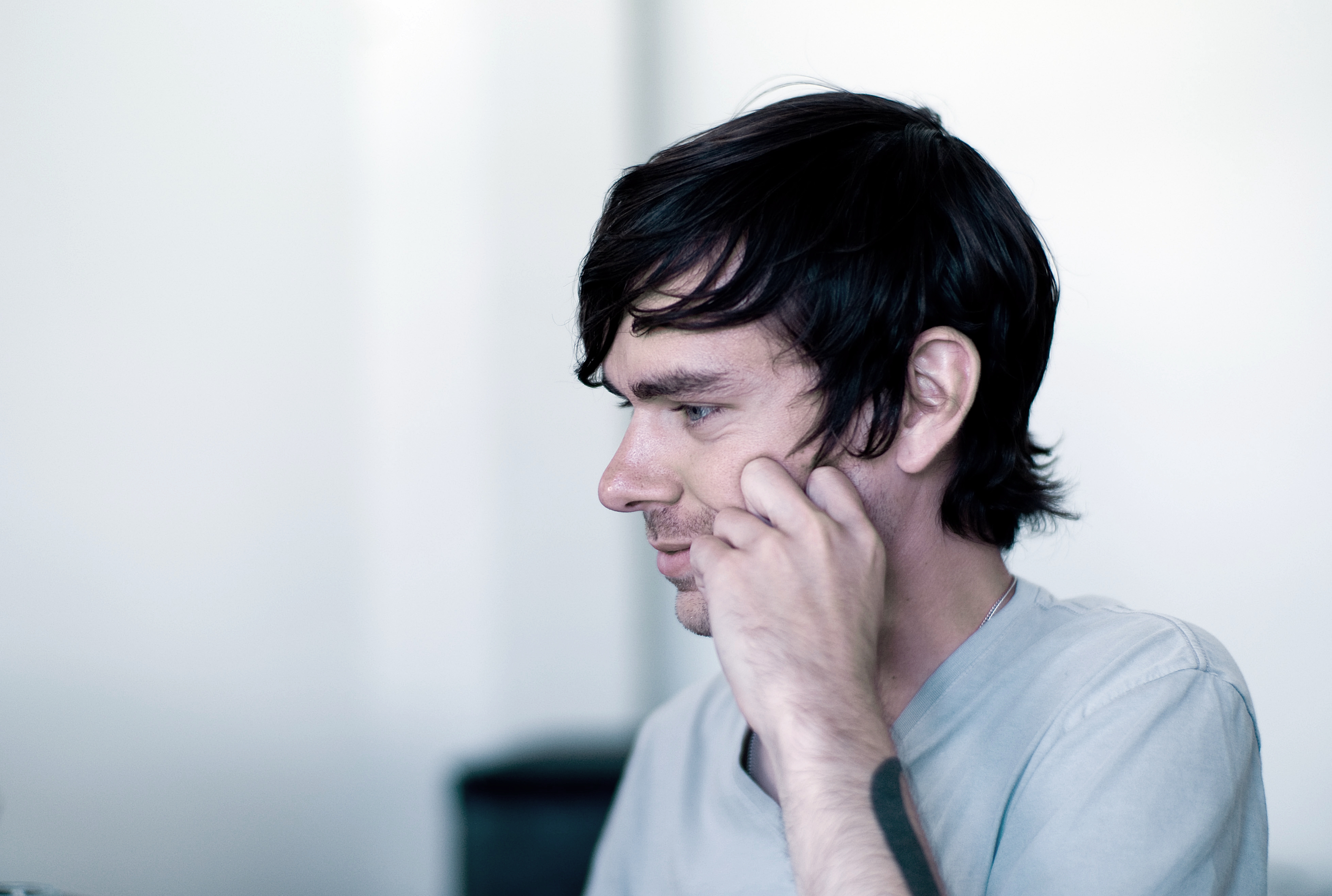
Dorsey in 2008

Noah Glass, Evan Williams, and Biz Stone co-founded Odeo, later renamed Obvious Corporation, which then spun off Twitter, Inc. Dorsey became Twitter's chief executive officer (CEO) when it was founded in 2007. As CEO, Dorsey saw the startup through two rounds of funding by venture capitalists. As the service began to grow in popularity, Dorsey chose the improvement of uptime as top priority, even over creating revenue—which, as of 2008, Twitter was not designed to earn. Dorsey described the commercial use of Twitter and its API as two things that could lead to paid features. His three guiding principles, which he says the company shares, are simplicity, constraint, and craftsmanship.

Dorsey lost his position as CEO in 2008, reportedly for leaving work early to enjoy other pursuits, such as yoga and fashion design. On October 16, 2008, Williams took over as CEO, while Dorsey became chairman of the board. During his time as chairman, Dorsey joined several State Department delegations, including a trip to Iraq in April 2009, led by Jared Cohen. In November, when Iranians took to the streets in the Green Revolution, Twitter was scheduled to conduct maintenance of its site, which would entail temporarily shutting down Twitter's servers. Dorsey responded to a request from Cohen to delay the maintenance so that it would not affect the protests in Iran, because Iranians were using Twitter to communicate and coordinate. Since President Obama had announced that there would be no meddling in Iran, the move sparked controversy. In February 2010, Dorsey was part of another State Department delegation, this time to Russia. In March 2011, he returned to Twitter as executive chairman after Dick Costolo replaced Williams as CEO. In July 2015, Costolo resigned as CEO, with Dorsey assuming the post of interim CEO. He was named permanent CEO in October 2015.

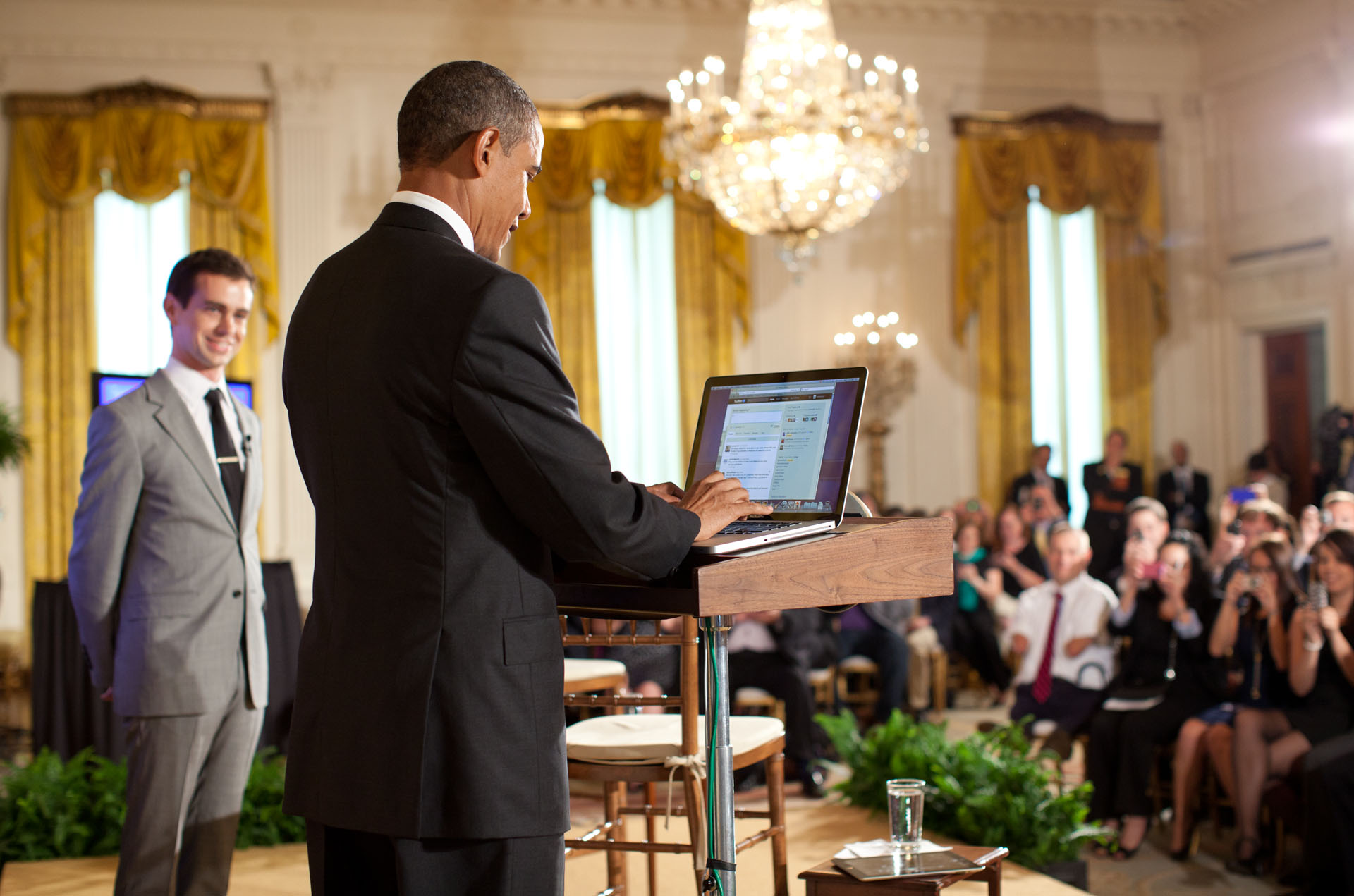
Dorsey and President Barack Obama at Twitter Town Hall in July 2011

In May 2016, Dorsey announced that Twitter would not count photos and links in the 140-character limit to free up more space for text. This was an attempt to entice new users, since the number of tweets per day had dropped from about 500 million in September 2013 and its peak of 661 million in August 2014 to about 300 million in January 2016.

On November 22, 2016, Dorsey was briefly suspended from his own Twitter account with 3.9 million followers. After restoring the account, Dorsey tweeted that the suspension was due to an "internal mistake".

Twitter introduced recommendation algorithms in the main feed in 2016. Dorsey wrote in 2022 that "The biggest mistake I made was continuing to invest in building tools for us to manage the public conversation, versus building tools for the people using Twitter to easily manage it for themselves."

In February 2017, Dorsey and Executive Chairman Omid Kordestani matched a $530,000 donation to the American Civil Liberties Union (ACLU) raised by Twitter staffers. Their match brought the total donation to $1.59 million.

In March 2018, Dorsey announced that an improved version of the verification system would be coming to Twitter. The purpose of redesigning verification was to let people verify more facts about themselves, emphasizing proof of identity. The overhaul was not in place before the U.S midterm election of 2018 to help in verifying the identities of the candidates.

In September 2018, Dorsey testified before the Senate Intelligence Committee alongside Facebook COO Sheryl Sandberg about the use of social media by Russia and others to meddle in the 2016 presidential election. Following this testimony, Twitter shares fell six percent.

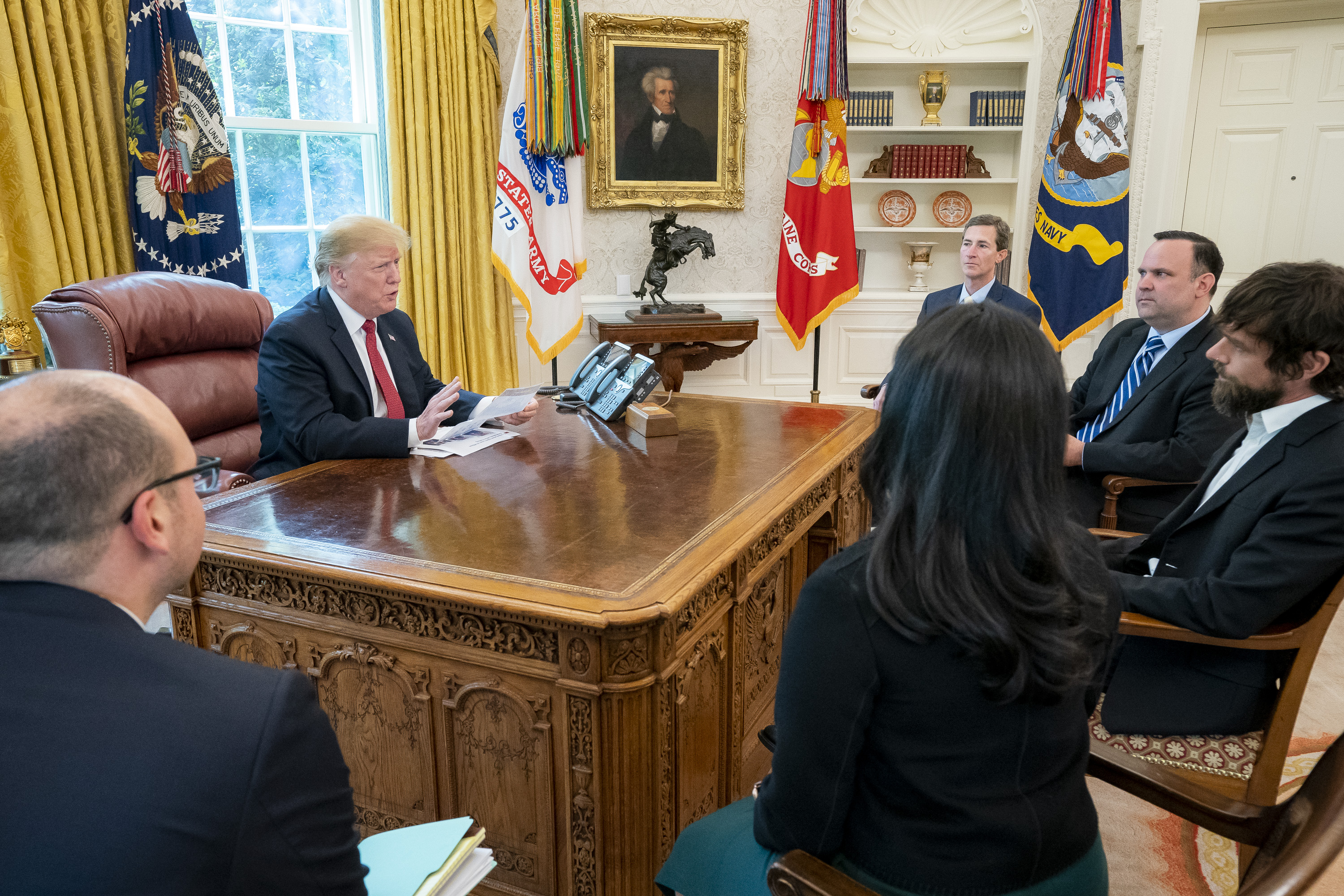
President Donald Trump with Dorsey in the Oval Office of the White House on April 23, 2019

Dorsey met privately with U.S. President Donald Trump at the White House and discussed Trump's concerns that Twitter had limited or removed some of his Twitter followers, and those of conservatives. After the meeting, Dorsey tweeted that their discussion included making Twitter "healthier and more civil". A week earlier, Dorsey took part in a TED talk about the social media platform's spread of abuse and misinformation, which has brought him criticism.

On August 30, 2019, Dorsey's personal Twitter account was allegedly breached for nearly an hour by a group calling itself the Chuckling Squad, posting and retweeting numerous racist tweets.

On October 23, 2019, Twitter's stock price fell by nearly 21 percent, to $30.75. The reason was an earnings miss off a third quarter report, which Twitter blamed on ad targeting problems. Dorsey had been making a concerted effort to dampen the effect that Twitter had on political elections, which entailed banning all political ads. This was also seen as a large contributor to the drop. Dorsey announced that, as of November 22, 2019, Twitter would ban all political advertising, which applied globally to all marketing campaigns about political issues. This policy was removed in August 2023 after ownership was transferred to Elon Musk.

On February 29, 2020, it was announced that activist hedge fund Elliott Management led by billionaire Paul Singer was looking to oust Dorsey and nominate four directors to Twitter's board, including Elliott's senior portfolio manager Jesse Cohn. The two parties reached an agreement days later, with Dorsey remaining CEO.

In October 2020, Dorsey was one of several tech firm CEOs subpoenaed by the US Senate Commerce Committee. Republican Roger Wicker, who chaired the committee, led the charge to force the CEOs of Twitter, Facebook and Google to testify about the legal immunity the tech platforms receive under Section 230 of the Communications Act of 1996.

He announced his immediate resignation as Twitter's CEO on November 29, 2021. Dorsey was replaced by the company's former CTO Parag Agrawal, who took over as CEO. Dorsey continued to lead as the CEO of Block, Inc. In May 2022, Dorsey left the board of directors of the social network.

In October 2022, Dorsey retained his 2.4% ownership of Twitter when the company was sold to Elon Musk.

=== Block ===
Dorsey, along with co-founder Jim McKelvey, developed a small business platform to accept debit and credit card payments on a mobile device called Square, released in May 2010. The small, square-shaped device attaches to Android, iPad, iPhone, or iPod Touch devices via the headphone jack, and as a mini card reader, allows a person to swipe their card, choose an amount to transfer to the recipient and then sign their name for confirmation. Square is also a system for sending paperless receipts via text message or email, and is available as a free app for Android and iOS. The company grew from 10 employees in December 2009 to over 100 by June 2011. Square's office is on Market Street in San Francisco. In September 2012, Business Insider magazine valued Square Inc. at US$3.2 billion. Dorsey is CEO of Square, Inc. On October 14, 2015, Square filed for an IPO to be listed on the New York Stock Exchange. As of that date, Dorsey owned 24.4 percent of the company. In March 2020 the FDIC permitted Square to open a bank. It announced plans to launch Square Financial Services in 2021.

In May 2020, Dorsey announced that employees of Square would permanently become remote workers.

In 2020, for months, Square began withholding up to 30 percent of the funds that merchants collected from customers using its Cash App.

On December 1, 2021, CEO Jack Dorsey officially changed the name of the platform to Block, Inc. This was due in part to his interest in the blockchain as well as the new name encompassing the various businesses better than the current name, which is mostly associated with its merchant-payment services. The stock ticker for Block, Inc. would remain "SQ".

=== Bluesky ===
In February 2022, Dorsey joined the board of directors of Bluesky, a Twitter spin-off developing a decentralized social networking protocol and app. In May 2024, he announced he was no longer on the board of directors. He instead endorsed X (formerly Twitter), which he called "freedom technology". In a 2024 interview, Dorsey said that Bluesky's shift toward a traditional corporate structure and the introduction of centralized moderation tools were major factors behind his decision to leave the company.

=== Digital currency ===
Dorsey is one of the few persons who are speculated to be Satoshi Nakamoto, the creator of Bitcoin.

=== Other projects ===
In 2013, Dorsey expressed his admiration of Michael Bloomberg to CNN, and said he aspires to become mayor of New York City. He served as a judge for Bloomberg's NYC BigApps competition in 2011. On December 24, 2013, Dorsey was announced as a new member of the board of directors of The Walt Disney Company. In January 2018, it was reported that Dorsey would not seek reelection at Disney's March annual meeting, due to increased difficulty with conflicts of interest.

Dorsey is a board member of the Berggruen Institute's Governance Center. Dorsey gives advice in a chapter of Tim Ferriss' book Tools of Titans. Dorsey is a vocal Bitcoin advocate, and has spoken at Bitcoin conferences such as "The B Word". He has said that if he were not working on Twitter and Square, he would be working on Bitcoin. He also endorses and financially supported the development of the Nostr social networking protocol.

In 2023, Dorsey provided the seed funding for OCEAN, a Bitcoin mining pool with the stated goal of decentralizing Bitcoin mining by giving miners the ability to select or construct their own block templates, reducing reliance on centralized pool operators. In 2025, Dorsey launched a peer-to-peer messaging app called Bitchat, which uses Bluetooth mesh networking to connect nearby users without the need for an internet connection. In November 2025, Dorsey announced he is backing a new app called diVine based on the defunct Vine platform.

== Personal life ==
In 2012, Dorsey moved to the Sea Cliff neighborhood of San Francisco.

=== Meditation ===
In 2015, Dorsey said he began his mornings with meditation. In late 2017, Dorsey completed ten days of meditation known as Vipassanā taught by followers of S. N. Goenka. In November 2018, Dorsey went on a birthday Vipassanā meditation trip to Myanmar.

=== Politics ===
In 2019, Dorsey contributed financially to the campaigns of 2020 Democratic presidential candidates Tulsi Gabbard and Andrew Yang. In 2020, he donated $15 million to 29 mayors pursuing the piloting of guaranteed basic income programs in the United States.

Until 2021, Dorsey applied "world leader" exceptions that enabled Donald Trump to post content on Twitter that would normally be removed or generate sanctions per the platform's rules. In May 2020, some of Trump's tweets received warning labels, and from Election Day 2020, more flaggings were applied to his tweets. On January 6, 2021, after Trump supporters stormed the U.S. Capitol, Twitter applied a 12-hour timeout to Trump's account for violating its Civic Integrity policy. Trump's account was suspended permanently on January 8 based on a review of his posts' content and context. On January 14, Dorsey defended banning Trump but also said it "sets a precedent I feel is dangerous".

In June 2023, Dorsey endorsed Robert F. Kennedy Jr. in his campaign to become the Democratic party nominee in the 2024 United States presidential election.

In 2024, Dorsey tweeted in support of Gaza war protests in the United States, Vietnam war protests, and Iraq war protests.

In October 2025, Dorsey endorsed Thomas Massie, a representative from Kentucky, for the 2028 Republican Party presidential nomination. In May 2026, Massie lost nomination to Ed Gallrein in his congressional district's Republican primary.

== Philanthropic and other donations ==
In March 2016, Dorsey fully funded about 600 Missouri public school projects registered at DonorsChoose.

In October 2019, Dorsey donated $350,000 to #TeamTrees, a nonprofit started by YouTubers MrBeast and Mark Rober, that pledged to plant 20 million trees by the end of 2019.

On April 7, 2020, Dorsey announced that he would move about $1 billion of his equity in Square, Inc., just under a third of his total wealth, to Start Small, LLC, and to relief programs related to the coronavirus. He committed to funding COVID-19 relief, girls' education and health, and universal basic income. Dorsey has donated $24 million to over 40 different grantees for relief efforts.

In August 2020, Dorsey donated $10 million to Boston University's Center for Antiracist Research, founded by Ibram X. Kendi.

In May 2021, Dorsey donated $15 million to support relief efforts in India's COVID-19 second wave. The three NGOs were Care ($10 million), Aid India ($2.5 million), and Sewa International ($2.5 million).

In January 2024, Dorsey gave $10 million to the Freedom of the Press Foundation, the largest donation in that organization's history. It followed a $1 million donation he had given in July 2023 in honor of whistleblower Daniel Ellsberg, who had just died.

In August 2026, he pledged to donate $ 1 million to the Omacom Foundation, which “will hold the trademarks, fund the infrastructure, promote the work, and support the open-source projects and developers” used by the controversial Omarchy Linux Project, founded by its also controversial figurehead David Heinemeier Hansson.

== Awards and recognition ==
- In 2008, he was named to the MIT Technology Review TR35 as one of the top 35 innovators in the world under the age of 35.
- In 2012, The Wall Street Journal gave him the "Innovator of the Year Award" for technology.
- At the 5th Annual Crunchies Awards in 2012, hosted by TechCrunch, Dorsey was named Founder of the Year.
- In 2013, he was considered by Forbes the world's most eligible billionaire bachelor.
- Dorsey was ranked by Fox Business as the No. 4 Worst CEO of 2016, citing stagnant growth, falling stock prices, and his part-time commitment to Twitter.
- In 2017, 24/7 Wall St. listed Dorsey among the 20 Worst CEOs in America.

Business positions
Preceded by Position established	Twitter CEO; 2006–2008	Succeeded by Evan Williams
Preceded by Dick Costolo	Twitter CEO; 2015–2021	Succeeded by Parag Agrawal
