= Scalapay =

European financial technology company

- Type: Private
- Industry: Financial technology, BNPL
- Founded: 2019
- Founders: Simone Mancini; Johnny Mitrevski; Raffaele Terrone; Daniele Tessari; Mirco Mattevi
- Headquarters: Dublin, Ireland
- Area served: Europe
- Key people: Simone Mancini (CEO), Johnny Mitrevski (CTO)
- Website: scalapay.com

Scalapay is a European financial technology company that provides buy now, pay later (BNPL) services. It was founded in 2019 by Simone Mancini, Johnny Mitrevski, Raffaele Terrone and Daniele Tessari. Scalapay is headquartered in Dublin, Ireland, and maintains major operating offices in Milan, Barcelona, Paris and Wollongong.

In February 2022, Scalapay raised $497 million in a Series B round led by Tencent, reaching a unicorn valuation. Its regulated subsidiary, Scalapay IP S.p.A., holds a payment institution license issued by the Bank of Italy.

== History ==
Simone Mancini, who was born in Tuscany and raised in Australia, and Johnny Mitrevski, a telecommunications engineering graduate of the University of Wollongong, identified an opportunity to offer buy now, pay later services in Southern Europe. They founded Scalapay in 2019 with Raffaele Terrone and Daniele Tessari. Both founders had previously worked in Australian technology companies, with Mancini at fintech firm Prospa and Mitrevski at Qantas and the Commonwealth Bank of Australia.

Scalapay expanded to France in April 2020. By August 2020, the company introduced an in-store product. In January 2021, Scalapay raised $48 million in a seed round led by Fasanara Capital, followed by a $155 million Series A investment led by Tiger Global Management in September 2021, valuing the company at $700 million.

In February 2022, Scalapay raised $497 million in a Series B round led by Tencent and Willoughby Capital, reaching unicorn status. It was named Prodotto dell’Anno, and awarded Illawarra Business of the Year.

The company released the “Pay in 4” and “Pay Later” options in March 2022 and raised an additional $27 million from Poste Italiane in May 2022, bringing total funding to over $727 million.

Raffaele Terrone, a co-founder of Scalapay, served as its chief financial officer and as a member of its board of directors until September 2022, when he stepped down from both positions. Fang Li subsequently became interim chief financial officer.

In March 2023, Scalapay acquired Italian payment institution Cabel IP, a company with nearly 40 years of operating history, renaming it Scalapay IP S.p.A. The acquisition, authorized by the Bank of Italy, gave Scalapay its own payment institution license under the EU's Payment Services Directive (PSD2).

In September 2023, Scalapay partnered with Visa and announced a collaboration with The National Chamber for Italian Fashion in January 2024 to promote sustainable shopping through “slow payment.”

In October 2023, Scalapay signed a five-year exclusive contract with Marqeta for virtual card issuance across Europe. In May 2024, Scalapay announced partnerships with Deutsche Bank to extend installment options up to 36 installments for amounts up to €15,000, both online and in-store, and with Dutch payment company Adyen for payment processing integration.

In February 2025, Scalapay expanded its partnership with Stripe to integrate its Buy Now, Pay Later service directly into Stripe's platform. In December 2025, the European Investment Bank (EIB) signed a €70 million financing agreement with Scalapay under the TechEU programme.

== Operations ==
Scalapay offers consumers several installment options at the point of sale, including three or four interest-free installments and deferred full payment within 14 days. Through its Deutsche Bank partnership, the company also offers 6 to 36 monthly installments on purchases up to €15,000.

Unlike some competitors, Scalapay does not perform traditional credit checks; instead, first-time users are limited to smaller purchases, with spending limits increasing based on repayment history. Scalapay is headquartered in Dublin, Ireland, and has operating offices in Milan, Barcelona, Paris, and Wollongong.

As of December 2025, the service had over 11 million users and more than 10,000 partner brands.

== Reception ==
Scalapay’s BNPL was named Prodotto dell’Anno (Product of the Year) in Italy in 2022 and was listed among LinkedIn’s Top Startups in Italy in 2023. The EU's revised Consumer Credit Directive (CCD2), adopted in 2023, brought short-term BNPL products within the scope of consumer credit regulation, requiring affordability assessments that would affect Scalapay's no-credit-check model.
