= Bitkey =

Bitcoin cryptocurrency hardware wallet product

- Developer: Block, Inc.
- Type: Cryptocurrency wallet
- Launched: December 7, 2023
- Current version: Model BK001
- Operating systems: Android, iOS
- Status: Active
- Pricing model: US$250 upfront (hardware)
- Availability: 95+ countries: U.S.; Argentina; Canada; Mexico; Nigeria; India and others
- Website: https://bitkey.world

Bitkey is a digital wallet for bitcoin, available in the U.S. and 95 other countries. Launched in 2023 by Block, Inc., a company founded by Jack Dorsey, Bitkey began shipping in March 2024. It is a multisignature wallet, storing bitcoin independently of third-party cryptocurrency exchanges or custodial platforms.

Bitkey includes a mobile app, a hardware device, and a set of recovery tools in case the customer loses the phone, their hardware or both.

== History ==
Jack Dorsey announced in June 2021 that Block was in the process of creating a cryptocurrency wallet. By April 2022, the company had released images of the wallet's hardware component, referred to as "Rocky" by Dorsey. This component was described to include a fingerprint reader and a USB-C charging port.

Business Today stated in July 2023 that Block was imparting Bitkey a "minimalistic" and "sleek" design with no screen interface on the hardware device itself. The only interactive element on the device would be a fingerprint sensor. For executing a transaction, the user would have to initiate a command on the Bitkey mobile app and then confirm the transaction by touching the fingerprint sensor on the device and tapping the device to the mobile phone via near field communication (NFC).

Block officially launched Bitkey on December 7, 2023 in more than 95 countries including the U.S., Argentina, Canada, Mexico, Nigeria and India, making it available for pre-orders for US$150. At the time of launch, the company presented Bitkey as a "self-custody" wallet, enabling users to store bitcoin independently from "custodial platforms" or cryptocurrency exchanges, thereby reducing reliance on third-party custodians. Furthermore, Block stated that, in contrast to other self-custody options, the wallet would not require users to memorize lengthy passwords or seed phrases for securing their bitcoin. Bitkey included a mobile app, a hardware device, and a set of recovery tools in case the customer loses the phone, their hardware or both. According to Block, Bitkey was a two-of-three multisignature wallet, meaning there were three keys in the system, but any two of them needed to work together to approve transactions and recovery actions. The customer always held two keys — the one in the mobile app and the one in the hardware device — while Block held one, so the company could never move money without a customer’s involvement. Bitkey also offered integrations with custodial platforms such as Cash App and Coinbase to facilitate transferring bitcoin from those platforms to Bitkey.

In March 2024, Block started shipping the Bitkey hardware device. In October 2024, Time named the wallet as one of the "best inventions of 2024". In November 2024, Block announced it was launching an "inheritance feature" to enhance control and privacy for Bitkey users. The feature was set to become widely available in January 2025.
