= List of acts of the Parliament of Victoria from 2010 =

This is a list of acts of the Parliament of Victoria, Australia for the year 2010.

== 2010 ==
Short title, or popular name	Citation	Royal assent
Long title
Consumer Affairs Legislation Amendment Act 2010	No. 1 of 2010	9 February 2010
An Act to amend the Conveyancers Act 2006, (Note: Conveyancers Act 2006 (No. 75 of 2006)) the Estate Agents Act 1980, (Note: Estate Agents Act 1980 (No. 9428)) the Fair Trading Act 1999, (Note: Fair Trading Act 1999 (No. 16 of 1999)) the Owners Corporations Act 2006, (Note: Owners Corporations Act 2006 (No. 69 of 2006)) the Prostitution Control Act 1994, (Note: Prostitution Control Act 1994 (No. 102 of 1994)) the Sale of Land Act 1962 (Note: Sale of Land Act 1962 (No. 6975)) and the Trade Measurement (Administration) Act 1995, (Note: Trade Measurement (Administration) Act 1995 (No. 60 of 1995)) to repeal the Collusive Practices Act 1965, (Note: Collusive Practices Act 1965 (No. 7353)) the Fuel Prices Regulation Act 1981, (Note: Fuel Prices Regulation Act 1981 (No. 9702)) the Marketable Securities Act 1970, (Note: Marketable Securities Act 1970 (No. 7970)) the Petroleum Retail Selling Sites Act 1981, (Note: Petroleum Retail Selling Sites Act 1981 (No. 9704)) the Petroleum Products (Terminal Gate Pricing) Act 2000, (Note: Petroleum Products (Terminal Gate Pricing) Act 2000 (No. 71 of 2000)) the Private Agents Act 1966, (Note: Private Agents Act 1966 (No. 7494)) the Trade Measurement Act 1995, (Note: Trade Measurement Act 1995 (No. 59 of 1995)) the Trade Measurement (Administration) Act 1995 and the Utility Meters (Metrological Controls) Act 2002, (Note: Utility Meters (Metrological Controls) Act 2002 (No. 48 of 2002)) to repeal provisions of the Landlord and Tenant Act 1958 (Note: Landlord and Tenant Act 1958 (No. 6285)) and re-enact a provision in the Property Law Act 1958, (Note: Property Law Act 1958 (No. 6344)) to repeal certain provisions of, and make consequential amendments to, various other Acts and for other purposes.
Legislation Reform (Repeals No. 5) Act 2010	No. 2 of 2010	9 February 2010
An Act to repeal certain redundant Acts relating to companies and related matters and to make a consequential amendment to the Corporations (Ancillary Provisions) Act 2001. (Note: Corporations (Ancillary Provisions) Act 2001 (No. 43 of 2001))
Royal Melbourne Institute of Technology Act 2010	No. 3 of 2010	16 February 2010
An Act to re-enact with amendments the law relating to the University named Royal Melbourne Institute of Technology, to repeal the Royal Melbourne Institute of Technology Act 1992 (Note: Royal Melbourne Institute of Technology Act 1992 (No. 45 of 1992)) and for other purposes.
Swinburne University of Technology Act 2010	No. 4 of 2010	16 February 2010
An Act to re-enact with amendments the law relating to Swinburne University of Technology, to repeal the Swinburne University of Technology Act 1992 (Note: Swinburne University of Technology Act 1992 (No. 44 of 1992)) and to make consequential amendments to other Acts and for other purposes.
University of Ballarat Act 2010 or the Federation University Australia Act 2010	No. 5 of 2010	16 February 2010
An Act to re-enact with amendments the law relating to the University of Ballarat, to repeal the University of Ballarat Act 1993 (Note: University of Ballarat Act 1993 (No. 107 of 1993)) and for other purposes.
Transport Integration Act 2010	No. 6 of 2010	2 March 2010
An Act to create a new framework for the provision of an integrated and sustainable transport system in Victoria, to amend the Transport Act 1983, (Note: Transport Act 1983 (No. 9921)) the Marine Act 1988, (Note: Marine Act 1988 (No. 52 of 1988)) the Rail Corporations Act 1996, (Note: Rail Corporations Act 1996 (No. 79 of 1996)) the Eastlink Project Act 2004 (Note: Mitcham-Frankston Project Act 2004 (No. 39 of 2004)) and certain other Acts, to repeal the Southern and Eastern Integrated Transport Authority Act 2003 (Note: Southern and Eastern Integrated Transport Authority Act 2003 (No. 25 of 2003)) and for other purposes.
Crimes Legislation Amendment Act 2010	No. 7 of 2010	
Liquor Control Reform Amendment (ANZAC Day) Act 2010	No. 8 of 2010	
Accident Compensation Amendment Act 2010	No. 9 of 2010	
Offshore Petroleum and Greenhouse Gas Storage Act 2010	No. 10 of 2010	23 March 2010
An Act to regulate petroleum exploration and recovery activities and petroleum facilities and the geological storage of carbon dioxide in the Victorian offshore area and for other purposes.
Credit (Commonwealth Powers) Act 2010	No. 11 of 2010	30 March 2010
An Act to adopt the National Consumer Credit Protection Act 2009 (Note: National Consumer Credit Protection Act 2009 (No. 134 (Cth))) of the Commonwealth (as amended) and the National Consumer Credit Protection (Transitional and Consequential Provisions) Act 2009 (Note: National Consumer Credit Protection (Transitional and Consequential Provisions) Act 2009 (No. 135 (Cth))) of the Commonwealth, and to refer certain matters relating to the provision of credit and certain other financial transactions to the Parliament of the Commonwealth, for the purposes of section 51(xxxvii) of the Constitution of the Commonwealth and to make related provisions and transitional and consequential provisions.
Magistrates' Court Amendment (Assessment and Referral Court List) Act 2010	No. 12 of 2010	30 March 2010
Statute Law Amendment (National Health Practitioner Regulation) Act 2010	No. 13 of 2010	30 March 2010
Victoria University Act 2010	No. 14 of 2010	30 March 2010
An Act to re-enact with amendments the law relating to Victoria University, to repeal the Victoria University of Technology Act 1990 (Note: Victoria University of Technology Act 1990 (No. 21 of 1990)) and for other purposes.
Livestock Management Act 2010	No. 15 of 2010	20 April 2010
An Act to regulate livestock management in Victoria and for other purposes.
Equal Opportunity Act 2010	No. 16 of 2010	27 April 2010
An Act to re-enact and extend the law relating to equal opportunity and protection against discrimination, sexual harassment and victimisation, to repeal the Equal Opportunity Act 1995, (Note: Equal Opportunity Act 1995 (No. 42 of 1995)) to make consequential amendments to other Acts and for other purposes.
Trustee Companies Legislation Amendment Act 2010	No. 17 of 2010	
Justice Legislation Amendment (Victims of Crime Assistance and Other Matters) Act 2010	No. 18 of 2010	
Transport Legislation Amendment (Compliance, Enforcement and Regulation) Act 2010	No. 19 of 2010	18 May 2010
An Act to amend the Transport Act 1983, the Bus Safety Act 2009, (Note: Bus Safety Act 2009 (No. 13 of 2009)) the Rail Safety Act 2006, (Note: Rail Safety Act 2006 (No. 9 of 2006)) the Marine Act 1988, the Rail Corporations Act 1996, the Road Safety Act 1986, (Note: Road Safety Act 1986 (No. 127 of 1986)) the Working with Children Act 2005, (Note: Working with Children Act 2005 (No. 57 of 2005)) the Public Transport Competition Act 1995, (Note: Public Transport Competition Act 1995 (No. 68 of 1995)) the Road Management Act 2004, (Note: Road Management Act 2004 (No. 12 of 2004)) the Transport Legislation Amendment Act 2007 (Note: Transport Legislation Amendment Act 2007 (No. 69 of 2007)) and other Acts and for other purposes.
Environment Protection Amendment (Landfill Levies) Act 2010	No. 20 of 2010	
Fair Trading Amendment (Unfair Contract Terms) Act 2010	No. 21 of 2010	
Legislation Reform (Repeals No. 6) Act 2010	No. 22 of 2010	1 June 2010
An Act to repeal certain spent Acts.
Planning and Environment Amendment (Growth Areas Infrastructure Contribution) Act 2010	No. 23 of 2010	1 June 2010
Radiation Amendment Act 2010	No. 24 of 2010	1 June 2010
Therapeutic Goods (Victoria) Act 2010	No. 25 of 2010	1 June 2010
An Act to repeal the Therapeutic Goods (Victoria) Act 1994, (Note: Therapeutic Goods (Victoria) Act 1994 (No. 79 of 1994)) to provide for the application of the Therapeutic Goods Act 1989 (Note: Therapeutic Goods Act 1989 (No. 21 (Cth))) of the Commonwealth as a law of Victoria, to provide for continued controls over therapeutic goods not covered by the Commonwealth Act and for other purposes.
Child Employment Amendment Act 2010	No. 26 of 2010	
Education and Training Reform Amendment Act 2010	No. 27 of 2010	
Education and Training Reform Further Amendment Act 2010	No. 28 of 2010	
Health and Human Services Legislation Amendment Act 2010	No. 29 of 2010	
Justice Legislation Amendment Act 2010	No. 30 of 2010	
Prahran Mechanics' Institute Amendment Act 2010	No. 31 of 2010	8 June 2010
An Act to amend the Prahran Mechanics' Institute Act 1899. (Note: Prahran Mechanics' Institute Act 1899 (63 Vict. No. 1617))
Water Amendment (Entitlements) Act 2010	No. 32 of 2010	
Building Amendment Act 2010	No. 33 of 2010	
Courts Legislation Miscellaneous Amendments Act 2010	No. 34 of 2010	
Parks and Crown Land Legislation (Mount Buffalo) Act 2010	No. 35 of 2010	15 June 2010
An Act to amend the Crown Land (Reserves) Act 1978 (Note: Crown Land (Reserves) Act 1978 (No. 9212)) and the National Parks Act 1975, (Note: National Parks Act 1975 (No. 8702)) to revoke certain permanent reservations, to make minor amendments to other Acts and for other purposes.
State Taxation Acts Amendment Act 2010	No. 36 of 2010	
Appropriation (2010/2011) Act 2010 (repealed)	No. 37 of 2010	30 June 2010
An Act for the appropriation of certain sums out of the Consolidated Fund for the ordinary annual services of the Government for the financial year 2010/2011 and for other purposes. (Repealed by Statute Law Repeals Act 2017 (No. 17 of 2017))
Appropriation (Parliament 2010/2011) Act 2010 (repealed)	No. 38 of 2010	30 June 2010
An Act for the appropriation of certain sums out of the Consolidated Fund for the Parliament in respect of the financial year 2010/2011 and for other purposes. (Repealed by Statute Law Repeals Act 2017 (No. 17 of 2017))
Pharmacy Regulation Act 2010	No. 39 of 2010	30 June 2010
An Act to regulate the ownership and operation of pharmacy businesses, pharmacy departments and pharmacy depots, to establish the Victorian Pharmacy Authority, and to make consequential amendments to other Acts and for other purposes.
Superannuation Legislation Amendment Act 2010	No. 40 of 2010	
Electoral Amendment (Electoral Participation) Act 2010	No. 41 of 2010	
Control of Weapons Amendment Act 2010	No. 42 of 2010	
Severe Substance Dependence Treatment Act 2010	No. 43 of 2010	
Domestic Animals Amendment (Dangerous Dogs) Act 2010	No. 44 of 2010	
Transport Legislation Amendment (Ports Integration) Act 2010	No. 45 of 2010	
Associations Incorporation Amendment Act 2010	No. 46 of 2010	
Civil Procedure Act 2010	No. 47 of 2010	24 August 2010
An Act to provide for the reform and modernisation of the laws, practice, procedure and processes for the resolution of civil disputes which may lead to civil proceedings and for the initiation and conduct of civil proceedings and appeals, to amend the Supreme Court Act 1986, (Note: Supreme Court Act 1986 (No. 110 of 1986)) the County Court Act 1958 (Note: County Court Act 1958 (No. 6230)) and the Magistrates' Court Act 1989 (Note: Magistrates' Court Act 1989 (No. 51 of 1989)) and other Acts and for other purposes.
Primary Industries Legislation Amendment Act 2010	No. 48 of 2010	24 August 2010
Supported Residential Services (Private Proprietors) Act 2010 or the Supported Residential Services (Community Visitors) Act 2010	No. 49 of 2010	24 August 2010
An Act to regulate private supported residential services, to make consequential amendments to the Health Services Act 1988 (Note: Health Services Act 1988 (No. 49 of 1988)) and several other Acts and for other purposes.
Water Amendment (Victorian Environmental Water Holder) Act 2010	No. 50 of 2010	
Working with Children Amendment Act 2010	No. 51 of 2010	
Firearms and Other Acts Amendment Act 2010	No. 52 of 2010	
Personal Safety Intervention Orders Act 2010	No. 53 of 2010	7 September 2010
An Act to make provision for a system of personal safety intervention orders, the use of mediation and other matters relating to the prevention and resolution of prohibited behaviour and stalking, to repeal the Stalking Intervention Orders Act 2008 (Note: Stalking Intervention Orders Act 2008 (No. 68 of 2008)) and for other purposes.
Climate Change Act 2010	No. 54 of 2010	14 September 2010
An Act to provide a framework for action on climate change in Victoria, to set a target to reduce greenhouse gas emissions, to provide for forestry rights, carbon sequestration rights and soil carbon rights on land, to repeal the Forestry Rights Act 1996, (Note: Forestry Rights Act 1996 (No. 29 of 1996)) to amend the Conservation, Forests and Lands Act 1987, (Note: Conservation, Forests and Lands Act 1987 (No. 41 of 1987)) the Environment Protection Act 1970, (Note: Environment Protection Act 1970 (No. 8056)) the Transport Integration Act 2010 (Note: Transport Integration Act 2010 (No. 6 of 2010)) and other Acts and for other purposes.
Energy and Resources Legislation Amendment Act 2010	No. 55 of 2010	
Gambling Regulation Amendment (Licensing) Act 2010	No. 56 of 2010	
Liquor Control Reform Amendment Act 2010	No. 57 of 2010	
Local Government and Planning Legislation Amendment Act 2010	No. 58 of 2010	
Mineral Resources Amendment (Sustainable Development) Act 2010	No. 59 of 2010	
Plant Biosecurity Act 2010	No. 60 of 2010	14 September 2010
An Act to re-enact with amendments the laws relating to plant pest and disease control and plant product description, to repeal the Plant Health and Plant Products Act 1995 (Note: Plant Health and Plant Products Act 1995 (No. 51 of 1995)) and for other purposes.
Private Security Amendment Act 2010	No. 61 of 2010	
Traditional Owner Settlement Act 2010	No. 62 of 2010	21 September 2010
An Act to recognise traditional owner groups based on their traditional and cultural associations to certain land in Victoria, to provide for the making of agreements between the State and traditional owner groups, to recognise and confer rights on traditional owner groups as to access to or ownership or management of certain public land and as to decision making rights and other rights that may be exercised in relation to the use and development of the land or natural resources on the land, to make any amendments that are necessary to other Acts to ensure the agreements are effective, to make any related and consequential amendments to other Acts and for other purposes.
Consumer Affairs Legislation Amendment (Reform) Act 2010	No. 63 of 2010	
Justice Legislation Further Amendment Act 2010	No. 64 of 2010	
Marine Safety Act 2010	No. 65 of 2010	28 September 2010
An Act to provide for safe marine operations in Victoria and to consequentially amend the Marine Act 1988 (Note: Marine Act 1988 (No. 52 of 1988)) and other Acts and for other purposes.
Occupational Licensing National Law Act 2010	No. 66 of 2010	28 September 2010
An Act to provide for a national law to regulate the licensing of certain occupations and for other purposes.
Residential Tenancies Amendment Act 2010	No. 67 of 2010	
Confiscation Amendment Act 2010	No. 68 of 2010	
Education and Care Services National Law Act 2010	No. 69 of 2010	12 October 2010
An Act to provide for a National Law to regulate education and care services for children and for other purposes.
Bail Amendment Act 2010	No. 70 of 2010	
Education and Training Reform Amendment (Skills) Act 2010	No. 71 of 2010	
Fair Trading Amendment (Australian Consumer Law) Act 2010	No. 72 of 2010	
Fire Services Commissioner Act 2010	No. 73 of 2010	
Personal Property Securities (Statute Law Revision and Implementation) Act 2010	No. 74 of 2010	
Road Legislation Miscellaneous Amendments Act 2010	No. 75 of 2010	
Road Safety Amendment (Hoon Driving) Act 2010	No. 76 of 2010	
Sentencing Amendment Act 2010	No. 77 of 2010	
Subordinate Legislation Amendment Act 2010	No. 78 of 2010	
Tourist and Heritage Railways Act 2010	No. 79 of 2010	19 October 2010
An Act to enact a legislative scheme relating to tourist and heritage railway operators and for other purposes.
Transport Accident and Accident Compensation Legislation Amendment Act 2010	No. 80 of 2010	19 October 2010
An Act to amend the Transport Accident Act 1986 (Note: Transport Accident Act 1986 (No. 111 of 1986)) and to make further amendments to the Accident Compensation Act 1985 (Note: Accident Compensation Act 1985 (No. 10191)) and the Accident Compensation (WorkCover Insurance) Act 1993, (Note: Accident Compensation (WorkCover Insurance) Act 1993 (No. 50 of 1993)) to make consequential amendments to certain other Acts and for other purposes.

== Sources ==
- "Acts as made: 2010". Victoria Legislation.
