= Nick Molnar =

Australian entrepreneur

- Born: Nicholas Molnar; February 1990 (age 36)
- Education: Moriah College
- Alma mater: University of Sydney
- Occupation: FinTech entrepreneur
- Known for: Co-founder of Afterpay
- Spouse: Gabrielle Molnar (m. 2015)
- Children: 2

Nick Molnar (born February 1990) is an Australian entrepreneur who is the co-founder of Afterpay.

== Early life and education ==
While attending Sydney's Moriah College, as a student, Molnar began selling jewellery on eBay, ultimately becoming the top Australia jewellery seller on the site. Molnar persuaded Ice.com, a U.S. online jeweler to let him launch iceonline.com.au. He eventually grew the business to A$2 million in annual revenue.

He graduated with a Bachelor of Commerce from the University of Sydney.

== Afterpay ==
In 2014, Molnar began working with Anthony Eisen to develop Afterpay, a consumer lending company that would allow consumers to purchase items up to $1000 and pay in four interest-free instalments. Late charges would accrue beginning after a payment is missed, with interest and fees capped at 25% of an item's price. Retailers are charged 4-6% for every transaction.

In August 2021 Afterpay and Square, Inc. (later renamed Block, Inc. in December 2021), a digital payments company, announced they had entered into arrangements for Square to acquire Afterpay for US$29 billion (A$39 billion) which was completed on 31 January 2022. Molnar and Eisen received US$2.7 billion in Square stock for their Afterpay shares and, post-settlement, they jointly led Afterpay’s merchant and consumer businesses inside Square. Eisen subsequently exited the business; while Molnar became Block's global head of sales.

== Personal life ==
In November 2015, Molnar married Gabrielle and they have two children. In 2020 Nick and Gabrielle Molnar purchased a North Bondi property for approximately A$27 million; and subsequently acquired an adjoining property the following year for A$18.5 million. In November 2022 it was reported that Molnar was intending to sell an 864-square-metre (9,300 sq ft) Los Angeles apartment for A$43 million; that was subsequently sold to Rihanna for A$31 million. Molnar also owns a 6.3-hectare (16-acre) rural property with three dwellings, located in Bowral. Molnar is Jewish.

=== Net worth ===
In July 2022, Business Insider Magazine stated that Molnar was the youngest Australian "self-made" billionaire. In 2021, Molnar was selected as a Bloomberg New Economy Catalyst. As of May 2025, The Australian Financial Review assessed Molnar's net worth at A$1.11 billion on the 2025 Rich List.

Year	Financial Review Rich List		Forbes Australia's 50 Richest	
Year	Rank	Net worth (A$)	Rank	Net worth (US$)
2020	50 ▼	$1.86 billion ▼		
2021	38 ▲	$2.67 billion ▲		
2022	90 ▼	$1.50 billion ▼		
2023	111 ▼	$1.26 billion ▼		
2024		$1.40 billion ▲		
2025	151 ▼	$1.11 billion ▼		

Legend
Icon	Description
Steady	Has not changed from the previous year
▲	Has increased from the previous year
▼	Has decreased from the previous year
