= Anthony Eisen =

Australian businessperson

- Born: 1972 (age 53–54)
- Education: Sydney Grammar School; UNSW Sydney
- Occupation: FinTech entrepreneur
- Known for: Co-founder of Afterpay
- Spouse: Samantha Eisen

Anthony Eisen is an Australian FinTech entrepreneur and is the co-founder and chief executive officer of Afterpay. Eisen and co-founder, Nick Molnar, a neighbour in the Sydney suburb of Rose Bay, started the company in 2014. As of February 2025, Eisen currently sits on Block, Inc's board of directors.

== Background and career ==
Eisen attended Sydney Grammar School and graduated from the University of New South Wales with a Bachelor of Commerce. He initially began working as a chartered accountant before moving into investment banking, specialising in mergers and acquisitions.

In August 2021, Afterpay was acquired by Square Inc. (later renamed Block, Inc. in December 2021) for US$29 billion. It was reported that Eisen and Molnar received US$2.7 billion in Square stock for their Afterpay shares and, post-settlement, they will jointly lead Afterpay’s merchant and consumer businesses inside Square. Eisen joined Block, Inc's board of directors in February 2025.

== Personal life ==
Eisen is married to Samantha, an interior designer. It was reported that the couple own properties in Toorak and Byron Bay. The Eisen family's interests in philanthropy are pursued via the Eisen Family Private Fund.

His net worth was assessed as US$1.8 billion. As of May 2025, The Australian Financial Review assessed Eisen's net worth at A$1.13 billion on the 2025 Rich List.

Year	Financial Review Rich List		Forbes Australia's 50 Richest	
Year	Rank	Net worth (A$)	Rank	Net worth (US$)
2020	51 ▲	$1.86 billion ▲		
2021	38 ▲	$2.66 billion ▲		
2022	91 ▼	$1.50 billion ▼		
2023	112 ▼	$1.26 billion ▼		
2024		$1.40 billion ▲		
2025	147	$1.13 billion ▼		

Legend
Icon	Description
Steady	Has not changed from the previous year
▲	Has increased from the previous year
▼	Has decreased from the previous year
