= Jim McKelvey =

American billionaire businessman

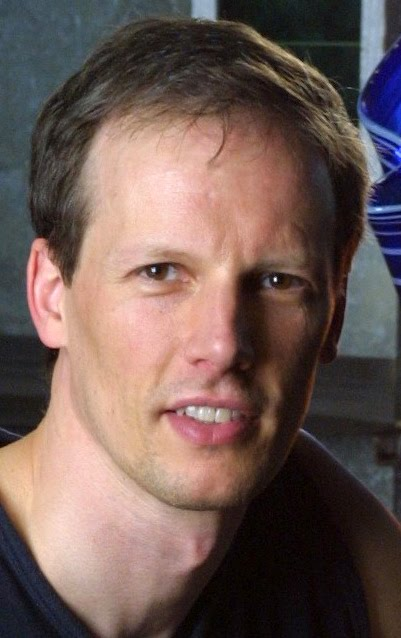
- Born: James Morgan McKelvey Jr. October 19, 1965 (age 61); St. Louis, Missouri, US
- Education: Washington University in St. Louis
- Occupation: Businessman Entrepreneur
- Years active: 1989–present
- Known for: Director of Block, Inc. (Formerly Square)
- Board member of: Emerson Electric, and Block, Inc.

James "Jim" Morgan McKelvey Jr. (born 1965 or 1966) is a New York City-based American billionaire, and businessman, who co-founded Block, Inc.(formerly Square). He is a Board Director at Emerson Electric.

McKelvey was appointed as an independent director of the Federal Reserve Bank of St. Louis in January 2017. As of September 2026, his net worth was estimated at US$1.8 billion.

== Early life and education ==
James Morgan McKelvey Jr. was born and raised in St. Louis, Missouri. He attended Ladue Horton Watkins High School.

He later graduated in 1987 from Washington University in St. Louis with a Bachelor's degree in Economics and Computer Science.

== Career ==
=== Early career ===
McKelvey wrote and published a handbook on UCSD Pascal and Apple Pascal in 1986. Following his Washington University graduation, McKelvey worked as a contractor for IBM in Los Angeles and in St. Louis. At the same time, he worked as a glassblowing instructor and founded Disconcepts, a CD-cabinet manufacturer.

=== MIRA Conference Inc. ===
In 1989, McKelvey and a team of software engineers from Washington University, established MIRA Pharmaceuticals, Inc. in St. Louis. Their inaugural product, a commercial document imaging system, was partly developed by their summer intern Jack Dorsey, who would later rise to prominence as the co-founder of Twitter.

=== Third Degree Glass Factory ===
In 2000, after giving a glassblowing demonstration at WUSTL, McKelvey met Doug Auer. In 2002, they founded Third Degree Glass Factory in St. Louis, a glass art studio and gallery which also provides space for private events.

=== Block, Inc. (formerly known as Square, Inc.) ===
In 2009, McKelvey co-founded Block, Inc. with Jack Dorsey. McKelvey had the inspiration of starting Block, Inc. when he was trying to sell something made at his glass studio to a customer, and he lost the sale, as he was unable to accept credit card as a form of payment.

Professor Robert Morley made valuable early contributions to the hardware used by Square in 2009. In 2011, the iconic card reader design was inducted into the Museum of Modern Art. McKelvey served as Square's chairman until 2010.

In July 2023, McKelvey was named to the Board of Directors at Block, Inc.

=== Invisibly ===
In June 2016, McKelvey founded Invisibly, a company seeking to allow consumers to profit from their online data. The company advertises itself as a media agency that is, "built for brands and agencies who want senior level strategy and buying without the operational cost and headaches of building or maintaining an in house team."

=== The Federal Reserve and FINTOP ===
In 2017, McKelvey was appointed as an Independent Director of the Federal Reserve Bank of St. Louis. In January 2022, McKelvey was named as chair.

In 2017, McKelvey also co-founded Financial Technology Operative Partners Venture (FINTOP) Capital, a Venture capital firm, specialising in B2B fintech companies. He remains as a General Partner of the company.

=== Downtown North ===
Since 2019, McKelvey and real estate partner, John Berglund, worked through the StarWood Group, on the development of Downtown North, a neighborhood in St. Louis.

=== Emerson Electric ===
In May 2023, MeKelvey became a Board Director of Emerson Electric, a multinational automation and electrical equipment company.

=== FastTrials ===
McKelvey founded FastTrials in 2025, a company that recruits eligible clinical trial patients through AI.

== Non-profit work ==
=== LaunchCode ===
In September 2013, McKelvey co-founded LaunchCode, a non-profit organization that aims to grow new talent and create pathways to on-the-job training and employment. LaunchCode partners with companies to set up paid apprenticeships in technology for talented people who lack the traditional credentials to land a quality, high-paying job. In 2014, LaunchCode was named "The Best Thing to Happen to St. Louis" by the St. Louis Riverfront Times. In February 2019, LaunchCode received a $300,000 grant from the Ewing Marion Kauffman Foundation to support education programming.

== Philanthropy ==
In 2016, McKelvey donated $15 million to the Washington University School of Engineering and Applied Science to build a new computer science and engineering building, named after his father. In 2019, Washington University's engineering school was renamed the McKelvey School of Engineering.

== Published works ==
- McKelvey, Jim (2020). The Innovation Stack: Building an Unbeatable Business One Crazy Idea at a Time. Penguin Publishing Group. ISBN 978-0-593-08674-2.
- McKelvey, James (2006). The Art Of Fire: Beginning Glassblowing. Third Degree Glass Factory. ISBN 0978683102.
