= Cash App =

American mobile payment service

- Former name: Square Cash
- Available in: English
- Area served: United States
- Creators: Jack Dorsey; Brian Grassadonia
- Industry: Digital wallet
- Services: Peer-to-peer payment; Savings account; Debit card; Investing in stocks, bitcoin; Tax filing; Personal loan
- Revenue: ▲$16.25 billion (2024)
- Parent: Block, Inc.
- Website: cash.app
- Users: ▲57 million users (2024)
- Launched: October 2013; 12 years ago
- Current status: Active

Cash App (formerly Square Cash) is a digital wallet for American consumers. Launched by Block, Inc., in 2013, it allows users to send, receive, and save money; access debit cards; invest in stocks and bitcoin; apply for personal loans; and file taxes. As of 2024, Cash App reports 57 million users and $283 billion in annual inflows.

Cash App was launched in 2013 as a person-to-person money transfer service, Square Cash. In 2015, the service expanded to support transactions involving businesses. Later, it gained more features, including debit cards, savings accounts, bitcoin and stock investing, tax filing, and personal loans, and was rebranded as Cash App. As of 2024, the service operates as a mobile app-based digital wallet, and is the preferred payment app among lower-income adults in the U.S.

== History ==
=== 2013–2015: Launch, early years ===
Cash App was launched by Block, Inc. (then named Square, Inc.) on October 13, 2013. It was originally branded as Square Cash. It aimed to help users send money to one another with a debit card via email or text message, regardless of what bank each party used. Block's cofounder Jack Dorsey and Brian Grassadonia contributed to the product creation.

Square Cash allowed users to send up to $2,500 a week in several transactions or all at once, and worked only in the U.S. It was meant only for person-to-person money transfers, and not for online or off-line shopping. In August 2014, Block said that Square Cash users had sent "hundreds of millions of dollars" to one another. In March 2015, Square introduced Square Cash for businesses. This allowed individuals, organizations, and business owners to create a unique username to send and receive money, known as a $cashtag.

=== 2016–2020: Feature additions ===
In September 2016, Cash App announced a guarantee of "instant deposit" for the money received via Cash App, if the user agreed to pay a 1% fee. Users would otherwise see deposits post to their Cash App account on the next business day. Block also introduced virtual payment cards that allow Cash App users to make purchases on websites and apps using money stored in the app.

In January 2018, Cash App added support for bitcoin trading. In October 2019, Cash App added support for stock trading to users in the United States. In November 2020, Square announced it was acquiring Credit Karma Tax, a free do-it-yourself tax-filing service, for $50 million and would make it a part of its Cash App unit.

=== 2021–present: Growth, U.S. focus ===
In 2021, Block announced an extension of the Cash App service to people over 13 years old for depositing and spending money or sending it to friends. Minors would not have access to investing or bitcoin features, however, and would still need their parent or guardians’ permission and significant oversight to use the app. According to a Pew Research Center report in September 2022, Cash App was found to have been used at least once by 26% of U.S. adults. The report also stated that lower-income adults were the most likely to use the app over other payment apps.

In August 2023, Block announced a closure of Cash App's operations in the European Union under the "Verse" brand, citing a lack of growth and profitability in the market. On September 7 and 8, 2023, Cash App experienced a service outage, affecting peer-to-peer payments and cash card purchases for thousands of users. Block stated on September 8 that the service was restored successfully by that day. In February 2024, the service reported 57 million monthly transacting user accounts, $14.7 billion in revenues and $248 billion in inflows for the year 2023. In June 2024, Block announced it was dropping its plan to launch Cash App in Australia. In the following month, Cash App announced it would cease operations in the United Kingdom on September 15, 2024.

In August 2024, Cash App settled a $15 million class-action settlement for data and security breaches at the service. Users whose accounts were accessed without their authorization or who had fraudulent withdrawals or transfers could file claims for up to $2500, provided they had an account between August 23, 2018, and August 20, 2024. The class-action pointed to a security breach in 2021, and another in 2023. As part of the settlement, Cash App and Block also agreed to take steps toward strengthening data security, while denying any wrongdoing.

In January 2025, Block agreed to pay, as part of a settlement, a fine of $80 million to a group of 48 state financial regulators after the agencies determined the company had insufficient policies for policing money laundering through Cash App. As part of the settlement, the company also agreed to involve an independent consultant to review its Bank Secrecy Act and anti-money laundering program, and report back to the states on any deficiencies. Block stated at the time that the issues were mainly related to Cash App's prior compliance program, and the company has significantly increased investment in compliance and risk management. In February 2025, Block reported that Cash App had $16.25 billion in annual revenues and $282.9 billion in annual inflows for the year 2024.

== Services ==
=== Banking ===
The service allows users to send, receive, and store money within the United States, although international transfers were not initially supported. Users can transfer money out of Cash App to a bank account in their country. The Cash Card is a customizable debit card that allows users to spend their money at various retailers and withdraw cash from an ATM. When signing up for the Cash Card, users can customize it by selecting a color, adding stamps, drawing on it, and even making the card glow in the dark. The card with the final design is mailed to the user.

As of March 7, 2018, the Cash App supports automated clearing house (ACH) direct deposits. Cash App also supports cash deposits, called "Paper Money Deposits": cash is taken to a participating retailer, who scans a barcode to deposit the money with Cash App, which charges a fee of $1 or more, depending on the retailer. As of August 2024, Cash App offers a 4.5% annual percentage yield (APY) on savings, provided that the account is set up to receive a monthly direct deposit of at least $300. Balances stored on the Cash App Card are FDIC-insured through Wells Fargo Bank for up to $250,000 per person.

=== Peer-to-peer money transfer ===
Users can request money from and transfer to other Cash App accounts via phone number, email, or $cashtag.

=== Cryptocurrency ===
In 2018, the capability to buy and sell bitcoin cryptocurrency was added to the app.

=== Investing ===
In 2020, the capability to trade stocks was added to the app for users in the United States.

=== Personal loans ===
In October 2023, it was reported that Cash App allowed a subset of users to request short-term loans ranging from $20 to $200 directly through the app. These loans typically come with a four-week repayment period and a flat 5% fee.

=== Tax filing ===
In November 2020, Square acquired the tax-preparation division of Credit Karma, rolling it into the Cash App offering as Cash App Taxes. The service offers online tax filing in the US, and is free to use for consumers, as it was before the acquisition. In March 2023, USA Today rated it "best overall", while noting that it didn't accommodate "every tax situation".

== Finances ==
As of November 1, 2021, Square had a market capitalization of $117.4 billion. Its largest market competitor is PayPal, which owns Venmo. Other major competitors include Apple Pay, Google Pay, and Zelle.

=== Business model ===
Cash App is free to download for Android devices from Google Play, for iOS devices from the Apple App Store, and other mobile store platforms. Because the app is initially free, it incentivizes more users to create an account and use its services. Additional services beyond standard money transfers are available for small initial fixed costs plus percentage fees. Cash App's primary income is from users withdrawing funds from the app to their linked bank accounts. Money can be transferred into a third-party bank account without charge within five business days, or instantly for a 0.5%–1.75% fee (minimum $0.25).

If users do not have a direct deposit account with the app, they will be charged a $2 fee for withdrawing money from an ATM. Cash App allows users to buy and sell bitcoin from their platform for a small service fee based on the current bitcoin market volatility. Businesses can also accept Cash App as a form of payment and charge a transaction cost of 2.75%. Like banks, Cash App can lend money deposited by users to various institutions, charging interest, known as money creation. Cash App is required to hold 10% of users' accounts liquidity as part of the fractional-reserve banking to protect depositors in the event of a bank run.

== Consumer safety and fraud ==
Cash App is among a group of peer-to-peer payment platforms—such as Zelle, Apple Pay and Google Pay—that do not provide features to recover money sent by users to others. The app states that it uses multi-factor authentication and account transaction limits to prevent fraud. Cash App uses standard encryption and fraud detection technology to protect users' data. Cash App and other payment platforms including Zelle, Venmo, Apple Pay and Google Pay have been reported as targets for Internet fraud. Common scams include customer support impersonation, fake offers and programs, and the selling of fake expensive items. There is little buyer protection, making these scams hard to dispute, unlike payment services such as PayPal.

Since the start of the COVID-19 pandemic and the rise in use of payment apps, there has been an increase in reported scams. In one instance, a man was scammed out of $24,000 by customer-support impersonation. In another instance, a scammer used the public video of a Waffle House worker holding a baby in a kitchen to fabricate an emotional story. The scammer used social media to share their Cash App information in the hope of receiving donations. Millennials often use payment platforms like Cash App and Venmo to pay for illegal drugs and to gamble. In June 2021, police in West Baltimore arrested seven people for using Cash App to sell cocaine and heroin in nearby neighborhoods.

== Cultural impact ==
In 2018, Cash App surpassed Venmo in total downloads (33.5 million cumulative), becoming one of the most popular peer-to-peer payment platforms. Cash App is mentioned by about 200 hip-hop artists in their song lyrics, leading some to assert that it is now "ingrained in hip-hop culture", with its popularity stemming from the Black community in Atlanta. Some cite the early adoption of cryptocurrencies among members of the rap community as another reason for Cash App's cultural cachet. The popularity of the app in hip-hop is reflected in Square's partnerships with prominent rappers, such as Travis Scott, Megan Thee Stallion, and Cardi B. Social media influencers frequently use Cash App to request donations from their followers. Every Friday since 2017, Twitter users retweet posts from the official Cash App account with the #SuperCashAppFriday hashtag to potentially win $10,000 to $50,000. These posts often have a notable amount of engagement.
