= Finder (website) =

- Trade name: Finder
- Type: Private
- Industry: Finance and insurance
- Founded: 2006
- Founders: Fred Schebesta, Frank Restuccia, Jeremy Cabral
- Headquarters: Sydney, Australia
- Products: Financial services
- Website: https://www.finder.com.au and https://www.finder.com

Finder is a comparison website. It operates sites in 4 countries and has over 300 employees, with 5 million visitors a month worldwide. As of 2018, it was the most-visited comparison site in Australia.

== History ==
The creditcardfinder.com.au site was launched in 2006 by Fred Schebesta and Frank Restuccia, using $1.36 million raised from their sale of previous company Freestyle Media. Schebesta, Restuccia and co-founder Jeremy Cabral, who joined Finder in 2008, are all featured on the 2020 Australian Financial Review Young Rich list. The main Finder site launched in 2012. A US version of the site launched in July 2015.

The Finder app was launched in 2020 for iOS and Android. The company spent $5 million developing it and signed up 118,000 users by November 2020.

In 2022, Finder was ranked as the number 1 Australian business in the KPMG-HSBC Emerging Giants of Asia Pacific report and ranked 17th throughout the APAC region.

=== Comparison products ===
Finder compares products in over 100 categories. Its comparisons include credit cards, home loans, bank accounts, insurance, mobile phones and plans, broadband, shopping coupons, Internet TV and energy. Unlike many other comparison sites, it is not owned by or affiliated with an insurance provider.
