= Afterpay =

Australian financial technology company

Afterpay Limited
- Company type: Subsidiary
- Founded: October 2014; 12 years ago
- Area served: List of countries: United States; Australia; Canada; France; Italy; New Zealand; Spain; United Kingdom
- Founders: Nick Molnar; Anthony Eisen
- Industry: Financial technology
- Services: Buy now, pay later
- Revenue: ▲US$1.04 billion (2023)
- Parent: Block, Inc.
- Subsidiaries: List of companies: Afterpay Holdings Pty Ltd; Afterpay U.S., Inc.; Afterpay Australia Pty Ltd; Touchcorp Limited; Clearpay Finance Limited; Afterpay Canada Limited
- Website: afterpay.com
- Users: ▲24 million users (2023); 348,000 merchants (2024)
- Current status: Active
- Native clients on: Android, iOS, Windows

Afterpay Limited (abbreviated as Afterpay) is an Australian technology company and a buy now, pay later (BNPL) lender. Founded in 2014 by Nick Molnar and Anthony Eisen, it is now owned by Block, Inc. As of 2023, Afterpay serves 24 million users, processes US$27.3 billion in annual payments, and ranks among the three most-used BNPL services globally.

Afterpay offers unsecured installment loans allowing shoppers to make in-store or online purchases, and then repay with a fortnightly frequency. It does not charge fees or interest to the consumers, unless they miss scheduled repayments, and does not check or affect the credit scores. The company charges merchants for offering its service, requiring that the charge is not passed on to shoppers. As of 2024, Afterpay operates as a subsidiary of Block, Inc., following an acquisition in 2021, and maintains presence in the U.S., Australia, Canada, France, Italy, Spain and the U.K.

== History ==
=== Founding and early growth (2014–2017) ===
In April 2014, Molnar, a Sydney-based jewelry salesman at the time, partnered with a product manager and an engineering manager in Melbourne to design a financial product he had conceived. The concept targeted online retailers focused on sales growth and shoppers looking for a way to receive goods upfront while paying later. The resulting design offered two interest-free options for consumers, ensuring the product remained outside Australia’s credit regulations. The first, "Pay After Delivery", allowed users to wait 30 days before making a payment, similar to using a credit card. The second, "Pay Over Time", let users divide their bill into four installments over a maximum of 60 days.

Later, in October 2014, Molnar and his neighbor, Eisen, formerly a chief investment officer at the Australian holding company Guinness Peat Group, co-founded Afterpay in their home in the suburb of Rose Bay, Sydney. They pursued the repayment option involving four interest-free installments. As the company grew, Molnar began encouraging consumers to contact their favorite retailers and request that they offer Afterpay, resulting in an effective social media campaign.

On 4 May 2016, the company listed on the Australian Securities Exchange with an A$25 million IPO.^{[note a]} According to the Sydney Morning Herald in August 2016, Afterpay was being used at more than 300 retailers and had signed up more than 100,000 shoppers, financing $20 million worth of purchases in the quarter ending June 2016. Afterpay generated income from charging retail merchants, not customers, and Molnar claimed that "many customers" paid back money early. At that time, the Consumer Action Law Centre, an Australian consumer advocacy organization, cautioned that although shoppers were not paying interest to the company, they might end up paying interest anyway.

In March 2017, Molnar stated that Afterpay had 2600 retail merchants on its platform and that the company was growing its presence into the physical stores of its retail partners. In October 2017, he said Afterpay had grown to serve more than one million customers and over 7000 retailers, adding "only 20 percent" of the company's revenue came from late fees, and "about 80 percent" came from retailers. Afterpay reportedly managed to avoid being subject to Australia's national credit code, because the lender didn't charge interest and offered short-term credit to be repaid in less than 62 days.

=== International growth (2018–2019) ===
In January 2018, American venture capital fund Matrix Partners announced its intention to invest A$19.4 million in Afterpay to support its entry into the U.S. retail market. Afterpay was launched in the U.S. in mid-May 2018 with retailers such as Anthropologie, Free People, and Urban Outfitters. In August 2018, Afterpay acquired 90 percent of the equity in "Clearpay", a U.K. based BNPL service, for a total consideration of one million Afterpay shares.

With reported underlying sales of A$4.7 billion in the 11 months to May 2019, Afterpay raised A$317.2 million in fresh capital through a share issue in June 2019, in part to help fund its international growth. Two months later, the company revealed that it had over two million active users and 6,500 merchants in the U.S. and announced a strategic partnership with Visa Inc. In its 2019 financial year update, the company announced that its growth in the U.K. was faster than that of the U.S., with more than 200,000 U.K. customers joining in the first 15 weeks. This year also saw former World Bank Chief Economist Larry Summers join Afterpay to advise it on its U.S. expansion.

=== Pandemic growth (2020) ===
On 21 May 2020, Afterpay announced that its operations had grown to five million active customers in the U.S. During the COVID-19 pandemic, many retailers closed physical stores and potential customers were increasingly hesitant to shop in-person. The Australian Financial Review commented that the company's growth was spurred by "investors [who] are seeking exposure to e-commerce as the coronavirus crisis pushes more shopping online, and continuing government stimulus will keep bad debts low”. In 2020, Afterpay unveiled plans to expand its services to at least four continents, including Asia, to capitalize on the online shopping surge brought by the COVID-19 pandemic. This plan would entail the acquisition of Singapore-based, Indonesia-focused buy-now-pay-later service EmpatKali. Over the eleven months following March 2020, Afterpay's share price rose from A$9 to A$160. This period also saw an investment of A$300 million, paid in May 2020, from the Chinese company Tencent in return for a 5 per cent equity stake in the lender. Afterpay had not delivered a profit or paid out any dividends by this time.

=== Acquisition by Block, Inc. (2021) ===
By June 2021, Afterpay was available at nearly 100,000 merchants globally. It was estimated that the company's average customer in Australia was 33 years old and eight of ten customers were women. In August 2021, Afterpay and Block, Inc. (then named "Square, Inc."), announced that Afterpay would be acquired by Block. Square paid Afterpay A$39 billion (US$29 billion) in stock for the acquisition. Afterpay said its underlying sales rose 90 per cent over the 2021 financial year, to A$21.1 billion and that the number of customers actively using the platform rose to 16.2 million, up from 9.9 million in June 2020. The lender operated in Australia, the U.S., Canada and New Zealand, as well as in the U.K., France, Italy and Spain as Clearpay by this time. It was also reported that Molnar and Eisen would lead Afterpay's merchant and consumer businesses inside Block. Shares of Afterpay, listed in Australia, closed higher after the acquisition news. According to Yahoo Finance in October 2021, Afterpay was among the top two most popular BNPL services in the U.S. In November 2021, Afterpay announced that it would launch BNPL for subscriptions, such as for gym memberships and entertainment subscriptions, to U.S. customers.

On January 12, 2022, the Bank of Spain approved Block's takeover bid of Afterpay, marking the final hurdle in the acquisition merger. On January 19, 2022, Afterpay suspended trading of its shares on the ASX. On January 20, 2022, the merged entity trading as Block commenced trading on the ASX under the ticker SQ2. On January 31, 2022, Block completed the acquisition of Afterpay, officially making it a subsidiary.

In 2023, Bank of America Securities identified Afterpay as the leading BNPL service in the U.S. and one of the top three BNPL services globally, both rankings based on monthly active users.

=== Recent growth (2021–present) ===
In February 2024, Axios reported that Afterpay contributed US$1.04 billion in revenue and US$755 million in gross profit to Block in 2023, while processing US$27.3 billion in payments. According to Radio New Zealand in July 2024, Afterpay reported having 24 million global customers as of December 2023 and stated that 95% of customer repayments were made on time during January–March 2024. In November 2024, City A.M. reported that Afterpay claimed a merchant base of 348,000 in five countries and that Molnar was promoted in August 2024 to become Block's "head of sales".

== Business model ==
=== Consumer service ===
Afterpay provides short-term, unsecured installment loans that allow consumers to make purchases immediately and repay the balance over time. Transactions are typically split into four payments over a six-week period, including an initial upfront payment of approximately 25% of the total purchase price. Repayments are interest-free, but late fees may be applied if scheduled payments are missed.

=== Revenue model ===
Afterpay generates revenue primarily by charging merchants transaction and payment processing fees for offering the service to customers. It does not charge fees to consumers who make payments on time, though late payment fees may contribute a smaller portion of its income.

=== Credit checks and reporting ===
Afterpay does not perform traditional credit checks when approving consumers and does not report repayment activity to credit bureaus. Afterpay uses a proprietary risk model to assess customers, including looking at the value of the order (a lower order value may be more likely to be approved), the amount of funds the consumer has on their debit or credit card, and the length of time they have been using Afterpay. The lender rejects about 20% of transactions based on creditworthiness. In 2020, it had to write off less than 1% of sales due to customers not paying back.

== Impact, criticism and regulation ==
The rise of BNPL services such as Afterpay has been cited as a cause of decreasing credit card use in Australia.

Millennials are Afterpay's main customer demographic, accounting for 75% of all users. Another significant segment of Afterpay's customer base is university students, of which one third have been found to use short-term borrowing. Afterpay has also been criticized as being harmful to consumers. Studies have found that in order to keep up with payments, some users experience financial stress, incurring debt and neglecting essential needs. Market commentators suggest that while BNPL payment options (such as Afterpay and its competitors) are showing significant upside for investors, such growth may not be sustained unless the company continues to show that it is able to generate larger basket sizes (i.e., extra sales that consumers would not otherwise have made).

In 2018, Afterpay announced it earned 24.4% of its income from late fees and 75.6% from merchant fees. From 2018 to 2019, the number of credit card accounts dropped nearly 5% from 16.7 million to 15.89 million, with 69% of millennials using their credit card less as a result of Afterpay.

In April 2019, legislation was passed to provide the Australian Securities & Investments Commission (ASIC) with "Product Intervention Powers" (PIP). These powers provide ASIC with authority to intervene where it identifies a risk of significant detriment to retail consumers (including those using BNPL services like Afterpay). Afterpay supported the introduction of these powers as a way to provide regulatory oversight and protect consumers. In June 2019, the company disclosed that it was under probe by AUSTRAC for potential breaches of the Anti-Money Laundering and Counter-Terrorism Financing Act 2006 (AML/CTF regulations). The company was said to be "in dialogue" with the regulators, and the outcome of the probe has yet to be determined. AUSTRAC, upon identifying several concerns with its compliance, ordered the appointment of an external auditor at Afterpay's expense to examine its compliance with the AML/CTF regulations. PRObono Australia said in 2019 that it was "putting vulnerable young people into vicious cycles of debt that follow them long after they stop spending". Despite this negative press, in 2019, it was reported that 95% of payments had not incurred a late fee.

In February 2020, Afterpay was reported to have 3.6 million active customers in the U.S., 3.1 million in Australia and New Zealand, and 600,000 in the U.K. In November 2020, the ASIC released a report on the BNPL industry, highlighting the need for consumer protections via existing and impending regulatory changes, yet did not call for any new regulation.

The Australian Finance Industry Association's Code of Practice, which came into effect on 1 March 2021, is voluntary, so it does not have the teeth of financial regulation. BNPL platforms charge no interest to its customers, and hence are not subject to Australia's Credit Act. However, during June 2022, the Albanese Government announced that it planned to regulate the BNPL sector under the Credit Act.

In November 2023, Afterpay came under fire on A Current Affair for holding funds from allegedly high-risk businesses, causing a liquidity crisis for many small businesses. Small businesses are at a particularly high risk of having their cash reserves depleted due to delayed payment from Afterpay, often as much as three months. Afterpay's use of a 'rolling reserve' means that individual businesses can be out tens of thousands for up to three months, with these funds only gradually released in the form of micropayments e.g. $50 at a time, but not the interest on these funds. Customer use of Afterpay is so high for some businesses, however, that opting out may translate to significant lost business.

== Notes ==
- ^[note a]: Guardian Australia reported that Afterpay raised A$125 million to list on the ASX; however, A$25 million was raised.
