= Buy now, pay later =

Consumer lending approach

Buy now, pay later (BNPL) is a type of short-term debt financing that allows consumers to make purchases while only initially paying for a portion of their value, postponing payment of the remainder of the debt until a future date, or dividing it into a series of installment payments. BNPL is generally structured like a hire purchase or installment plan money lending process that involves consumers, financiers, and merchants. Financiers pay merchants on behalf of the consumers when goods or services are purchased by the latter. These payments are later repaid by the consumers over time in equal installments. The number of installments and the repayment period vary, depending on the BNPL financier.

== History ==
The earliest form of BNPL traces back to the 19th century, when installment plans emerged as a way for consumers to purchase expensive goods (e.g. furniture, pianos and farm equipment) they did not have the funds to buy outright.

=== Earlier examples and similar concepts ===
Sources discussing the topic.

=== Modern era and emergence of the industry ===
In the early 21st century, fintech companies developed systems that allowed installment plan lending to be integrated into the payment flow of online shops, allowing a consumer to receive instant credit at the point of sale and pay for a purchase later, based on an agreed schedule. The integration and instant processing elements are what set BNPL apart from other approaches to consumer lending.

A 2021 survey by Mambu attempting to identify emerging 'financial tribes' in the banking world found that the use of online financial/banking services was expanding significantly amid the COVID-19 pandemic, and was likely to continue to increase thereafter.

The model first found success in the fashion industry; online stores devoted to such offerings were among the first to accept and widely use low-cost BNPL techniques amid the pandemic. It emerged amid a massive outgrowth in advertising by Gen-Z influencers on social media.

Website-building platforms such as Wix and Shopify allow merchants to integrate third-party payment providers that offer BNPL services at checkout.

=== History by country ===
==== Australia ====
Use of digital banking and payment services among Australians increased significantly over the course of the COVID-19 pandemic. Yet this was a continuation from trends seen prior to it, and it's likely that its consequences served to hasten existing processes. Between 2017 and 2019, the total value of BNPL transactions in Australia increased dramatically. By 2021, nearly 20% of Australia's 10 million BNPL users had missed a payment on a loan.

Afterpay and Zip Co accounted for more than 60% of the market in Australia by March 2021, according to a Survey from Finder. An earlier UBS report had suggested that up to 18 percent of AfterPay users were also on JobSeeker, a government unemployment benefits scheme, though this was later refuted by Afterpay, whose internal study showed less of their userbase registered with the program than the national average.

A 2021 survey by Statista found that roughly two-thirds of Gen Z Australians had used a buy now pay later service in the six months preceding the study. Data released by the Reserve Bank of Australia and Parliament showed the two platforms shared more than 5 million Australian and New Zealander users between them in 2020, and they were available at 53,000 and 30 thousand merchants respectively. (Note: Value refers to Zip Pay, a consumer offering of the latter company) A year later, the BNPL userbase sat at 10 million in Australia alone.

A 2021 Mambu survey found that nearly 24% of Australians reported regular use of BNPL for online shopping, the highest of any country surveyed. It was initially only offered as an online service in the country, but began to spread to 'point-of-sale' locations in the late 2010s and early 2020s. It was reported in September that young Australians were taking increasingly extreme measures in order to make payments, including skipping meals. In 2021, Australia had the largest uptake in BNPL usership of any country, with 38% of Australians reporting BNPL usership by March 2022.

By 2023, use of BNPL had grown at an exponential rate. The total value of BNPL transactions in Australia was estimated at nearly $20bn, with nearly 50 million transactions taking place. The former represented a doubling, the latter a tripling, in usage compared to 2020.

==== India ====
In India, BNPL is considered similar to the country's traditional paper-based Udhar Khata system, where corner shops, known as kiranas locally, kept manually logged credit ledgers to allow their customers to buy provisions on credit and repay them later.

==== Indonesia ====
The existence of BNPL in Indonesia began in 2016 when fintech platforms from the E-Commerce and ride hailing sectors launched proprietary BNPL systems as an alternate form of payment. These platforms are referred to as pinjol or pinjaman online. Its initial success was attributed to poor credit penetration among Indonesians. Many such services act as revolving credit, where users are free to withdraw recurrently so long as they remain within the lending limit; early repayments increase the user's borrowing limit. Currently, there are 96 registered BNPL providers, 7 of which are Sharia-certified.

In June 2025, OJK reported that pinjol still made up less than 0.3% of the total Indonesian credit market, yet its growth was higher than other forms of debt instruments, reaching 30% year-on-year, totaling up to IDR 22.9 trillion. The total number of pinjol registered accounts reached 15.4 million as of the first fiscal quarter of 2025. However, defaults among pinjol users increased at a higher rate than the growth of actual loan disbursement. In Q1 2024, out of the IDR 16.55 trillion in outstanding pinjol in West Java alone, IDR 650 billion were considered to be bad loans.

==== New Zealand ====
Buy now, pay later (BNPL) services became widely used in New Zealand during the late 2010s as e-commerce expanded and financial technology firms entered the retail payments market. Major BNPL providers operating in the country include Afterpay, Zip, Laybuy, and Klarna.

==== Philippines ====
Buy now, pay later (BNPL) services have developed as part of the Philippines' digital finance and e-commerce sectors. One of the early providers was BillEase, which launched in 2017 and initially partnered with the online shopping platform Lazada. By 2022, BNPL services were also being offered through major e-commerce platforms, including Shopee's SPayLater and Lazada's LazPayLater, the latter of which was powered by CIMB Bank Philippines.

==== United Kingdom ====
In 2021, it was estimated that £4 in every £100 spent in the UK used buy now pay later mechanisms. At that time, roughly 3/4 of users were women, the same figure were under the age of 36, and 90% of financing was for fashion products. BNPL schemes at that time were not regulated.

==== United States ====
The COVID-19 pandemic and its aftermath produced a massive increase in BNPL transactions in the United States. The disproportionately broad-scale effects of the lockdown imposition and various debt relief efforts which followed may have contributed to a massive jump in transaction values, from $2 billion in 2019 to $24.2 billion in 2021. In 2020, buy now pay later financing as a payment method was offered in $97 billion (roughly 2.1%) of national e-commerce sales. This growth was driven principally by young consumers, who made up a massively disproportionate share of the emerging BNPL user market. (Note: nearly 75% in 2021, down from 80% in 2018) In the same year, polling done by The Ascent found that nearly 45% of US adult BNPL users used BNPL services to finance services they wouldn't reasonably otherwise be able to pay for.

It has been reported by the Consumer Financial Protection Bureau that more than 1 in 5 American consumers with a credit record had used BNPL services at some point in 2022, up from 17.8% in 2021. LexisNexis had received 95% more digital application screenings for BNPL services than in 2021, and had "directly observed 25% of U.S. adult consumers finance a purchase using BNPL" in 2022. BNPL lenders approved 78% of loan applications that year.

Only 9% of overall consumers were using buy now pay later in the fall of 2023, though this represented a 40% increase from 2 years earlier, according to data from the Federal Reserve Bank of Boston. Multiple service providers, including Klarna and Affirm, described an explosion in the use of their services during this same period.

===== Present =====
In 2024, consumer credit balances (household debt) reached an all-time high, though have since declined in the first quarter of 2025. This has largely resulted from an economy-wide increase in credit card debt. Estimates from the previous year found that buy now pay later purchases comprised nearly $46 billion in transactions, roughly a third of the overall volume of American credit card debt that year.

A 2025 LendingTree survey found that nearly a quarter of American BNPL users relied upon the service to finance groceries, up from 14% a year earlier, pointing to increasing economic pressure on US households. The same survey found nearly half of respondents had reported using a BNPL service at some point, with more than a third saying they had used it more than once. If accurate, it would represent anywhere from a near 33% increase to near doubling of usage of BNPL services in the country in the course of a year.

News outlets have pointed to the increase in 'micro-loans' as a sign of stress amid rising prices and volatility in the US economy; others have argued that fears of a recession have driven interest in flexible, long-term payment options for products and services that consumers might not otherwise be able to finance. Experts are hesitant to label this an indicator of recession, though other observers have noted that the volume of American household debt is increasing, and the country's credit balance sits at a record high.

According to a survey from the Federal Reserve Bank of New York, more than 40% of purchases made by financially-stable American borrowers in 2024 were valued at less than $250. (Note: roughly 60% of total purchases were less than $750 in sum) Middle tier purchases were rarer, with loans between $1750 and $2000 accounting for roughly 18% of total purchases.

== Usage and market functions ==
BNPL has been described as "similar to a credit card but without the hassles of an application process, card-swiping infrastructure, and separate limits for purchases and cash withdrawals". Unlike traditional loans, it is a 'point-of-sale' product, and offers immediate relief in the form of a short-term loan to any consumer willing to accept its terms. It has been presented as an option for those with low credit limits or who lack credit cards entirely.

BNPL payment scheme and methods of provider and merchant revenue receipt

=== Transaction process ===
Retailers that partner with BNPL financiers can offer customers the option to pay for purchases using BNPL. If a customer opts to complete the purchase using BNPL, the financier will typically carry out a soft credit check (Note: 'Soft' credit checks do not impact a customer's credit score, in contrast to 'hard' checks which can.) on the customer, and return a decision within seconds. The financier pays the merchant if approval is received, and offers the customer various repayment options. These may include delaying the payment for a short period of time, or spreading the full balance over several smaller payments. Grace periods on the debt can range anywhere from two weeks to a year or more. Typically, money is drawn directly and automatically from a user's credit or debit account.

The service is offered for free to the customer, assuming repayment is made. This is often fronted financially by retail partners; in some cases merchants will pay nearly twice the rate charged by other credit-card issuers given the lucrativeness of the enterprise. BNPL financiers take a cut from the purchase price of anything they help the merchant to sell. This fee tends to be higher than typical credit or debit card transactions, with processing fees ranging from 2% to 8% per transaction, compared to 1.3% to 3.5% for credit cards; this may vary by country. Merchants, though, are typically prevented from passing that cost on to consumers via a 'no-surcharge' clause, in contrast to what is typical for most other credit services.

Credit limits for BNPL services are typically high, and repayment terms can range anywhere from six weeks to 5 years. Though interest-rates on the debt are typically low or absent on account of brand-service partnerships, they can sometimes be as high as 30%. Repayment of BNPL loans doesn't normally serve to benefit one's credit score. Reporting is generally biased towards late payments, which do serve to lower it if steps are not taken to repay them and avoid future delinquency.

Additional, non-credit related services occasionally offered by BNPL providers, typically services that provide it as part of a digital wallet mechanism, include "enhanced security, bill splitting, discounts, online coupons, loyalty card storage, [and] cross-border remittance payments."

==== Late fees and consequences of default ====
When consumers fall behind on payments, late fees are typically charged by their financiers, and persistently delinquent accounts may be sold to debt collection agencies. Laybuy, a New Zealand financial firm since acquired by Klarna, typically limited late fees in the United Kingdom to $24 for a single order, and sought the assistance of debt collection agencies in around 1% of total orders. Conversely, American regulators have described these charges as 'junk fees', raising concerns about the imposition of multiple fees on singular missed payments, and the potential for firms to institute more aggressive practices as a result of broader trends in the global marketplace.

Analysis of consumer data in the United States has found that BNPL accounts default at a lower rate than do credit-card accounts, which can likely be attributed to the requirement by many of the former that users set up automatic repayment mechanisms. This requirement has been criticized by regulators, who see it as constraining consumers' economic choice and thus endangering their capacity to service other debts or meet more pressing financial concerns, such as food, rent, or utility bills. In 2022, the Consumer Financial Protection Bureau described 'autopay' mechanisms as "adversely limit[ing] consumer choice and flexibility to elect or change payment methods, or to skip a BNPL payment to satisfy other financial obligations." Between 2019 and 2022, borrowers defaulted on roughly 2% of BNPL-linked accounts, compared with a default rate of 10% for other credit accounts in the same period.

=== Consumer habits ===
==== Low-income vs. high-income households ====
Low- and high-income households fundamentally differ in their use of BNPL services, as shown in both consumer surveys and economic data. Low-income earners are more likely to use BNPL services, though consumer credit is a stronger indicator of usage. According to LendingTree data, high-income borrowers are among the most likely to miss a payment, though parents with young children are another notable group. In 2024, grocery purchases accounted for 40% of the total value of online BNPL loans worldwide, compared with roughly 12% for electronics. Usage is prevalent among nearly every income group.

===== Financial fragility/stability =====
Data from the Federal Reserve Bank of New York has shown that BNPL loan usage is particularly high in financially fragile (Note: having a credit score lower than 620) households. Almost 60% of financially fragile households were found to have used BNPL more than five times in the past year. More than two-thirds of financially stable (Note: all other respondents) BNPL users surveyed had used such services twice, but less than a quarter had gone further. People with limited access to credit are three times more likely to use BNPL services, regardless of income. Usage is prevalent among every credit segment, though.

BNPL users are far more likely than traditional consumers to be in financial distress at the time of application. They are 12% more likely than traditional banking applicants to have filed for bankruptcy, 43% more likely to be lien holders, and 118% more likely to be or have been in dispute with their landlord.

==== Age gap and differences ====
In March 2024, NBC News reported on a LexisNexis risk assessment study which found that US consumers ages 35 and under comprise 53% of “buy now, pay later” users but just 35% of traditional credit card holders. Young borrowers are among the most likely to miss a payment. In the same year, BNPL-linked debt accounted for 28% of unsecured credit obligations among Americans aged 18–24, compared with roughly 17% for other age groups.

==== Gender differences ====
The exponential growth in the use of BNPL services in the late 2010s and early 2020s can largely be attributed to female borrowers, though the statistical disparity in usage between genders has decreased in recent years, and men are now more likely than women to have used a BNPL service in the United States. This shift was seen as early as 2021, where only 51% of women in a consumer survey had used a BNPL service, compared with 63% of male respondents. Men are among the most likely to miss a payment on BNPL loans, and are more likely than women to believe that the use of such services will benefit their credit score.

==== Key markets ====
===== Food and grocery =====
Multiple outlets have noted the results of LendingTree's report which states that nearly a quarter of Americans rely upon BNPL services to finance groceries. Experts have noted that this is one of many means by which Americans are attempting to extend their financing amid rising inflation and increasing uncertainty in the US economy.

The announcement that Klarna would partner with Doordash, a food and grocery delivery company, prompted public outcry online. Many users saw it as an indication of increasing frivolity and thoughtlessness among American consumers, and as a potential indicator of a looming credit crisis. Similar services, though, are already offered by Walmart, and on Grubhub, a rival platform.

In a response to online criticism, a Klarna spokesperson acknowledged concerns surrounding the financial security of prospective users, responding that "[i]f people are in a situation where they feel like they have to put their food on credit, that’s a bad indicator for society." She pushed back, though, in stating that steps had been taken to reduce the potential for significant incursion of debt by users, and that consumers make a "'rational decision'" to use BNPL as a money management tool. Users are given the option to pay in four installments or in a sequence that may align with their paycheck schedule, and BNPL is restricted on the platform to purchases less than $35.

===== Travel and experience =====
A 2025 Billboard report showed that nearly 60% of Coachella attendees had used a BNPL payment option to finance their ticket. Data from Afterpay between 2022 and 2023 showed that the value of travel ticket purchases on the platform by Gen Z and Millennial users had grown almost fifteen-fold* (Note: 1430%) over that period. Some observers have questioned the sustainability of such a financing pattern in the leisure and experience industry on a broad scale.

== Legal interpretation and regulation by country ==
=== Australia ===
==== BNPL Code of Practice ====
Australian BNPL providers, like much of the world, were initially subject to little regulation. At a basic level, BNPL providers fell under the provisions of the 2001 Securities and Investments Commission Act, and were thus "prevented from engaging in misleading, deceptive or unconscionable conduct in relation to their services."

The Buy Now Pay Later (BNPL) Code of Practice is a voluntary regulatory framework established in 2021 that set out best-practices for members of the industry. The Code was developed by the Australian Financial Industry Firm, an industry body representing prominent BNPL service providers worldwide. The code came into effect on March 1 2021.

==== BNPL Code Compliance Committee ====
The BNPL Code Compliance Committee, which governs accreditation according to the BNPLCP standards, is independently governed and is responsible for investigating Code Compliant Members. It is made up of a consumer representative (nominated by the Consumers Federation of Australia), an industry representative, and an independent chair (who is required to have been a former deputy chair of the Australian Competition and Consumer Commission (ACCC)).

The board meets twice yearly with consumer protection officials from the Securities and Investment Commission (ASIC) and ACCC. It is responsible for accrediting and reaccrediting BNPL providers, data collection, general oversight, and fielding of consumer complaints. It is capable of imposing sanctions on members found to be non-compliant with guidelines. The committee published its first report in March 2022, acclaimed to be warmly received by industry representatives; it had met 18 times as of December of that year.

In a December 2022 submission to the Treasury Department, the committee commented on the need for enhancement of existing guidelines and oversight, stating that they believed the code must:

- Contain a clear definition of what does (and does not) constitute a BNPL product
- Be mandatory for all participants in the BNPL industry
- Contain meaningful penalties for breaches
- Be administered by, and enforceable by, a body empowered with the necessary authority under the code (such as ASIC or other appropriate entity)
- Contain the principal elements already contained in the voluntary Code (in particular, the hardship and dispute resolution provisions which the Committee has worked with Code member firms to entrench)
- Incorporate any other critical factors which the current review identifies as necessary.

==== Parliamentary response and regulatory oversight ====
In 2021, during the 46th Parliament, the coalition government launched the Parliamentary Joint Committee Inquiry into Mobile Payment and Digital Wallet Financial Services. In a summary of the inquiry's findings, they concluded that the government would adopt a 'wait-and-see' approach to the BNPL industry.

In 2024, at a speech in Melbourne, the Director of Payments Policy for the Reserve Bank of Australia (RBA) discussed the implications of a series of reforms in collaboration with the government to bring BNPL providers into the sphere of regulation. This came amid the stalling of a parliamentary motion which would bring providers under the scope of the Credit Act of 2009. Reforms to the Payment Systems (Regulation) Act (PSRA), under which the Reserve Bank's regulatory powers fall, would expand the definition of 'payment systems' and 'participants' in them to encompass BNPL services, allowing for broader oversight and regulation by both the RBA and government.

=== Indonesia ===
There exist numerous illicit BNPL providers ('pinjol') that are not registered with the Financial Services Authority (OJK). These services impose high interest rates and penalties, misuse personal credentials, and employ debt collectors to collect late payment, often under threat of violence to the obligate. Out of 16,231 complaints filed with OJK's Illegal Financial Activities Task Force in 2024, 15,162 were related to illegal pinjol.

The controversy surrounding pinjol platforms, aside from their illegal counterpart, is due to its ties to illicit online gambling. Users use the liquidity to finance their gambling addiction. To repay these loans and be eligible for more withdrawals (for revolving debt-style pinjol), desperate users have often sold their or their family's belongings, or even resorted to criminal activities. Circulating funds for illicit gambling increased 43% YoY in Q3 2025, reaching IDR 99.6 trillion. In an attempt to reduce the stigma and controversy, OJK renamed the platform from pinjol to the more formal, pindar (pinjaman daring). A policy involving freezing bank accounts that had been dormant for more than 3 months was proposed in May 2025, as an attempt to curb misallocation of funds and hacking. After public outcry, this policy was reversed and more than 28 million bank accounts were reopened. Campaigns have also been held by OJK and Bank Indonesia to raise awareness of the impact of late payments on a user's SLIK (credit score).

==== Philippines ====
The applicable regulatory framework for BNPL regulation in the Philippines is dependent upon the legal status and activities of the service provider. Under the Lending Company Regulation Act of 2007 (Republic Act No. 9474), lending companies are required to obtain operatory authority from the Filipino Securities and Exchange Commission (SEC). The act further requires lending companies to comply with the Truth in Lending Act (Republic Act No. 3765) and Consumer Act of the Philippines (Republic Act No. 7394) in relation to loan agreements, interest rates, charges, and consumer credit disclosures.

Financing companies are subject to regulation as defined by the Financing Company Act of 1998 (Republic Act No. 8556). The SEC supervises lending and financing companies, while the Bangko Sentral ng Pilipinas (BSP) exercises regulatory and supervisory authority over banks and other institutions within its jurisdiction.

The Financial Products and Services Consumer Protection Act (Republic Act No. 11765), enacted in 2022, applies to financial products and services, including credit and digital financial services. It recognizes the rights of financial consumers to fair treatment, disclosure and transparency, protection of personal information, protection against fraud and misuse of consumer assets, and timely handling of complaints. It also requires financial service providers to adopt appropriate product-design and delivery practices, including affordability and suitability assessments intended to help prevent over-indebtedness.

In July 2026, the SEC issued Memorandum Circular No. 20, series of 2026, prescribing prudential, disclosure, and market-conduct requirements for financing and lending companies and lifting the moratorium on online lending platforms. The circular forms part of the regulatory framework applicable to covered digital lending activities, including those that may be used to provide BNPL services.

=== New Zealand ===
Regulatory attention increased in the early 2020s as the sector expanded. In 2021 the Ministry of Business, Innovation and Employment began reviewing the BNPL market as part of a broader examination of consumer credit regulation. In 2023 the New Zealand government announced plans to bring BNPL providers under consumer credit legislation, including requirements for affordability assessments and lender responsibilities similar to those applied to other credit providers.

=== United Kingdom ===
On 2 February 2021, the British government announced its intention to bring interest-free BNPL products into the sphere of regulation. In 2022, the UK Financial Conduct Authority (FCA) published research warning that a significant proportion of BNPL users did not fully understand the terms of their borrowing and could be exposed to financial harm.

Proposals on regulating the UK's BNPL schemes were introduced by Emma Reynolds, then Economic Secretary to the Treasury, in May 2025. Her announcement noted that such schemes were useful tools for families "when used responsibly", but that consumers needed protection and better information.

=== United States ===
Prior to 2024, BNPL products were classified by the Consumer Financial Protection Bureau as "four-installment, no-interest consumer loan[s], typically with a down payment of 25 percent and the remaining three installments due in two-week intervals". This was prior to the imposition of any regulation of BNPL at the federal level.

==== State-level guidelines ====
===== California =====
California has thus far gone the farthest to regulate BNPL products, requiring that major providers adhere to state lending laws and obtain lending licenses. Importantly, not all BNPL providers in the state are covered by these guidelines. Fines and public settlements have been instituted against major providers who have failed to obtain licenses while operating in the state.

===== New York =====
In March 2024, the Buy Now, Pay Later Act was introduced in the New York State Assembly, following the earlier example set by California in an effort to bring BNPL providers into the sphere of regulation. Regulatory action would include:

(i) requiring BNPL lenders to obtain a license; (ii) prohibiting late fees, interest and certain other charges; and (iii) requiring BNPL lenders to make “a reasonable determination that [the] consumer has the ability to repay” the BNPL loan.

==== Federal regulation ====
===== FinCEN CIP protocol compliance =====
In 2024, the Treasury Department's Financial Crimes Enforcement Network (FinCEN) opened a request for comment by banks and other interested parties over the potential for the imposition of new partial Social Security number identification protocols for non-bank lending partners of banking institutions, in the interest of their maintaining compliance with the Customer Identification Program (CIP) under the Bank Secrecy Act of 1970 (BSA). Banks have not traditionally been required to obtain full Social Security number identification by customers applying for credit services at the point-of-sale in the interest of customer privacy and the easy facilitation of account creation within the bounds of existing banking norms and business practices. Rather, identifying information was relayed to third party information services (credit rating agencies, data aggregators, etc.) and full SSN identification would be provided for the individual in question prior to account creation.

Developments in the industry, particularly the increasing usage of BNPL services (non-bank lenders, those not personally subject to BSA protocols) by consumers, have led FinCEN to consider the need for the standardization of requirements for BNPL service providers. Specifically, FinCEN is considering whether BNPL providers should be covered under rules similar to those of traditional non-bank creditors/lenders (i.e. partial SSN identification) (given that they do not presently collect information in full compliance with the BSA), or be allowed to continue under existing methods of identity verification, which have thus far largely been successful in achieving their aims.

===== Consumer Financial Protection Bureau =====
It was announced in May 2024 that the Consumer Financial Protection Bureau would classify BNPL lenders (Similarly defined as they were previously as those offering repayment in four installments or less without a finance charge) as credit-card providers. Under the agency's interpretation, the administration of user transactions by certain BNPL providers involves 'digital user accounts', the issuance of that account implies the issuance of a credit-card like entity, and they are thus creditors. What results is as follows:

These BNPL providers are subject to Regulation Z’s open-end requirements under the Truth in Lending Act (TILA) which include requirements relating to account-opening disclosures, billing statements, changes in terms, payment processing, treatment of credit balances, issuance of cards, liability for unauthorized use, merchant disputes, billing disputes, crediting of returns, advertising, and, as the CFPB notes in a footnote, potentially application and solicitation disclosures.

The classification offered new protections to consumers such as the ability to dispute charges and obtain refunds, but did not cover several industry concerns previously raised by the agency. These included "ability to repay requirements, fees, and so-called 'data harvesting' by BNPL providers."

The CFPB has stated that it plans to provide a path for companies to gradually transition into adherence with the guidelines. The rule went into effect on June 30, 2024. Upon the beginning of the second Trump administration, the CFPB announced that it would not prioritize enforcing the ruling or regulatory guidelines.

Financial Technology Association v. Consumer Financial Protection Bureau et al.
- Court: United States District Court for the District of Columbia
- Full case name: Financial Technology Association, Plaintiff v. Consumer Financial Protection Bureau, and Rohit Chopra, in his official capacity as Director of the Consumer Financial Protection Bureau, Defendants
- Started: 2024-10-18
- Decided: Ongoing
- Docket nos.: No. 1:24-cv-2966

====== Court filings and legislation ======
The process by which this regulation was enacted has been challenged in court by the Financial Technology Association, which claims it represents an overreach of the agency's promulgating authority under the Administrative Procedure Act (APA). Suit was filed in federal court in October. In a statement, they claimed that 'pay-in-four' loans (the typical offering of the BNPL providers they represent, and the one that is principally targeted in the agency guidelines) already offered adequate security to users. Users, in their conception, already "benefit from strong consumer protections such as zero interest on outstanding balances, no compounding interest, and pausing accounts if consumers fall behind on payments to avoid an excessive debt burden.”

The CFPB has framed the new guidelines as an 'interpretive rule', meaning that they are not subject to the notice-and-comment period required under the APA. This, combined with the timing of the regulation, meant that the guidelines could not be lifted under the Congressional Review Act (CRA) were a shift in power to occur after the 2024 presidential election.

House Republicans sought to repeal the guideline in August 2024 under the CRA, but no motion occurred in the House and no subsequent action was taken in the Senate.

== Impacts on consumers ==
Buy now pay later mechanisms are believed by scholars to create what is known as the 'flypaper effect', which causes consumers with high access to liquidity to spend a larger portion of their total earnings on retail and consumer items. Research at Harvard Business School has found that consumers spend more with the option of BNPL installments than they would with a credit card. A survey done by the Financial Health Network in 2024 found that more than a third of consumers felt they spent more as a result of the availability of buy now pay later payment options. BNPL has been criticized for instilling a false sense of financial security in consumers, which could encourage impulse shopping and lead them to spend money they do not have.

In recent studies, marketing academics Syam Kumar and J.K. Nayak from the Indian Institute of Technology Roorkee found that consumers who are already in debt show a higher tendency to adopt buy-now-pay-later (BNPL) services. In a follow-up study, they further demonstrated that personality-related factors such as innovativeness, technological anxiety, and misconceptions about credit limits influence consumers’ choices toward BNPL adoption. Both studies highlight that impulse buying plays a crucial role in shaping consumers’ attitudes and intentions toward BNPL usage among online shoppers.

== Issues and criticisms ==
=== Normalizing debt ===
It is exceptionally easy to sign up for BNPL services, and their availability in a wide range of markets exposes them to a significant share of the consumer base. BNPL providers are significantly more likely than credit or banking services to approve lending applications. Most services do not review or require credit scores for new users; rather, they engage in 'soft credit-checks', which do not affect a potential clients' credit score (despite a user's credit score potentially being affected in the case of a late payment).

The convenience factor plays a critical role in driving consumer usage. A January 2025 report by the Consumer Financial Protection Bureau found that 63% of BNPL borrowers in 2022 had multiple outstanding loans at once, with roughly 20% of borrowers taking out at least one loan a month. Nearly two-thirds of all such loans in that year went to borrowers with sub-prime or deep sub-prime credit, and BNPL borrowers were more likely to have higher outstanding balances on other credit accounts/obligations. Usage has been described as addictive, with the Federal Reserve Bank of New York finding that almost anyone who had used the service was likely to use it again.

A 2024 Bankrate survey found that among those polled 56% of BNPL users had issues with overspending, missing a payment or regretting purchases. Influencer marketing of BNPL platforms on social media adds to the attractiveness of using BNPL credit to purchase items; influencers have been criticized for normalizing debt, marketing it as "fun", thereby encouraging overspending. The higher frequency of revolving debt among BNPL users is evidence of their using the service in a manner similar to that of traditional credit instruments. In 2023, LexisNexis reported that 75% of BNPL applicants had used the service more than once, with roughly a quarter using it 10 times or more. 'Super Users', those who had applied for BNPL services more than 20 times over a 15-month period, made up almost 10% of the BNPL userbase between 2020 and 2021.

Payment services, though, often provide flexible payment options for users, and most debt is interest-free (though rates, at their highest, can sit at nearly 30%). Long repayment periods, however, can obscure the real volume of the debt in the eyes of consumers. It can be maliciously enticing to low-income buyers, who might otherwise feel they don't have the funds necessary to make a major purchase, or young buyers, who may not fully understand the real price tag they're accepting. Its relatively straightforward point of access can cause consumers to unconsciously accept price figures that are potentially precluded by their immediate finances. Harvard Business professor Marco di Maggio described it as such:

'You see something you like, you put it in the shopping cart, and you start to checkout. Before, you were looking at $100 for the item, plus shipping, plus taxes. Now, the bill [for the first installment] says $25. You say, ‘OK, now I'm going to buy it for sure.’

If used intelligently, it can provide an option to consumers who may not have sufficient funds for upfront payment during an unexpected, costly event.

=== Unsustainable framework ===
==== Non-creditworthy customer base ====
A 2023 LexisNexis report questioned the assumption that BNPL users were largely credit invisible, and were turning to BNPL services as a last resort financing mechanism. A comparison between two large financial application datasets (Note: Analysis of two groups of 1 million US applicants for banking (credit, checking accounts, loans, etc.) and BNPL services between October 2020 and December 2021) found that banking applicants were 32% more likely to be credit invisible than BNPL users. In fact, BNPL applicants were 7% more likely than banking applicants to have a thick credit footprint. This, combined with the fact that a large portion of the user pool possesses subprime or deep subprime credit, (Note: 84% of BNPL applicants between 2020 and 2021, more than half possessed deep subprime credit - LexisNexis) has caused concern among numerous consumer and financial watchdogs, who have overwhelmingly sought to educate consumers on the potential risks to their credit and financial security.

A greater frequency of credit stress among BNPL users is evidence of such services providing an enticing alternative to consumers, who might not otherwise be able to access other crediting options. In the two years prior to applying for BNPL/credit, BNPL applicants were 72% more likely than traditional banking applicants to have multiple outstanding non-bank lending inquiries. 'Super Users', those who had applied for at least 20 loans over the course of a 15-month period, showed the highest rates of financial distress, with a significant minority of users possessing a measurably derogatory financial history. (Note: 10% of Super Users had a previous instance of Bankruptcy, 23% were or were previously lien holders, and 9% had been evicted from their home)

==== Increasing delinquency ====
In 2025, it was reported that consumers globally were failing to service their obligations on short-term debt, particularly BNPL loans. First quarter consumer credit losses at Klarna, a prominent service provider, had risen 17% from the previous year. Net losses had more than doubled, from $47 million to 99, and unpaid loans as a proportion of total credit stood at 0.54%, up from 0.51. Klarna stated that the first had resulted from an expansion of loan issuance, leading to a subsequent increase in the overall value of the company's non-serviced loans. Regardless, it has been questioned as a result of the expanding rate of delinquency on short-term loans. Given the fact that most services do not charge interest, profitability notwithstanding, any return at all is reliant upon the repayment of outstanding loans. The rate of delinquency thus has a direct and immediate impact on the companies' revenue forecasts.

LendingTree's 2025 survey found that roughly 41% of BNPL users had reported making a late payment in the past year, up from 34% a year earlier. 76% of those with a delinquency were only a week late in making their payment. Failure to make a payment normally results in the incurrence of a late fee, which can be high or low depending on the provider, and can stretch some consumers' finances thin and thus endanger their overall creditworthiness, or cause them to incur insurmountable debt.

The ease of use of these services is seen as both a short-term benefit and a potential long-term economic pitfall. The typical lack of any serious review of a persons' credit history provides an easy means of financing for non-creditworthy consumers who might otherwise be denied the funds needed to make major purchases. However, this means that the companies do not actually know, from all available evidence, whether or not those consumers are capable of servicing the debt they're obligated to repay.

By 2022, most BNLP services had failed to ever turn a profit. From 2023 onwards, Klarna's net losses have increased.

==== Predatory lending ====
Criticism has arisen against BNPL practices on account of their impact on debt accrual in low-income and financially vulnerable populations. Its use is significantly and disproportionately higher within these groups (Note: In the United States, those with an annual income between $20,001 and $50,000 - Consumer Financial Protection Bureau, 2022) and among women, Black, and Latino consumers.

Young consumers have reported not fully comprehending the size of the debts they'd incurred. Many have stated that the ease of access and registration encouraged prolific spending habits. In the United States in 2024, BNPL-linked debt accounted for 28% of unsecured credit obligations among 18-24 year-olds, compared with roughly 17% for other age groups. Low APRs and low or absent fees encourage applications by young and non-creditworthy consumers, who see it as an easy means of improving their credit, despite the lack of a clear and consistent reporting structure among providers.

==== Ability to repay and overextension ====
Many regulators and consumer watchdogs have expressed concern over the extensive, intensifying rate of "loan-stacking" among BNPL users. Overuse of these services can lead to sustained usage concerns, wherein consumers ultimately find it more difficult to service obligations on non-BNPL linked debt as a result of their overuse of the service. The American Consumer Financial Protection Bureau, though, has not found definitive proof that overuse of BNPL services significantly impacts consumers' ability to service other financial obligations, or "exacerbated [their] financial distress".

=== Harassment of obligates ===
Consumers in the UK have reported serious concerns over the use of debt collection agencies by BNPL providers. Representatives for the companies have responded that all contracted agencies are certified by the Financial Conduct Authority and affirmed that no in-person contact or bailiff is used to demand payment. Nevertheless, many consumers with outstanding balances have claimed that companies give little leeway, and that efforts by these agencies are incessant, and border on harassment.

=== Lack of regulatory oversight ===
Consumers that use BNPL are generally less protected by regulation, as compared to other financing options. The BNPL industry remains unregulated or self-regulated in many countries. Consumer protection measures vary greatly between providers, complicating claims by industry advocates that their terms of service offer adequate protection to customers. Dispute resolution channels often differ between providers, complicating efforts further.

Although BNPL payments are usually interest-free, financiers have been noted to report defaults more frequently than successful repayments to credit-rating agencies, potentially putting the credit rating of consumers in jeopardy. Checks conducted by financiers on credit bureau scores have also been critiqued for being scant. These checks are cursory, if conducted at all, and mainly evaluate income statements only.

=== Data privacy ===
BNPL services typically do not carry out hard credit checks on potential users, opting instead to perform a 'soft' credit check by reviewing their browsing history and spending habits. Though consumers agree to such validation as a contingency for use of the service, many companies continue to track user spending and shopping habits for marketing purposes even after their loan has been repaid. Some regulators have described this practice as predatory, marketing user data to merchants as a means of enticing consumers into purchases they might not otherwise make.

== Noted providers by country ==
=== Australia ===
- Afterpay
  - Money (WestPac)
- Brighte
- Flybuys
- Humm Group
- Payright
- Plenti
- Zip Co.

=== India ===
- Bajaj Finance
- Freecharge
- Lazypay
- Snapmint

=== Morocco ===
- Alya Pay

=== New Zealand ===
- Laybuy - Acquired by Klarna

=== Philippines ===
- Billease
- LazPayLater (Lazada)
- SPayLater (Shopee)

=== Sweden ===
- Klarna
  - Partners:
    - DoorDash

=== United States ===
- Affirm Holdings
- Apple Pay Later
- PayPal
- Perpay
- Sezzle
- Splitit (Founded in Israel, global headquarters since moved to Atlanta, GA)
- Quadpay - Acquired by Zip Co.

== See also ==
- Layaway
- Rent-to-own
- Debt
- Credit
- Payday loan
- Predatory lending
