= National Consumer Credit Protection Act 2009 =

The National Consumer Credit Protection Act 2009 (No. 134 (Cth)) (CP Act) is an Australian federal law, passed on 15 December 2009. It came into force on 1 April 2010.

== Responsible lending and unconscionable conduct ==
The act establishes a national regulatory framework for consumer credit, including obligations on lenders to engage in responsible lending practices. These obligations require lenders to assess whether a credit contract is unsuitable for a consumer, taking into account their financial situation and objectives.

The legislation also interacts with broader protections against unconscionable conduct under Australian law, particularly in circumstances where there is a significant imbalance in bargaining power between lenders and borrowers. Regulatory guidance and case law have examined the conduct of both traditional and non-bank lenders in situations where consumers may be placed in financially vulnerable positions.
