= Tipflation =

Phenomenon of increasing amounts and presence of gratuity in the US economy

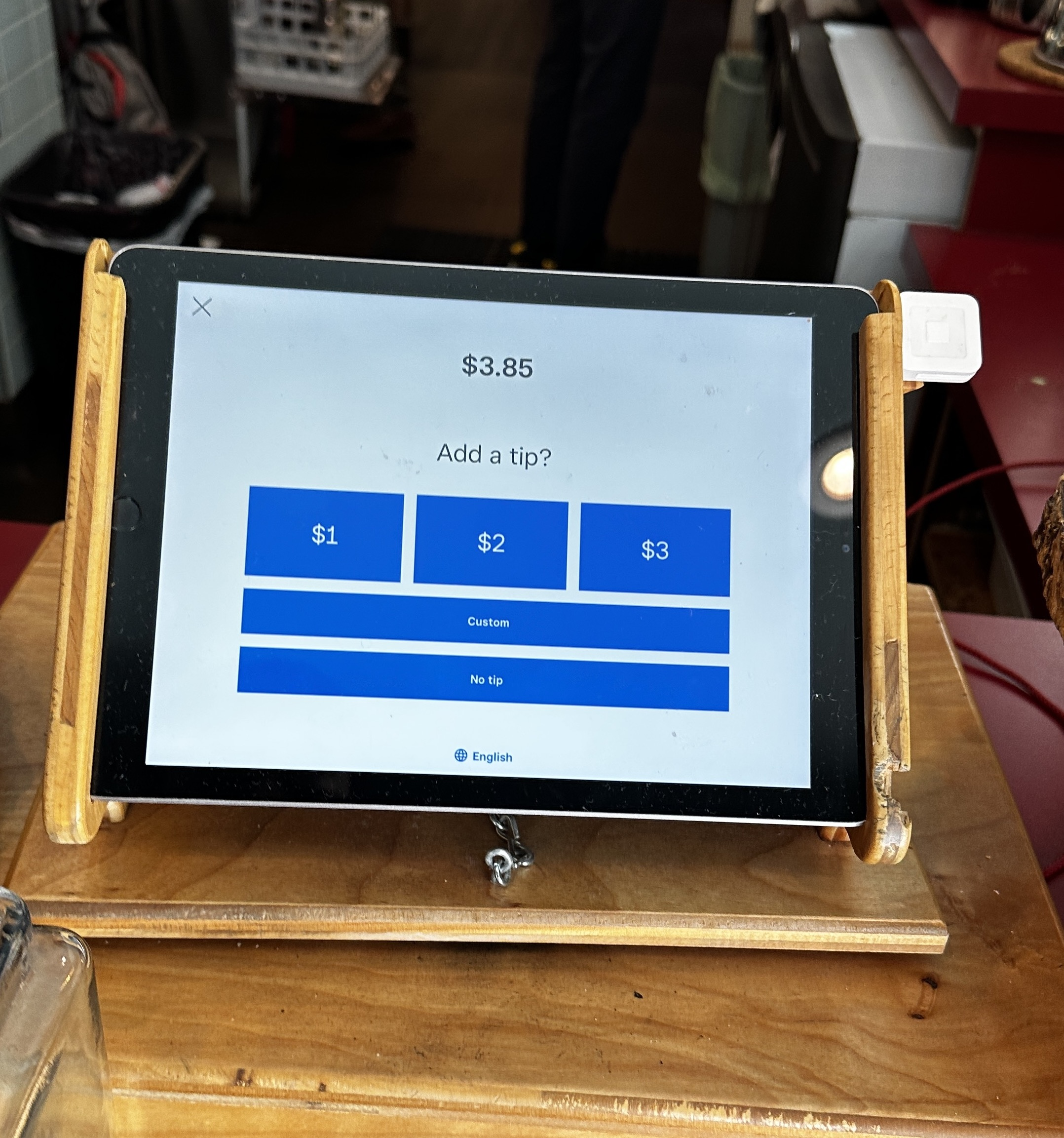
An "Add a tip" screen after paying for a US$3.85 coffee, with suggested gratuity amounts of $1 (26%), $2 (51.9%), and $3 (77.9%)

Tipflation and tip creep are terms to describe the United States' recent widespread expansion of gratuity to more industries, as opposed to being traditionally only prevalent in full-service restaurants. Tipflation's origins are likely the COVID-19 pandemic and the 2021–2023 inflation surge. Touch-screen digital payment systems run by companies like Clover and Square include gratuity prompts that are often visible to nearby members of the public and the service worker. The social pressure created from such systems is often separately mentioned as guilt-tipping, and tipflation has also been seen as causing tipping fatigue, which is the resentment that American consumers generally feel from tipping culture.

== Origins ==
=== COVID-19 pandemic ===
Tipflation is often said to have been incited during the COVID-19 pandemic, where in the United States, numerous measures introduced by federal and state officials such as stay-at-home orders forced the closure of many smaller businesses, especially restaurants. Customers have been noted during the pandemic to tip generously to smaller businesses and lower-wage workers.

=== Role of tech companies and social pressure ===
Tipflation further traces its origins to the increase of digital payment systems and the creation of digital tip jars. Many reports on the increased phenomenon of tipflation involves the technology developed by fintech firms such as Square (a subsidiary of Block), Toast, and Clover (a subsidiary of Fiserv), the three largest makers of digital tip software. All three companies manufacture integrated hardware and software services which not only have expanded the ability for small businesses to accept payments by card or contactless, but at the merchant's discretion come with prompts to add gratuity.

These systems, most frequently in the form of a tablet, can request a tip prior to receiving the full completion of a paid service. The format of the tablet also displays, either directly through the screen or through hand movement patterns, how much a person tips to not only the employee, but also everybody else waiting in line. Guilt-tipping is often coined to describe the social pressure that this situation creates. Etiquette researchers, such as Diane Gottsman, has phrased this phenomenon as consumers being "overwhelmed by the little piece of technology looking them in the face". An article from Vox also has raised concerns that tips collected through digital payment systems can also be subject to digital payment systems' fees as part of the overall revenue collected.

=== Starbucks labor unions ===
Starbucks in particular has been seen as a battleground for the changes in American tipping culture. As a concession to its baristas, who began to organize in 2022, the Seattle-based coffee company started to offer tips to its baristas within the app and at payment terminals. Customers who pay at the register are now required to either select a tip amount on a card processing device, or for mobile orders, can add tips later on. The tipping system implemented by the company and baristas places all tips within a single collection pot, divided up equally to all employees who currently work during the time that the tip is received. The new systems have been widely criticized by customers, slamming the system as "awkward", intrusive, and likewise to digital payment systems, being intrusive and severely increasing the social pressure to tip. Additionally, these credit card tipping benefits are only being provided to Starbucks stores which have not unionized, further dividing the company's baristas.

=== "New" tipping culture ===
The culture of tipping has been described as "radically different" and similar phrasing by American media outlets, beginning mostly in 2023. Previous customary tipping amounts have further been escalated, with 15% tips being exchanged in favor of occasionally 30% tips. Some occupations which are now widely requesting gratuities are ridesharing drivers like those for Uber and Lyft, food delivery drivers, and baristas at coffee shops.

=== Generational differences toward tipping ===
Beginning in the 1980s, the economy of the United States began to shift from a manufacturing based economy to a service economy. By 2021, the service sector contributed 77% of the nation's GDP. This change has resulted in younger generations entering service jobs at higher numbers compared to prior generations, contributing to differing views on tipping. Millennials on average leave larger tips at 26% or higher while Gen Z tips more frequently at 51% of the time compared to 42% for Baby Boomers and Gen X. With the average age of workers in the service industry being 29 years old, Millennials make up 49% of the service workforce while the National Restaurant Association estimates that 82% of Zoomers' first jobs are in restaurants. The tipping behavior among younger generations is believed to be due to their overrepresentation in service jobs compared to prior generations. Their understanding of the jobs and the challenges that workers face in these jobs prompts them to be more sympathetic toward workers and causes them to tip larger and more frequently than prior generations.

== Tipping fatigue and calls for reform ==
The rise of tipflation has been credited for widening the appeal of reforming tip culture, or abolishing it altogether. While journals, newspapers, and other media have previously published on abolishing tipping in the United States, such as a 2015 episode of the CollegeHumor series Adam Ruins Everything, tipflation is widely credited with popularizing the movement to a broader audience.

Numerous videos on TikTok in early 2023 have spread the idea and awareness of tipflation to an audience broader than ever before. Some videos showing people who claim to be landlords requesting tips have been highly criticized, while other videos have denounced the increase in tipping seen at quick-service restaurants and coffee shops, criticizing workers for only preparing and handing over a drink. Others have criticized the increase in both tips and extra charges, such as one instance where a video criticizes a drink shop where a tip is requested after the customer purchases a smoothie for $17 and $1.35 for an extra pack of stevia. Some response videos made by TikTok creators, themselves servers, have incited viewers to publish comments themselves reasserting the practice of optional tipping, arguing that bad service doesn't deserve gratuity. One video in particular reported on by CBS News expressed the request to tip on a worker simply pouring the customer a glass of water.

The causes of tipping fatigue have also been attributed to the remaining expectation that one should still provide a tip after numerous service charges levied by a service. Etiquette expert Thomas Farley has blasted restaurants for still asking customers for tips after numerous service were levied against them for various services and add-ons (such as to-go boxes), as well as the price increases in general costs due to the global inflation surge which started in 2021. Furthermore, a study from PlayUSA revealed that while 10% of customers are tipping more due to the pandemic, 17% are tipping less for the reason of inflation, and 60% of Americans wish to do away with tipping culture entirely. A similar study from Toast reported that the average gratuity rate for quick-service restaurants has dropped from 16.4% to 15.9%. It has been reported that several customers' 20% tips are not being seen as enough gratuity, further increasing outrage at new tipping culture. Some have expressed that gratuity outside of full-service restaurants should only be provided to workers "who go above and beyond".

Anti-tipping sentiments have continued to grow throughout 2023. A CNBC report published in early June cites statistics released by Bankrate showing that fewer Americans always leave a gratuity, including for dining at restaurants. Bankrate's statistics further show that nearly two out of every three Americans have a negative view on tipping.

== Response from tipped workers ==
Workers who receive tips have frequently stated that tips help them to survive as members of society, especially with regard to inflation. Some workers have also expressed difficulties sympathizing with people who are able to afford such goods but not provide gratuity.
