= Loyalty program =

Marketing strategy designed to encourage customers to continue to shop at a business

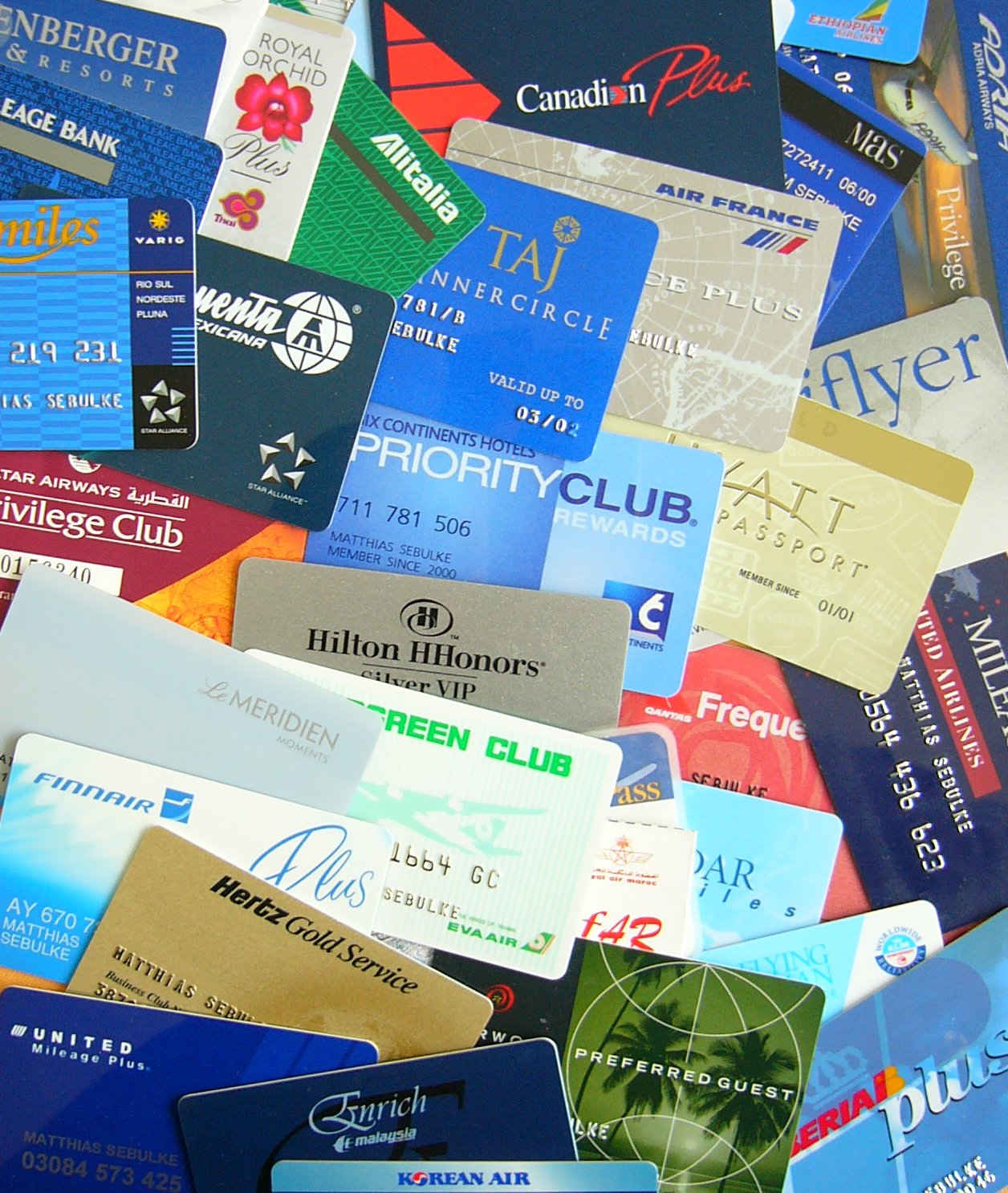
Various loyalty cards

A loyalty program or rewards program is a marketing strategy designed to encourage customers to continue to shop at or use the services of one or more businesses associated with the program.

== Single-company vs. coalition programs ==
Loyalty programs may be either:

- Single-brand programs, which may be for all stores owned by a company, such as Target, or branded stores which may be corporate-owned and franchised to independent business owners, such as McDonalds.
- Single-corporation programs, such as the joint Gap Inc. program, work at the stores and digital channels of Gap, Banana Republic, Old Navy, and Athleta, which are all owned by Gap Inc.
- Coalition loyalty programs provide benefits to customers of multiple otherwise-unrelated businesses. Examples include Rakuten Rewards which, in the U.S. offers cashback at more than 3,500 stores and Air Miles which awards points for purchases from multiple merchants in each market it serves (Canada, The Netherlands, Bahrain, Qatar, and the UAE).
  - Shopping center programs may also be based on a single or chain of shopping centers, such as the Tanger Outlets loyalty programs that can be used at merchants located at its outlet malls.
  - Downtown Olympia, Washington, launched a coalition loyalty program in 2021 for merchants in its downtown shopping district.

In 2020, McKinsey spoke of loyalty program "ecosystems".

== Features ==
=== How customers provide their account numbers ===
==== Physical loyalty cards ====
A loyalty program typically involves the operator of a particular program setting up a loyalty account for a customer of a business associated with the scheme, and then issues to the customer a loyalty card (variously called rewards card, points card, advantage card, club card, or some other name) which may be a plastic or paper card, visually similar to a credit card, that identifies the cardholder as a participant in the program. Cards may have a barcode or magstripe to more easily allow for scanning, although some are chip cards or proximity cards. U.S. supermarkets often issue two copies of the card: one credit-card sized and one that fits on a keychain, in addition to providing access to the card via a mobile app or website.

==== Digital loyalty cards ====
As of 2024, most programs in the United States offer a digital version of the loyalty card, accessed via a mobile app, and often customers can scan a QR or barcode from the app at the physical point of sale. Some programs no longer issue physical cards, or do so only as an exception, such as the Marks and Spencer's "Sparks" program. It launched in the UK In 2020 and issues physical cards only upon special request. American Airlines no longer sends membership kits to new members of its frequent-flyer program.

Encouraging or forcing customers to use a mobile app to present their loyalty account number, although criticized for being unfriendly to people without smartphones including many elderly people, benefits the merchant in a number of ways. It lets them present special offers to the customer (or even push them via push notifications), tailor customer experience to the individual consumer, and understand customer behavior better, including their purchasing amounts and patterns.

Similar developments have been observed in European markets, where digital loyalty programs are being adopted beyond large retail chains. A 2025 case study from Romania (among others) describes how mobile wallet-based loyalty cards enable independent businesses to build and manage customer relationships without maintaining a proprietary mobile app. These systems use QR codes for visit tracking, deliver automated rewards, and provide merchants with direct customer insights that are often unavailable when orders are placed through third-party delivery platforms. Their lower operational cost has contributed to broader uptake among small businesses.

==== Phone number and other methods ====
At a physical point of sale, presenting a physical or digital card is not necessary at many U.S. merchants, if the customer enters the phone number associated with the account on a terminal or tells it to a cashier who enters it into the register. When purchasing online, customers usually must log in to the account on the merchant's website. However, when purchasing airline tickets from online travel agencies, customers can usually enter their airline loyalty number into the agency website and the agency will pass it onto the airline.

=== Points ===
Programs that feature points grant customers a certain number of points for each purchase, in the US often per $1 or $10 increment of spend. Once they have enough points, clients can redeem them for either:

- merchandise or services free of charge
- discounts on merchandise or services
- gift cards, credit vouchers, etc. to spend with the merchant
- "cashback", either:
  - money that the program transfers to the customer's account or
  - a paper check that the program mails to the customer

=== Tiers ===
Programs with tiers define levels (such as silver, gold, and platinum levels) that customers are upgraded to when they spend enough with the merchant(s), usually over a certain period of time such as a year. For example, Sephora gives 1 point for $1 spent. Once customers earn a specific number of points, they can enter a new level with higher discounts and exclusive products.

=== Membership fees ===
In subscription-based programs, customers pay a fee to enjoy the program's benefits, for example Barnes and Noble bookstores charge members about 40 U.S. dollars per year (as of mid-2024) for its "Premium Membership and Rewards" program, which gives members a 10% discount off most merchandise. There is also a free tier which does not offer such discounts but does allow members to collect virtual "stamps" (i.e. loyalty points).

== Types of rewards ==
Depending on the program, rewards may take the form of:

- merchandise or services free of charge
- discounts on merchandise or services
- gift cards, credit vouchers, etc. to spend with the merchant
- cashback

In addition to rewards, loyalty cards may also be used to identify consumers for benefits and other services, e.g.:

- when pharmacies dispense prescriptions
- for access to an airport lounge (using a frequent-flyer card)
- when customers presented checks for payment at a point-of sale

=== Cashback ===
Programs with cashback features give customers a portion of the money that they have spent with a business (usually a defined percent which may be higher than usual during promotions). The "cash back" is rarely actually cash money, but rather takes the form of a transfer of the "cashback" amount to the customer's bank account.

Examples in the U.S. include Rakuten Rewards, a coalition reward program, and many banks that give their clients cash back for using their debit cards to pay for various products and services.

== Channels ==
Depending on the program, ways that consumers may access their loyalty account (account number, promotions, other information) may include:

- Desktop, mobile, and/or responsive versions of the website(s) for the program and/or of participating merchant(s)
- Mobile apps for the program or participating merchant(s)
- At dedicated kiosks, such as in casinos
- Traditional methods such as:
  - Physical membership cards
  - Paper-based mailings of account statements, promotions, and other information

=== Mobile apps and websites ===
There has been a move away from traditional magnetic card, stamp, or punchcard based schemes to online and mobile online loyalty programs. While these schemes vary, the common element is a push toward eradication of a traditional card, in favour of an electronic equivalent. The choice of medium is often a QR code. Some prominent examples are Austrian based mobile-pocket established in 2009, the US-based Punchd (discontinued from June 2013,), which became part of Google in 2011. and an Australian-based loyalty card application called Stamp Me which incorporates iBeacon technology. Others, like Loopy Loyalty (HK), Loyalli (UK), Perka (US), and Whisqr Loyalty (CA), have offered similar programs. Passbook by Apple is the first attempt to standardize the format of mobile loyalty cards.

=== Offline with mobile device ===
With the introduction of host card emulation (HCE) and near-field communication (NFC) technology for mobile applications, traditional contactless smart cards for prepaid and loyalty programs are emulated in a smartphone. Google Wallet adopted these technologies for mobile off-line payment applications.

The major advantage of off-line over the online system is that the user's smartphone does not have to be online, and the transaction is fast. In addition, multiple emulated cards can be stored in a smartphone to support multi-merchant loyalty programs. Consequently, the user does not need to carry many physical cards anymore.

== Industries ==
Today, such loyalty programs cover most types of commerce, each having varying features and rewards schemes, and range from programs of a single-location business to large chains or membership in a coalition loyalty program. Industries include:

- Retail: Supermarkets, department stores, clothing stores, beauty stores and other specialty shops
- Travel and Hospitality: Airlines, passenger railways, hotels, car rental and carshare companies
- Food and Beverage: Restaurants, coffee shops, fast-food chains
- Financial Services: Banks, credit card companies
- Telecommunications: Mobile service providers, internet service providers
- Entertainment: Cinemas, streaming services, theme parks, casinos
- E-commerce sites/apps and online marketplaces
- Fitness and Wellness: Gyms, fitness studios, spas etc.
- Automotive: Car dealerships and service centers

The market approach has shifted from product-centric to a customer-centric one due to a highly competitive market and a wide array of services offered to customers, therefore, it's important that marketing strategies prioritize growing a sustainable business and increasing customer satisfaction.

=== Casinos ===
Almost all major U.S. casino chains also have loyalty cards, which offer members tier credits, reward credits, comps, and other perks based on card members' "theo" from gambling, various demographic data, and spend patterns on various purchases at the casino, within the casino network, and with the casino's partners. Examples of such programs include Caesars Rewards (formerly called Total Rewards) and MGM Resorts International's Mlife.

=== Coffee shops ===
==== "Disloyalty" cards ====
As of 2011, some independent coffee shops in Boston, Toronto and London has set up experimental "disloyalty card" programs, which rewarded customers for visiting a variety of coffee shops.

== Benefits to merchants ==
Loyalty programs' most important benefit to merchants is that they generate data, which bring more repeat business and therefore increase sales.

Application forms for cards usually entail agreements by the store concerning customer privacy, typically non-disclosure (by the store) of non-aggregate data about customers. The store uses aggregate data internally (and sometimes externally) as part of its marketing research. Over time the data can reveal, for example, a given customer's favorite brand of beer, or whether they are a vegetarian.

As of the mid-2020s, loyalty program trends include:

- the integration of AI and data analytics into loyalty platforms in order to personalize customer experiences,
- focusing on emotional connections, and
- offering personalized rewards that resonate with individual consumer preferences
- omnichannel experience to drive more interaction i.e. access across multiple physical and digital touchpoints such as in-store, via mail, e-mail, mobile apps, push notifications from the app or via SMS, websites, etc.

Loyalty programs are a means of implementing a type of what economists call a two-part tariff.

== Loyalty programs by country ==
Below are some of the loyalty programs operating across various countries.

=== Africa ===
- South Africa: Consumer research in 2026 showed at least 23 active, major loyalty programs in South Africa. The use of loyalty cards in store and online has for many years been integrated into the shopping process for many South Africans, and the research found that the number of cards per customer increased as household income increased. The grocery sector is the most popular for the use of loyalty programs, followed by the banking sector. Some programs are linked across major companies, such as banks, gas stations, and supermarket chains. The most valued loyalty card across all sectors was supermarket Shoprite Group's Xtra Savings card. This was followed by the same card used at sister supermarket chain Checkers, and then by Pick n Pay's Smart Shopper card. Other popular cards include FNB eBucks and Discovery Vitality in the commercial banking sector, Clicks ClubCard in the pharmacy sector, TFG Rewards in the clothing sector, Vodacom Vodabucks in the mobile telephony sector, and Shell V+ and Sasol Rewards in the fuel sector.

=== Asia ===
- Japan: see ja:共通ポイント and ja:ポイントプログラム#日本における歴史. In Japan, non credit card multi-brand points who awarded in addition to each store's own points are becoming more common. Most Japanese people say Big 4 of multi-brand points are V-POINT(ja)(SMCC(affiliated SMBC Group) and CCC)(merged T-POINT(ja)(CCC) on 22 April 2024), Ponta(ja)(affiliated Mitsubishi Corporation), Rakuten point(ja), d Point Club(ja)(NTT Docomo). Other famous point bland are WAON(AEON Group(ja), JRE POINT(ja)(JR East), PayPay point(SoftBank Group's QR code payment), Nanaco.
- Hong Kong: Octopus Rewards, MTR Corporation. Different chain stores under common ownership often share the same loyalty program, such as A.S. Watson Group's MoneyBack, which can be used at Parknshop, Watsons, and Fortress stores, as well as the corporation's retail partners. HKT's The club also offers a similar loyalty program. Flag airline carrier Cathay Pacific operates Asia Miles, a loyalty and frequent-flyer program.
- India: PAYBACK India is India's largest coalition loyalty program. German loyalty program operator Loyalty Partner took a controlling interest in i-mint in June 2010 and renamed the program PAYBACK India in July 2011. BPCL's PetroBonus fuel card program has 2 million members. Indian Oil's fleet card program XTRAPOWER and retail program XTRAREWARDS claim a combined customer base of 3 million.
- Iran: The first Iranian loyalty program launched in 1996. East Credit Card Group Kish launched its loyalty program in 2005.
- Malaysia: Genting Highlands Resort loyalty card, WorldCard, is valid in three countries: Malaysia, Singapore and Hong Kong.
- Philippines: SM Supermalls and BDO Unibank offer rewards cards which are accepted by The SM Store, SM Supermarket, SM Hypermarket, and Philipppine operations of Uniqlo, Alfamart, Miniso, Crate & Barrel, The Body Shop, Dyson, Forever21, Innisfree, ECCO, ACE Hardware and Watsons Pharmacy. Robinsons Malls also offers a loyalty program through the Go Rewards app (formerly known as the Robinsons Rewards card). Others are Jollibee, (HappyPlus card), Grab Rewards, and Mercury Drug's Suki Card.
- Singapore: Loyalty programs in Singapore include GrabRewards by Grab, SAFRA and Plus! from NTUC.
- China: Loyalty programs in China include China Railway Loyalty Programme.

=== Europe ===
- Austria: The two largest loyalty programs in Austria are Payback and mo. JÖ was fully launched in 2019.
- Finland: The two major retail coalitions with loyalty programs are the S-Group with their S-Etukortti card) and Kesko with K-Plussa (67%).
- Georgia: Georgia's biggest loyalty card program has been run by Universal Card Corporation since 2010 via UNICARD.
- Germany: The largest loyalty program is Payback, launched in 2000. HappyDigits and the Shell ClubSmart program are next in size. DeutschlandCard was launched by Arvato in 2008. HappyDigits was disbanded by 2010.
- Hungary: SuperShop and Multipoint are their main loyalty programs.
- Italy: After the exit of Nectar from the market in 2015, Payback is the most popular loyalty program. Supermarkets Esselunga, Coop and Il Gigante also have loyalty programs.
- Latvia: One of the largest loyalty programs in Latvia which is working as an operator for many merchants is Pins. Another is Walmoo
- Norway: The largest Norwegian loyalty program is Trumf. Trumf is a "brick and mortar" loyalty program owned by NorgesGruppen, a grocery wholesaling group in Norway. KickBack.no is one of the largest online loyalty programs and cashback sites in Norway. KickBack.no is owned by Schibsted Media Group.
- Republic of Ireland: Superquinn introduced its SuperClub loyalty card in 1993, the prototype for Europe. However, loyalty cards did not expand until 1997, when Tesco Ireland introduced its Clubcard scheme, shortly after its purchase of Power Supermarkets. SuperValu introduced their own loyalty club called Real Rewards. Others were:
  - During the late 1990s—Esso petrol program were: Tiger Miles, Maxol, Texaco and Statoil. Increasing oil prices ended these in 2005.
  - Game, a major computer game and hardware retailer, which merged with Electronics Boutique's programme.
  - Rewards From Us To You, a hotel loyalty program
- Romania: Cardora, launched in 2025, provides app-free digital loyalty cards using Apple and Google Wallet and enables cross-business partnerships.
- Russia: MALINA, "the largest multicorporate customer loyalty program in Russia," was launched in 2006 by Loyalty Partners Vostok. Another is Mnogo.ru.
- Switzerland: Loyalty programs are popular in Switzerland, with the two main supermarket chains, Migros and Coop prominent. The M-Cumulus card can be used at the Migros supermarkets, Ex Libris, SportXX, and other retailers. The Coop Supercard earns points on purchases at Coop and a variety of other associated stores. Other stores such as Interio, a furniture retailer, are also joining the market with loyalty cards and store-based incentivized credit cards. The only coalition loyalty scheme in Switzerland is Bonus Card with a network of over 300 independent retail partners. In recent years, online loyalty programs have also started to target the Swiss. First to make an offering in Switzerland was German-based Webmiles. Claiming to be Switzerland's first online bonus program, Bonuspoints was launched in early 2008 and offers incentives for shopping at 70 different online stores.
- Turkey: Pegasus Airlines has a loyalty program called Pegasus Plus which gives rewards for every flight. Passengers can spend reward points as a discount without waiting to cover a full flight. Turkish Airlines has a loyalty program called Miles&Smiles.
- United Kingdom: Passcard (later renamed Passkey) was in the early 1980s. Sainsbury's Homebase Spend and Save Card was another early 1980s loyalty card. A later program, Tesco's ClubCard, was criticized for not offering value for money. The Economist suggested that the real benefit of loyalty cards to UK outlets is the massive marketing research database potential they offer. Morrisons is another program. Many stores have kiosks that, with the cards, print vouchers that can be used at the till.
  Safeway's ABC Card was discontinued in 2000. Maximiles is an online coalition program.
  Formerly operated by British Airways, Airmiles was rebranded in 2011 from Airmiles to Avios, with changes that caused members to pay taxes and fees on flights they used for redemption. Co-operative Membership: the Co-op Group offers a 2% (previously 5%) refund to members on Co-op branded products with 2% also going to the cardholder's nominated charity. This is only available in Co-op Group stores. It replaced the dividend benefit previously used. Other Co-op chains continue with the dividend scheme, e.g. Midcounties Co-operative. Many of these accept other Co-operative loyalty cards but generally without the same benefits. For instance Midcounties Co-operative accept Co-operative Group cards but there is no charity donation or cardholder refund.

=== The Americas ===
- Brazil
  - Dotz is a coalition loyalty program in Brazil with over 50 million members
- Canada
  - Aeroplan, a coalition program centered on Air Canada with Apple, Sephora, Uber also participating
  - Air Miles is Canada's largest loyalty program.
  - Canadian Tire's Canadian Tire money is the oldest loyalty program in Canada.
  - The food and beverage industry also has several companies with rewards programs such as Tim Hortons' Tim's Rewards
  - Scene+, a coalition program with participants include Cineplex-owned cinemas, Scotiabank (for spending using its cards), Sobeys grocery stores, Home Hardware, Expedia, Recipe restaurants and Rakuten Rewards.
- United States: In the US, loyalty cards have a long history. Some are only online. Some partner with classic credit cards. Frequent-flyer programs and, less commonly SeaMiles co-exist with programs that donate a percentage of sales to a designated charity. Some American retailers either have not implemented these cards, or eliminated them, in favor of discounts for all shoppers. Few states regulate club cards. As an example, supermarkets in California are subject to the Supermarket Club Card Disclosure Act of 1999.
  - Coalition programs include Plenti
- Mexico:
  - Aeroméxico Rewards, formerly Club Premier, a coalition program with participation of Aeromexico airlines and multiple otherwise unrelated retail chains
  - Monedero Naranja (lit. "Orange Wallet"), in which Comercial Mexicana's various supermarket brands La Comer, Fresko and City Market, participate

=== Oceania ===
Flybuys is the largest loyalty program in both Australia and New Zealand.

- Australia: Contenders include Woolworths' Everyday Rewards, Myer's MYER one program, the Priceline's Sister Club, Amcal Rewards, Miller's Fashion Club, and the BB Retail Capital Pulse Rewards program.
- New Zealand: Other programs include the New Zealand Automobile Association AA Smartfuel programme and Countdown supermarket's Onecard. Kachingo was a short-lived "card free" programme.

== As virtual currency ==
Loyalty programs have been described as a form of centralized virtual currency, one with unidirectional cash flow, since reward points can be exchanged into a good or service but not into cash.

== Criticism ==
Evidence for the effectiveness of loyalty programs is controversial. Many companies are unsure whether and how to use customer loyalty programs profitably. Many programs (regardless of location, size, or industry) are run without the appropriate metrics or target parameters.

Some companies complain that loyalty programs discount goods to people who are buying goods anyway. Moreover, the expense of participating in these programs rarely generates a good return on investment. The Forte Consultancy Group regards loyalty programs as bribes. In the case of infrequent spenders, loyalty fees provide a means of subsidizing discounts.

A 2015 study found that most supermarket loyalty cards in the United States do not offer any real value to their customers. Furthermore, commercial use of customers' personal data – collected as part of loyalty programs – has the potential for abuse; it is highly likely that consumer purchases are tracked and used for marketing research to increase the efficiency of marketing and advertising, which is one of the purposes of offering the loyalty card. For some customers, participating in a loyalty program (even with a fake or anonymous card) funds activities that violate privacy. Consumers have also expressed concern about the integration of RFID technology into loyalty-card systems.

One may view loyalty and credit-card reward-plans as modern-day examples of kickbacks. Employees who need to buy something (such as an airline flight or a hotel room) for a business trip, but who have discretion to decide which airline or hotel chain to use, have an incentive to choose the payment method that provides the most cash-back, credit-card rewards or loyalty points instead of minimizing costs for their employer.

== See also ==
- Geomarketing
- Identity management
- Incentive
- Incentive program
- Loyalty marketing
- Premium (marketing), e.g., "premiums"
- S&H Green Stamps
- Trading stamp
- Sunk cost
