= Tip jar =

Containers used for collecting gratuities

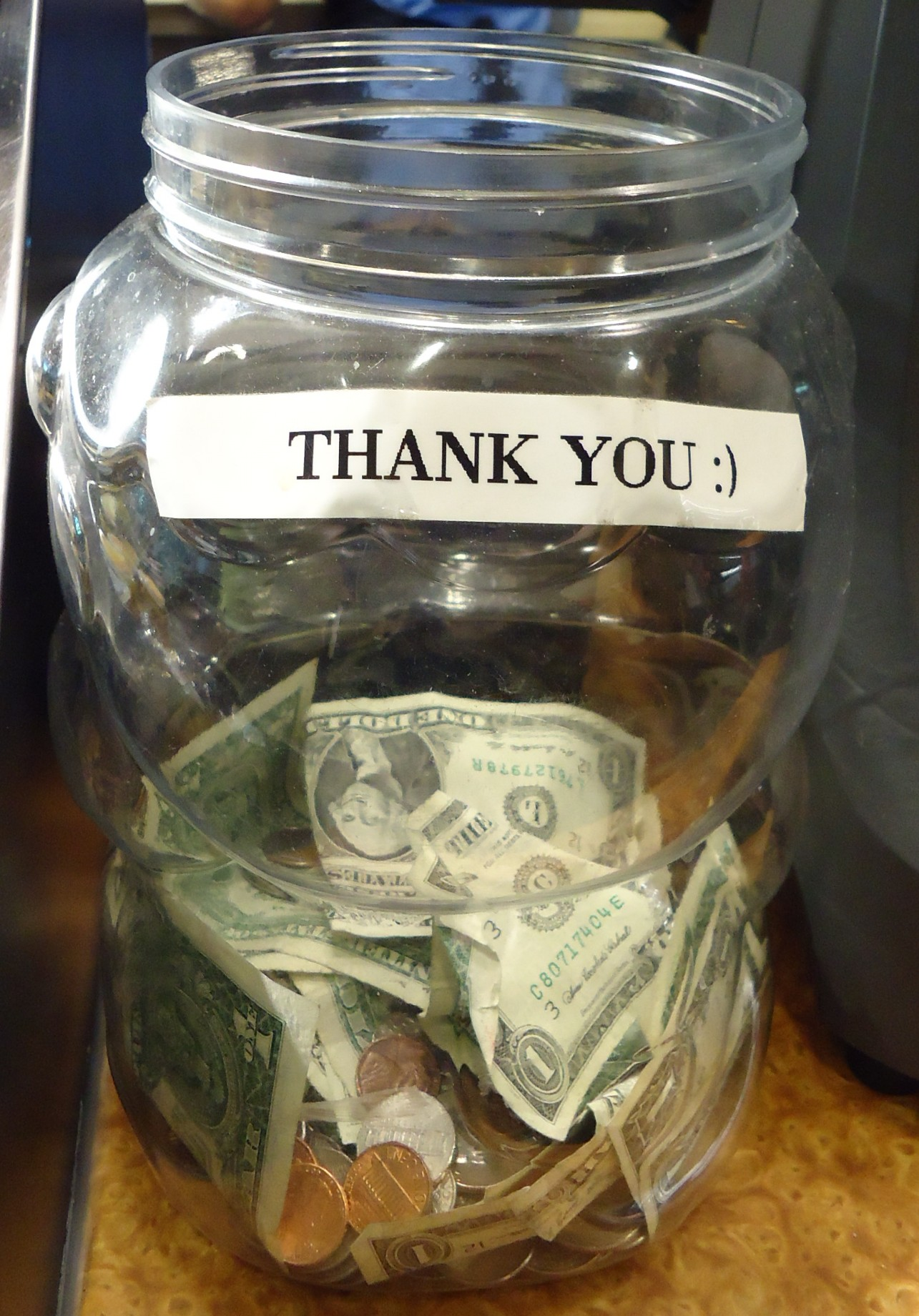
A tip jar in a New Jersey restaurant

A tip jar (also known as a tip cup) is a container, commonly a glass jar, into which customers can put a gratuity. A tip jar is usually situated at the point-of-sale at many businesses. Although common in many countries around the world, tip jars in food and drink establishments are ubiquitous in the United States.

The tip jar has become a source of controversy. Customers may feel discouraged from patronizing establishments using them. They may also feel that tip jars are inappropriate at certain types of establishments such as movie-theater concession counters, dry cleaners, take-out restaurants, gym locker rooms or grocery bagger's work stations. Many feel social pressure to use them, or that they are paying too high a total price when purchasing a simple item.

== History ==
The tip jar may have originated hundreds of years ago. A 1946 editorial in Life claimed that English taverns used prominently displayed urns for tips that were labelled 'To Insure Promptitude'. However, there is no historical evidence to support this.

== Proceeds ==
Usually, the accumulated tips are divided among all of the workers during the shift. In one case, a court case resulted when supervisors and assistant managers claimed that they were entitled to a share at a Starbucks coffee outlet in New York.

== At piano bars ==
A pianist at a piano bar may earn tips from a tip jar to supplementing the normally small salary. This may be a basket, jar, or oversized brandy snifter placed on or near the piano. Tips may be given by customers who have been played a song that was requested by being written on a napkin.

== Digital tip jar ==
This allows customers to swipe their credit card in a simulated tip jar. The card reader is set to charge a certain amount, normally one dollar. Customer wishing to tip more can swipe the card numerous times.

Payment kiosks operated with software and hardware from companies like Square also act as a digital tip jar, encouraging people to click a tip button. However, Square has been criticized in the past for encouraging customers to leave gratuity out of guilt. These "tip screens" have also been blamed for accelerating tipflation in the United States.

== See also ==
- Mandatory tipping
- Tipflation
