= Ticketing and Reservation System =

Chinese railway ticketing software

Ticketing and Reservation System (TRS)
- The login screen of TRS v5.0.
- Other names: 铁路客票发售和预订系统
- Developer: China Academy of Railway Sciences
- Initial release: 1996
- Written in: PowerBuilder, Sybase SQL Server
- Operating system: Microsoft Windows
- Platform: IA-32
- Available in: Simplified Chinese
- Type: Computer reservation system
- License: Proprietary, not available to public
- Website: www.rails.cn

The main screen of TRS v5.0.

Ticketing and Reservation System (TRS, 铁路客票发售和预订系统) is software used for rail ticketing in China Railways. It was developed by the China Academy of Railway Sciences. The first release was in 1996. As of December 2009, the version in use was version 5.2. It was named SMART before (excluding) version 4.0. It runs on Microsoft Windows.

The TRS client is designed to be operated entirely using the keyboard for maximum efficiency.

== Features ==
The TRS client can perform many operations related to the sale of China Railway tickets, including but not limited to:

- Selling tickets by cash, by electronic payment methods such as Weixin Pay, Alipay and debit cards, or by points collected in the China Railway Loyalty Programme. After selecting the desired tickets, the cashier can enter the amount of cash given into the text box at the bottom of the screen or press Ctrl+4 to bring up the electronic payment screen to complete payment.
- Changing tickets (Chinese: 改签; pinyin: gǎi qiān).
- Searching for available tickets and connecting trips.
- Printing a Trip Information Reminders (Chinese: 行程信息提示; pinyin: Xíngchéng xìnxī tíshì) slip for a trip.
- Printing tickets/reimbursement slips for tickets purchased online. An order number may need to be provided, which is 10 characters long and starts with the letter 'E'. Reimbursement slips cannot be printed for tickets bought using points. This function is referred to as "contract ticket" (Chinese: 合同制票; pinyin: Hétóng zhì piào) in the TRS client.
- Printing reimbursement slips for change or cancel fees.
- Collecting user information (Chinese: 用户信息预采集; pinyin: Yònghù xìnxī yù cǎijí).

A demonstration of using a simulated version of TRS to sell a ticket between Beijing West and Zhengzhou station. The unique GUI can be operated entirely using the keyboard. (Note: This screenshot comes from a simulator and not the actual TRS software.)

== Peripherals ==
TRS requires several peripherals to provide its full functionality.

=== Ticket printer ===
Computers with TRS are equipped with a ticket printer, which allows the printing of tickets (now termed reimbursement slips, as tickets are now electronic). Most ticket printers are designed for blue tickets equipped with a magnetic stripe (although the magnetic stripe was formerly used across the national high-speed railway network in automatic faregates, it is now only used on the Jinshan Railway in Shanghai), while some are designed for pink paper-only tickets, with the latter type becoming increasingly rare.

=== Receipt printer ===
A thermal receipt printer is also connected to the computer, which prints receipts and Trip Information Reminders slips on a roll of white thermal receipt paper.

=== RFID card reader ===
An RFID card reader is used to read Resident Identity Cards, Residence Permits for Hong Kong, Macao, and Taiwan Residents, and Foreign Permanent Resident ID Cards.

=== Student discount card reader ===
A separate RFID reader is used to read student discount cards placed as a sticker in university student ID certificate booklets. These cards entitle the holder to discounted trips from the city of their university to their home city 4 times a year while they are a student.

=== Customer confirmation terminal ===
A device with a green "confirm" button and a red "cancel" button (marked in Chinese) may be provided to the customer, requiring them to perform an action to confirm or cancel a transaction.

== Network ==
The TRS client must be connected to China Railway's intranet to function. Authorized third-party ticket offices located outside train stations also have the TRS client and the necessary peripherals to sell tickets. These retailers use a VPN to connect to China Railway's intranet, allowing them to use TRS, and will charge customers a 5 yuan service fee per ticket. However, online booking platforms such as Trip.com do not have direct access to TRS or China Railway's intranet and are not authorized by China Railway to sell tickets. Despite their false claims that they can acquire tickets faster when tickets are sold out, they simply use web scraping to place orders on the official 12306 online booking platform using the customer's username and password (as China Railway does not provide a public API for purchasing tickets) or cooperate with the aforementioned authorized third-party ticket offices to buy tickets.

== See also ==
- Computer reservation system
- MARS (ticket reservation system), Japan's railway ticket reservation system
- Amtrak Arrow Reservation System, the United States' railway ticket reservation system
