= Stratex =

Stratex or variation, may refer to:

- StratEX, an HR/payroll software company, a subsidiary of Toast, Inc.
- Harris Stratex Networks, formerly Stratex Networks, a microwave networking company
- StratEx, a record-setting high altitude skydive at 136 kfeet / 41.4 km up made by Alan Eustace
- Stratex Institute, a marketing consultancy and training firm located in Barcelona
