= Gyft =

Gyft may refer to:

- Gyft (app), a gift card mobile app and website
- Gyft (rapper)
- Gyfts (app), a holistic health and wellness website
