= Soren Iverson =

American web designer

- Occupation: Web designer
- Known for: Satirical app production
- Website: soreniverson.com

Soren Iverson is an American web designer best known for his satirical app product mockups, which he describes as "unhinged".

== Career ==
During his high school years, Iverson had designed band graphics for his friends.

Iverson received a bachelor's degree in fine arts from Biola University. He has worked for Envoy, Square and Cash App, as a web designer. He also has done freelance work since 2013.

Iverson has designed numerous sites in his career. In an interview with Lovers Magazine he listed the logo and website of the air-conditioning company Kapsul, as well as the online checkout for Square as two of his favorite designs.

Iverson first started to upload satirical designs in 2022. He was inspired by Spotify Wrapped, a marketing campaign that summarizes the top musicians and songs Spotify users have listened to in a year. In December 2022, he uploaded mockups of what equivalents of Wrapped for Google Maps, Robinhood and Starbucks would look like. After some of his posts went viral, Soren decided to upload designs daily. One of his earliest viral post was of a IPhone alarm that woke up the entire family.

Iverson has also created a subscription that allows paying subscribers to see additional designs. He self-published Can you Imagine, a book that collects several of his designs.

One of Iverson's designs, an app that would allow you to summarize long LinkedIn posts, was created as an actual extension.

In 2024, Iverson published an app for iOS called Stompers. The app is a step counting racing game where the users have the ability to interfere with one another's steps comedically.

== Personal life ==
Soren Iverson plays bass in his free time for the local bands of King Shelter and Fight Scene. He lives in Costa Mesa, California.
