= Sezzle =

American financial technology company

- Company type: Public
- Website type: Financial technology
- Traded as: Nasdaq: SEZL; S&P 600 component
- Founded: 2016; 10 years ago
- Key people: Charlie Youakim (CEO); Paul Paradis (President); Emmanuel Isaac (co-founder); Mia Peroff (co-founder); Rishi Mukherjee (co-founder); Killian Brackey (co-founder)
- Industry: Financial technology
- Website: sezzle.com
- Users: ▲3.1 million (June 2021)
- Current status: Active
- Native clients on: Android; iOS; Windows

Sezzle is a publicly traded financial technology company headquartered in Minneapolis, Minnesota, with operations in the United States and Canada. The company provides an alternative payment platform offering interest-free installment plans at selected online stores. As of June 2021, the Sezzle platform had over 10 million user sign-ups and over 48,000 participating merchants.

== History ==
Sezzle was founded in 2016, by Charlie Youakim, who had previously led Passport Parking, Paul Paradis, Killian Brackey, Emmanuel Isaac, Mia Peroff, and Rishi Mukherjee in Minneapolis. Sezzle raised over US$17 million in equity capital prior to its IPO, where it raised an additional US$30 million. The company also has a US$100 million debt facility from Bastion capital.

Sezzle's initial product was next-business-day ACH payments and a cashback reward system, later iterated changing to a “buy now, pay later” model in 2017. Sezzle launched its product to the United States in August 2017. It raised US$9.1 million in mid-2018, and gained a US$100 million debt financing from Bastion Capital Corporation by the end of the year. At that time, it hired former US Bank executive Karen Hartje as its chief financial officer and former Target and TD Bank executive Jamie Kirkpatrick as its chief risk officer.

In April 2019, Sezzle raised US$5.7 million, partnered with Bank of America Merchant Services to implement their digital card processing solution within the payment platform, and expanded to Canada a few months later, opening its headquarters in Toronto, Ontario. Sezzle listed on the Australian Securities Exchange at AU$1.22 a share on 30 July 2019 and raised US$30 million. In December 2019, it gained a US$100 million line of credit.

In February 2020, Sezzle announced that it topped 1 million active customers.

On 1 June 2020, Sezzle reincorporated as a Public Benefit Corporation, making Sezzle the first “buy now, pay later” corporation with such a status. Later that summer, the company raised US$55 million from its equity in the ASX, and hired former PayPal executive Veronica Katz as its chief revenue officer, while Paradis became the company's first president.

On 6 August 2020, Sezzle CEO Charlie Youakim said the company is testing its service offering in India, with an expected launch at the end of the year. The move would mark its first major expansion outside the US and Canadian marketplaces.

In 2021, it was revealed that Sezzle had begun operating in the Brazilian market. Also in that same year, US major retailer Target Corporation announced that it had chosen Sezzle as it preferred "Buy Now, Pay Later" partner making it the first top 5 US retailer to partner with a BNPL provider. Also in 2021, Sezzle CEO Charlie Youakim was selected by Worth Magazine as one its distinguished "100 Most Worthy" list for his work to financially empowering young consumers across the world.

In February 2022, Sezzle entered into a binding agreement to be acquired by Australian-owned Zip Co by way of statutory merger, implying Sezzle's value at A$491 million at the time of announcement.

In July 2022, Sezzle and Zip mutually agreed to terminate their previously announced merger agreement for the proposed acquisition of Sezzle by Zip. As part of the mutual termination, Sezzle will receive from Zip U.S. $11 million, to cover, among other things, Sezzle’s legal, accounting, and other costs associated with the transaction.

On June 9, 2025, Sezzle sued Shopify, alleging in a federal lawsuit that Shopify's e-commerce marketplace damaged its business and violated antitrust laws.

== Platform ==
The Sezzle e-commerce payment platform enables customers of participating online stores to split the payment for their purchases into four installments. The first installment is paid at the moment of purchase while the other three are due at regular intervals over the following six weeks.

Instead of relying solely on a customer's FICO score for credit risk evaluation, Sezzle's underwriting system assesses each order individually and takes into account multiple factors including a soft credit score check, the customer's order history with Sezzle, and the total purchase amount. The customer's credit score is not impacted. Repeat customers who have paid off previous purchases on time are allowed to finance the purchase of more expensive products.

The platform operates as an alternative payment method that the customer selects at checkout to enable payment with participating retailers. Users can also shop and find stores through the Sezzle app and website.

== California lending license ==
On 30 December 2019, the company introduced a "buy now and pay later" service in California to its customers, but the California Department of Business Oversight ruled that the company must instead make loans to its customers. The California Department of Business Oversight stated that Sezzle's involvement with the merchants goes "beyond non-lending relationship yet permitted by California courts, and the credit sales purportedly purchased by Sezzle do not justify Sezzle’s extensive involvement."

On January 17, 2020, the California Department of Business Oversight officially approved Sezzle's application for a lending license to operate within the state of California.

== Controversies ==
Sezzle has been the subject of various controversies concerning its business practices, lending model, and regulatory compliance.

=== Lending Practices and Risk Management ===
Critics, including short-selling firm Hindenburg Research, have alleged that Sezzle's business model relies on making high-risk loans to subprime consumers who may have difficulty accessing traditional credit. A key concern is the cost of capital; as of 2024, the company reported borrowing at an effective interest rate of 12.65% to fund its loan portfolio.

Financial analyses have pointed to deteriorating credit quality. In 2024, Hindenburg Research reported that while Sezzle's loan book grew by only 6% year-over-year, its provision for credit losses grew by 130%, suggesting a rapid issuance of lower-quality loans. Sezzle's Head of Risk was reported to have no apparent prior corporate experience before joining Sezzle, having been a teaching specialist at a university.

=== Insider transactions ===
Significant insider selling and financial transactions have drawn scrutiny. In 2024, Hindenburg Research reported that insiders had sold approximately $71 million in stock during the year . A key pre-IPO investor, Continental Investment Partners, was reported to have reduced its stake by 87%. Additionally, a margin loan taken by CEO and Chairman Charlie Youakim was disclosed. The loan was collateralized by 1.72 million shares, representing roughly 30% of the company's total shares outstanding, a detail found in a footnote to a 2024 proxy statement.

=== Business and Consumer Practices ===
Sezzle has faced allegations of problematic business practices, particularly regarding its subscription services.

- Merchant Base Decline: The company's own disclosures show a 51% decline in active merchants since 2021, falling to 23,000 by the third quarter of 2024. An independent review alleged the actual number of merchants listed on its website was even lower, at just 6,776. Several previously announced merchant partnerships, including with Target, appear to have been quietly discontinued.
- Subscription Enrollment: The company has been accused of enrolling users into recurring monthly subscriptions without their clear knowledge, a practice highlighted in user complaints and the company's own FAQ.
- Customer Complaints: The Better Business Bureau (BBB) database showed Sezzle had received hundreds of complaints, with a 1.1-star average rating based on reviews over a three-year period. In contrast, the company has also received positive customer service reviews on other platforms like Trustpilot.

=== Regulatory and Ethical Concerns ===
Sezzle has faced scrutiny for its partnerships with online Canadian pharmacies. A report from The Bear Cave alleged that Sezzle is a leading payment platform for several online pharmacies that are on the National Association of Boards of Pharmacy's "Not Recommended List" and are classified as "rogue" or "unapproved" by LegitScript, a payments compliance company. These pharmacies have been accused of illegally shipping prescription drugs, often from countries like India, to U.S. consumers, sometimes without requiring a valid prescription. Consumer complaints detailed situations where chargebacks for non-delivery of drugs from these pharmacies led to Sezzle threatening to send the users to collections for non-payment.
