= Perka =

Clover Rewards
- Company type: Private
- Website type: Loyalty marketing
- Available in: English
- Headquarters: Portland, Oregon and New York City, United States
- Area served: Worldwide
- Founders: Alan Chung, Robert Bethge, Robert Coury, Joe Stelmach, Jay Harlow
- Employees: 60
- Launched: April 2011

Clover Rewards (formerly Perka) is a digital loyalty marketing platform that was launched in April 2011. An alternative to traditional paper and plastic card-based incentive programs, Clover Rewards provides interactive loyalty marketing solutions for businesses. The technology that Clover Rewards is built upon works on mobile phones via app or SMS (text messaging) and allows merchants to reward customers for frequent purchases. Clover Rewards also serves as a direct-marketing platform and analytics tool. Clover Rewards fits into the category of mobile loyalty, a modern type of loyalty program. In summer 2018, Perka was rebranded to Clover, its sister company.

The company is headquartered in Portland, Oregon, and in New York City.

== Market position ==
In 2013, Perka was listed in Fast Company's Top 10 Most Innovative Companies in the local category. Expansion both domestically and internationally - including Canada, the U.K., Latin America, Australia and Africa - has registered Perka as a notable company in digital marketing. With the introduction of enterprise features in mid-2013, including a full API, Perka integrates with national brands such as Virbac’s More Smiles Program, regional brands such as The Melt, and more than 1,000 other businesses. First Data, the global payment processing company, acquired Perka in October 2013. Perka now operates as an autonomous subsidiary and is run by the same executives and product-development team as when the company was founded.

A major difference from other loyalty software relates to what actions can earn customers rewards. Some offer rewards for visiting a store - without the requirement of making a purchase - while others, including Perka, reward customers only when a purchase is validated at the point of sale. Originally designed primarily for coffee shops with a "buy 10 get 1 free" model similar to Starbucks' rewards program which is one of the most prominent digital loyalty programs in the US, Perka has since expanded and now offers a flexible points-based version that is geared toward more diverse types of businesses.

== Founders ==
CEO Alan Chung is a serial entrepreneur with twenty years of experience creating software companies. Chung was formerly the CEO of Zenbe, a web-based email suite which was acquired by Facebook in 2010. Prior to Zenbe, Chung founded iAmaze, an early web application development tool which was acquired by AOL in 2006. Before that, he co-founded Lighthouse Design which was acquired by Sun Microsystems in 1996.

Other founding partners include Robert Bethge, Rob Coury, Jay Harlow and Joe Stelmach.
