= Scott Scheirman =

- Born: Scott Thomas Scheirman; October 9, 1962 (age 63); Greeley, Colorado, United States
- Education: University of Northern Colorado
- Occupations: Chief Financial Officer, Chief Executive Officer, Community Leader
- Known for: Chief Financial Officer of Western Union (2006-2013)

Scott Scheirman (October 9, 1962) is an American business executive, financial professional and community leader. Scheirman served for seven years as the Executive Vice President & Chief Financial Officer of Western Union (2006-2013) and has held a variety of executive leadership and senior financial leadership roles at a variety of companies.

== Early life and education ==
Scott Scheirman was born in born Greeley, Colorado on October 9, 1962. He obtained a bachelor's degree in Business Administration with an emphasis in Accounting from the University of Northern Colorado – Magna Cum Laude class of 1985. He became a Certified Public Accountant (CPA) in 1986 and held an active CPA licensee through 2015.

Scheirman remains active with the University of Northern Colorado community, including serving as a member of the university foundation's Board of Directors.

== Career ==
Scott Scheirman began his career at Ernst & Young in 1985.

He joined American Express/First Data Corporation, then Western Union's parent company, in 1992. While at First Data Corporation, Scheirman served in many senior business and financial roles and ultimately became the Senior Vice President and CFO of First Data Corporation Payment Services.

After participating in Western Union's successful IPO/spin-off from First Data Corporation, Scheirman became the CFO of Western Union in 2006. During his tenure, he helped guide Western Union through the various economic cycles, and sat on the Western Union Foundation Board. Scheirman left the company in 2014. While serving as Western Union's CFO, Scheirman was listed at number 110 on AdvisoryCloud's Top CFOs of 2014.

After leaving Western Union in 2014, Scheirman leads JKL Ventures LLC, a business and investment advisory firm he co-founded.

== Other positions ==
He also works on educational projects and not-for-profits for youth and is a member of the Board of Directors for the Denver Scholarship Foundation and the Boy Scouts of America Denver Metro Council.
