= Unicard =

Loyalty program

Unicard

UNICARD is a loyalty card scheme run by Universal Card Corporation. It is the most popular loyalty card in Georgia. First UNICARD was issued in 2010; Collection of loyalty points was available in more than 100 partner companies combining more than 500 leading trading points. Since 2016 more than 250 companies joined UNICARD network. Partner companies participating in UNICARD loyalty card program reward their customers every time card holders make a purchase.

== History ==
Universal Card Corporation was founded in 2009. First UNICARD was issued on April 7, 2010. Since 2011 UNICARD became available not only in Tbilisi (capital of Georgia) but in other Georgian regions.

In accordance with data from year 2015, in 5 years Universal Card Corporation distributed totally 1 600 000 UNICARDs and expanded its partnership network by unifying more than 200 companies in its loyalty card scheme.

Universal Card Corporation launched its first mobile application in 2015. It is available for iPhone and Android system operation smartphones. Application was created to make loyalty card more mobile and easy to use. User gets virtual card, which makes point collection and redemption more entertaining. App shows locations where UNICARD point collection is available. Mobile application helps UNICARD holders to track personal transactions, get virtual card immediately, collect and redeem points by using virtual card; redeem points into desirable gifts; find where to collect points; receive news and special offers.

Since 2016 Universal Card Corporation loyalty card scheme counts approximately 250 companies and therefore UNICARD network unifies about 4000 leading trading points.

== Collection ==
Collection

UNICARD holders receive bonus points on purchases made at retailers offering loyalty card scheme program provided by Universal Card Corporation.

Bonus points collection scheme varies and depends on several parameters: a) sum spent on purchase b) bonus point's rate in the particular retailer. For instance, supermarket chain SMART rewards UNICARD holders with 1.5 bonus points on each spent 10 GEL. Moreover, companies from UNICARD network periodically launch campaigns and hot offers giving UNICARD holders possibility to collect more points by meeting particular requirements.

Bonus points on UNICARD could be collected while purchasing food, goods, garments/clothing, fuel, travel packages, tickets, pharmacy, GYM passes or other services. UNICARD symbol at retailers points that company offers Universal Corporation Card loyalty card scheme. UNICARD points could be collected faster in case holders share card with their relatives, maximum 5 cards could be linked to one single UNICARD account, whereas one card is principal and others are supplementary.

== Redemption ==
Bonus points collected within the Universal Card Corporation loyalty card scheme are subject to redemption. UNICARD holders can redeem their bonus points on any products presented within the particular partner's stores where redemption is available. For instance, currently this service is valid at Supermarket chain SMART, Ioli, Foodmart and SPAR.

Bonus points collected on UNICARD could be redeemed online via website where catalogue includes more than 1 500 items, whether it is a gifts or services. Customer willing to redeem their points could find via online catalogue: travel packages, jewelry, perfumes, make up, talk time on cell phone, fuel vouchers, utility payments, accessories, vouchers, appliances, toys, books, magazines, stationery and many more.

== Products ==
Unideposit

In January 2016 Universal Card Corporation launched ─ entirely new option to accumulate more bonus points even if you spend the same. Unicard principal card holders now will be able to get more benefit, acquire and spend additional bonus points immediately as deposit expires.

Unimania

In April 2016 Universal Card Corporation launched new product – www.unimania.ge online space for point's collection. Unimania rewards UNICARD holders who visit web page, watch TV adverts and banners, click on URLs to visit advertiser's pages and answer questions by participating in questionnaires as respondents.

Any company can publish its media content on Unimania and reward Unicard customers for interaction.

== Service Centers ==
Service center

Universal Card Corporation head office resides in Tbilisi, capital of Georgia, 0186, 71 Vazha-Pshavela Ave.

UNICARD holders can apply to the Service centers located in:

- Tbilisi, 71 Vazha-Pshavela Ave. (Saburtalo area)
- Kutaisi, 67 I. Chavchavadze Ave. (Grand Mall area)
- Batumi, 5 I. Chavchavadze (Batumi Plaza, III floor)
- Marneuli, 26 Maisi Street, (Smart Supermarket area)
- Akhaltsikhe, 1 Mikheil Tamarashvili Street (Smart Supermarket area)

== See also ==
- Official Webpage
- List of companies from loyalty card scheme network
- Where to redeem bonus points
