= Popmoney =

Person-to-person payments service

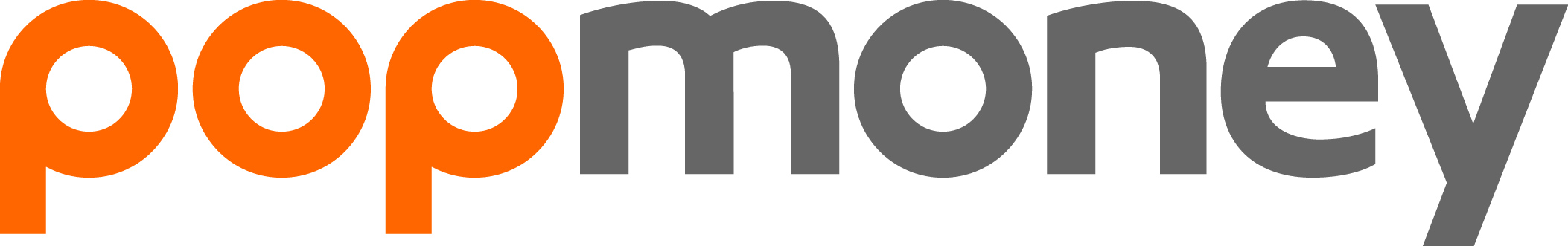
- Company type: Division of Fiserv
- Website type: Online payment system
- Headquarters: New York, New York, {{{location_country}}}
- Founder: Sanjeev Dheer
- Website: www.popmoney.com

Popmoney was a person-to-person payments service (P2P) developed by CashEdge (now part of Fiserv) and launched in December 2010.

The service enabled individuals to send and receive payments electronically in a manner that is designed to displace traditional check payments. In 2018, some banks began to replace Popmoney with Zelle. Fiserv discontinued the service on June 30, 2023, stating that the majority of its customers had already transitioned to Zelle.

The name "Popmoney" is an acronym for "pay other people money".

== Function ==
Popmoney differed from other person-to-person payment services in the manner that transactions took place. Popmoney transactions executed from the sender's checking account to the receiver's checking account directly; there was no requirement for a stored-value account for either participant.

Transactions executed through popmoney.com cost $1.00 each. Generally, transactions took 1–3 days, but in April 2013 real-time payments were enabled in certain circumstances.

== Integration with Zashpay ==
Fiserv's acquisition of CashEdge necessitated integration between Fiserv's Zashpay P2P service and Popmoney. Prior to acquisition, Zashpay had more than 1,400 financial institutions signed up. Popmoney retained fewer financial institutions, but those that it did were significantly larger.

== Bank integrations ==
As of February 2012, Popmoney had enabled single sign-on capability with over 1,400 financial institutions.

== Criticism ==
In 2012, Consumerist criticized Popmoney because not all types of bank accounts could receive payments from Popmoney. Additionally, Popmoney made it difficult for a user to close their account. Users were allowed to create accounts online, but per the terms of service were required to send account closure requests via postal mail in order to terminate their account.
