= VisionPLUS =

Financial software application

VisionPLUS is a financial software application from First Data Corporation. Originally developed by the Paysys Research and Development Group, this application is mainly used for credit card transaction processing by banks and transaction processing companies, storing and processing credit card, debit card, prepaid, closed end loan accounts and similar financial transactions such as Visa, MasterCard, American Express, Europay, and private label transactions against those accounts. More than 600 million cards around the world are processed on different versions of this application software.

== Modules ==
VisionPLUS consists of various modules that work together to manage the life cycle of accounts. VisionPLUS allows financial institutions to configure their own product features and functionality.

=== The main functional modules of VisionPLUS include ===
* Credit Decision Management       (CDM)   - Credit application processing and account opening
* Credit Management System         (CMS)   - Account credit processing module, which also handles debit and prepaid card accounts. 
* Collections Tracking Analysis    (CTA)   - Delinquent accounts collections and tracking module 
* Account Services Management      (ASM)   - Customer services module
* Financial Authorisation System   (FAS)   - Financial transactions authorizations module 
* Letters tracking System          (LTS)   - Letter generation module 
* Security Sub System              (SSC)   - Common Routines System (formerly Security Sub-System)
* World Wide Security System       (WSS)   - User Access Management
* Interchange Tracking System      (ITS)   - Dispute tracking module 
* Transaction Management System    (TRAMS) - Front-end processor for batched transactions
* Merchant BankCard System         (MBS)   - Merchant acquiring system
* VisionPLUS Messaging eXchange    (VMx)   - XML messaging gateway to VisionPLUS
* Hierarchy Company System         (HCS)   – Supports commercial card products with deep hierarchies
* Loyalty Management System        (LMS)   - Managing of loyalty programs based on transactional activity and account events
* EMV Scripting System             (ESS)   - Rules engine based EMV script management
* Key Management System            (KMS)   - Cryptography key management for magnetic and EMV chip cards
* Offer Management System          (OMS)   - Marketing Campaign management for account holders

CMS is the core module and plays an important part, as all account-related activities are posted in the CMS module.

VisionPLUS Software was introduced by Paysys International Inc. in 1996. In 2001, First Data Corporation acquired Paysys and since then VisionPLUS has been marketed by FirstData in Europe and elsewhere.

=== Versions ===
- 1981 PaySys International, founded as Credit Card Software, Inc., (CCS)
- 1982 CCS shipped its first product, CardPac. Its main market was the bankcard industry (Visa and MasterCard transaction processing only).
- 1988 Vision21 was released for the private label card market by CCS International
- 1991 VisionPLUS for both private label and bankcard market by CCS International
- 1995 CCS changed its name to PaySys International, Inc.
- 1998 VisionPLUS 2.5 was released by PaySys
- 2000 VisionPLUS 8.0 was released
- 2001 First Data acquires VisionPLUS from PaySys International
- 2006 VisionPLUS 8.01 was released by First Data
- 2007 VisionPLUS 8.15 was released by First Data
- 2008 VisionPLUS 8.17 was released by First Data
- 2011 First Data lays off the majority of its U.S.-based VisionPLUS developers. Development and maintenance is sent offshore to Singapore and India.
- 2013 VisionPLUS 8.44 was released by First Data

Due to software feature upgrades and compliance mandates from payments schemes like Visa, MasterCard, American Express, and JCB, First Data releases updates twice a year. There are also incremental functional releases and brand new products (modules) released from time to time. These are referred to as VisionPLUS 8.nn (where nn stands for a number between 01 and 99).
