= Bank of America Merchant Services =

Defunct merchant services company

- Company type: Joint venture
- Industry: Merchant services
- Founded: 2009; 17 years ago
- Defunct: June 2020
- Parent: Bank of America, First Data
- Website: merch.bankofamerica.com

Bank of America Merchant Services was a merchant services company owned by partners Bank of America and Fiserv. It was among the largest payment processing companies in the United States based on card-transaction volume.

Bank of America Merchant Services was created by Bank of America and First Data in 2009. Bank of America Merchant Services manages sales and customer service and First Data handled the transaction processing. In 2013, the company was the largest U.S. merchant acquirer by Visa and Mastercard volume, processing $517 billion in payments.

The company expanded into Europe in 2016 and operates locations in the United States, Canada, and Europe.

Bank of America ended this joint venture with Fiserv in 2020 and established its own independent Merchant Services platform.
