= Mandatory gratuity =

Automatically added to a customer's bill

A mandatory gratuity (also known as mandatory tipping or an autograt) is a tip which is added automatically to the customer's bill, without the customer determining the amount or being asked. It may be implemented in several ways, such as applying a fixed percentage to all customer's bills, or to large groups, or on a customer-by-customer basis. Economists have varied opinions on the issue of mandatory tipping. Arguments against mandatory tipping include higher food price at the restaurant to make up for wages and loss of control of dining experience.

== General discussion ==
Some bars in New York City's borough of Manhattan have instituted mandatory tipping. Mandatory tipping is considered an oxymoron, as tipping is by definition a voluntary act on the part of the customer. The BBC has reported that some find the practice bothersome; particularly those who are not aware that the tipping is used to subsidize the sub-standard pay at the workplace.

Mandatory tipping and voluntary tipping are illegal in some cases: Australian casino employees, and US government employees, for example. Tipping is not generally part of Japanese culture, and can be confusing or offensive. Tipping in China is frowned upon, except for those living in the semi-westernized regions of Hong Kong and Macau.

Restaurant customers who pay the food portion of their bill but not the mandatory gratuity have at times been arrested, but charges are generally dropped.

Some cruise lines charge their patrons $10/day in mandatory tipping; this does not include extra gratuities for alcoholic beverages.

In her 2005 book Miss Manners' Guide to Excruciatingly Correct Behavior, Judith Martin opines that fast food restaurants will never charge mandatory tipping for their customers, despite the presence of tip jars, and considers tipping for non-table services to be inappropriate.

Ian Ayres, Fredrick E. Vars & Nasser Zakariya published a paper suggesting that tipping contributed to racial prejudice, since ethnic minorities would often be less able to pay a large tip. Another paper by Yoram Margalioth of Tel Aviv University argued that there was a negative externality associated with tipping, and that the practice facilitated tax evasion. Two other American studies have contributed to the thesis that tipping is racially discriminatory, finding that ethnic minority servers and taxi drivers received lower tips on average than their white counterparts, by both white and minority customers. In the study of the servers, an attempt by the author to isolate other possible contributing factors, such as poor service, found that "After controlling for these other variables … the server race effect is comparable across customer race."

== Labour laws ==
=== Australia ===
According to the Australian Taxation Office, tips not paid voluntarily are considered service charges, and are thus consideration for the supply by the restaurateur, meaning they are subject to taxation.

=== Canada ===
According to the Canada Revenue Agency, auto-gratuities and any tip pools controlled and distributed by the employer are legally subject to income tax and other mandatory deductions (such as Canada Pension Plan or Employment Insurance) before being paid to the employees. All other gratuities are deemed direct tips and it is the employee's responsibility to declare them as taxable income when filing for income tax.

=== France ===
According to legislation passed by the Government of France, all tips, whether mandatory or voluntary, are not subject to any form of taxation or other deductions, throughout 2022 and 2023. Pursuant to the definitions laid out in Article L3244-1 of Chapter IV (which pertains to tips) of the French labour code, the law (specifically, Article 5 of Law 2021-1900), passed on December 30, 2021, overrides earlier guidance from the Ministry of Economics, Finance and Industrial and Digital Sovereignty on fees for services rendered (i.e., mandatory tips/levies), which had been summarized as being taxable.

=== Ireland ===
On January 24, 2022, the Payment of Wages (Amendment) (Tips and Gratuities) Bill 2022 was initiated by Senator Regina Doherty on behalf of the then Tánaiste and Minister for Enterprise, Trade and Employment, Leo Varadkar. The Bill was then passed by Seanad Éireann on June 29, 2022, and signed by the President of Ireland, Michael D. Higgins, as the Payment of Wages (Amendment) (Tips and Gratuities) Act 2022 on July 20, 2022.

The Act, which took effect on December 1, 2022, describes a charge (including a mandatory charge) imposed on a customer as a "service charge" and states that the employer shall treat all payments, whether made by an electronic mode of payment or any other means, received from customers pursuant to such a charge as if any such payment was a tip or gratuity received by an electronic mode of payment, insofar as distribution amongst employees is concerned. Notwithstanding, one of the purposes of the Bill is to place tips and gratuities, but not mandatory service charges, outside the scope of a person's contractual wages, and it does so by amending the Payment of Wages Act, 1991 to explicitly preclude tips and gratuities from being regarded as wages, while still allowing for deductions such as taxation as required by or under the Act, by any other statute or by any instrument made under any statute. This is consistent with the guideline prescribed by the Revenue Commissioners that service charges are liable at the second reduced rate of taxation (as with other restaurant services), while voluntary tips or gratuities remain outside the scope of VAT.

The Act also describes new guidelines to which employers must adhere, insofar as clearly displaying their policy on tips and service charges is concerned.

=== Mexico ===
According to the Tax Administration Service, all gratuities count as wage income, and are thus taxable.

=== United Kingdom ===
According to HM Revenue and Customs, if an employer imposes a mandatory service charge and the money is paid out to their employees, National Insurance contributions are always due on the payments no matter what the arrangements are for sharing out the money.

=== United States ===
According to the Internal Revenue Service, auto-gratuities do not constitute tips as they are service charges. Characterized as non-tip wages, they are subject to social security tax, Medicare tax, and federal income tax withholding.
