= First Data =

American payments company

First Data Corporation
- Type: Subsidiary
- Traded as: NYSE: FDC
- Industry: Financial services
- Founded: 1971; 55 years ago, in Omaha, Nebraska, U.S.
- Founder: Perry E. "Bill" Esping
- Defunct: 29 July 2019
- Fate: Acquired by Fiserv
- Headquarters: Atlanta, Georgia, U.S.
- Key people: Frank Bisignano (CEO); Himanshu A. Patel (CFO)
- Products: Merchant services
- Revenue: ▲US$ 12.05 billion (2017)
- Operating income: ▲US$ 1.71 billion (2017)
- Net income: ▲US$ 1.47 billion (2017)
- Total assets: ▲US$ 48.27 billion (2017)
- Total equity: ▲US$ 6.01 billion (2017)
- Number of employees: 22,000 (2017)
- Parent: Fiserv
- Website: FirstData.com

First Data Corporation was an American financial services company headquartered in Atlanta, Georgia, United States. The company's STAR Network provided nationwide domestic debit acceptance at more than 2 million retail POS, ATM, and at online outlets for nearly a third of all U.S. debit cards.

First Data had six million merchants, as of 2014 the largest in the payments industry. The company handles 45% of all US credit and debit transactions, including handling prepaid gift card processing for many US brands such as Starbucks. It processed around 2,800 transactions per second and $2.2 trillion in card transactions annually, with an 80% market share in gas and groceries in 2014. First Data's SpendTrend Report is frequently used by national news networks such as WSJ, USA Today, ESPN, The New York Times, Vox Media, and Bloomberg.

In January 2019, Fiserv announced to acquire First Data in an all-stock deal with equity value of $22 billion and completed the acquisition in July 2019.

== History ==
In 1969, the Mid-America Bankcard Association (MABA) was formed in Omaha, Nebraska, as a non-profit bankcard processing cooperative. First Data Resources (FDR) was founded in Omaha, Nebraska in June 1971 by Perry "Bill" Esping, along with Mike Liddy and Jack Weekly. It started off by providing processing services to the Mid-America Bankcard Association (MABA). In 1976, First Data became the first processor of Visa and MasterCard bank-issued credit cards. In 1980, American Express Information Services Corporation (ISC) bought 80% of First Data. The remaining 20% was purchased in 5% increments each subsequent year until June 1983. First Data Corporation was incorporated on April 7, 1989. In July 1991, First Data purchased Signet Ltd, the operator of the Access in United Kingdom from its owners NatWest, Midland Bank, Lloyds Bank and Royal Bank of Scotland.

First Data Corporation was spun off from American Express and went public in 1992. In 1995, the company merged with First Financial Management Corp. (FFMC) and was then organized into three major business units serving card issuers, merchants, and consumers. Western Union became part of First Data as a result of the merger with FFMC.

=== Expansion ===
From 2001 through 2005, First Data acquired companies around the globe and in the US, including, in 2001, the acquisition of PaySys International and their VisionPLUS Payment Software System. VisionPLUS was followed by a $6.6 billion merger with Concord EFS, Inc. in 2004, which added the STAR Network and PIN-based debit acceptance at more than 1.9 million ATM and retail locations. Additional acquisitions and strategic relationships included GovOne, eONEGlobal, Paymap, Inc., and Taxware. Nevertheless, First Data eventually divested, closed down, or absorbed these businesses.

On January 26, 2006, First Data announced its intention to spin off Western Union into an independent publicly traded company through a tax-free spin-off of 100% of Western Union to First Data shareholders. The spin off occurred as planned on September 29, 2006.

On April 2, 2007, it was announced that KKR had entered an agreement to acquire First Data in one of the largest leveraged buy-outs in history, and on October 1, 2007, KKR officially took over the First Data Corporation. Ric Duques retired, and Michael Capellas, previously the CEO of MCI Inc., the president of Hewlett-Packard Company, and also the chairman/CEO of the Compaq Computer Corporation was appointed CEO. As a privately owned company, First Data's stock was taken off the New York Stock Exchange on September 24, 2007. However, the company's LBO was financed with $24 billion in debt, and it remains heavily leveraged.

In June 2014, First Data raised a historic $3.5 billion private placement. $1.2 billion of the placement came from KKR; however, the majority, $2.3 billion, was from hedge funds, mutual funds, and institutions. With this action the company reduced total debt by $3.3 billion, improving net leverage by 1.3 turns and significantly reducing annual cash interest payments. The company continues to maintain investor relations pages on its web site and to publish quarterly financial results. Within two months of the KKR acquisition, the company laid off 1,700 employees across North America, Europe, and Australia, about 6% of its workforce.

First Data provided Go-Tag (contactless and mobile payment technology) stickers to delegates and media representatives at the 2008 Democratic National Convention in Denver, who used them to buy food and beverages. These stickers possessed NFC chips which were read by First Data scanners, which through its back-end system deducted the purchase sum from the Go-Tag ID's balance. First Data provided the trusted service manager that provisioned accounts to the new mobile Google Wallet system.

First Data entered the Ireland market in a joint venture with Allied Irish Banks PLC named AIB Merchant Services on January 18, 2008. First Data also acquired ICICI Bank's merchant services business in 2009 for 4 billion Indian rupees (US$80 million). It also partnered with Bank of America in 2009 to form Bank of America Merchant Services.

First Data and KKR vetted more than 60 startups before, in October 2013, announcing it had acquired POS startup Clover, cardless mobile loyalty startup Perka, and Gyft in 2014.

In March 2010, Joe Forehand took over as chairman and interim CEO. In September that same year, Jonathan Judge assumed those roles until his early retirement in January 2013, after which Edward Labry covered the interim post.

=== Under Frank Bisignano ===
In April 2013, First Data's Board of Directors announced that former JPMorgan Chase Co-COO Frank Bisignano had been named Chief Executive Officer of the company. In March 2014, Bisignano assumed the role of Chairman. Upon taking office, Bisignano launched an equity ownership plan for all 24,000 of First Data owner-associates.

In 2014, Bisignano promoted additions to the company's staff, such as Sanjiv Das, Himanshu Patel, Guy Chiarello, Cindy Armine-Klein, Andrew Gelb, Adam Rosman, Carmen Menendez-Puerto, Joseph Plumeri, Christopher Augustin and Michael Manos.

In early 2014, First Data's STAR ATM Network adopted the Visa and MasterCard common application IDs for EMV-compliant debit transactions.

Since joining, Bisignano tried to "transform First Data into a provider of new technology for small- and medium-sized businesses". In June 2014, First Data introduced the Insightics solution for small and medium size businesses. Insightics is a cloud-based software that enables small and medium size businesses to monitor key business metrics. First Data created Insightics with Palantir.

In August 2014, First Data expanded its presence in Brazil with Bin, the company's acquiring solution developed specifically for the local market. In September 2014, First Data announced it would provide encryption technology for Apple Pay. Apple Pay allows payment with a single touch. With its integration into First Data's STAR Network, the company became a token service provider, supporting safe POS transactions in Apple Pay. Such transactions are used in venues such as all McDonald's restaurants in the US.

In October 2014, First Data announced the Enhanced TransArmor Solution for small businesses. First Data's TransArmor Solution protects payment card data throughout the transaction process, incorporating several security and compliance products into one multi-layered solution.

In late 2014, First Data announced its collaboration with Capgemini to develop new solutions based on First Data's AccessPLUS and VisionPLUS products, planning to offer new technologies in the second quarter of 2015. The company also announced its partnership with Verifone, wherein merchants using integrated point-of-sale systems that process payments will have a security option when using terminals made by VeriFone Systems Inc. In 2015, Samsung announced its Samsung Pay mobile system in conjunction with First Data. Samsung Pay uses NFC to make payments at POS systems that accept First Data's technology.

In February 2015, First Data reported its first profitable quarter in 29 quarters since its 2007 privatization. In July 2015, First Data acquired Transaction Wireless, a provider of gift card solutions. In September that year, First Data Corporation acquired Spree Commerce, an open source e-commerce platform. Details of the transaction were not disclosed.

In the biggest U.S. IPO of 2015 according to Bloomberg, First Data planned to seek a minimum of $2.5 billion, even up to $3.2 billion (according to Bloomberg) or $3.7 billion (according to the Wall Street Journal). In October that year, First Data sold 160 million shares for $16 apiece, after offering them for $18 and $20. It raised $2.56 billion. According to Bloomberg: "lowering First Data's debt level will be an important step for the company because it will free up money to invest in the business".

=== 2016 and 2017 ===
First Data and Alipay announced a partnership in October 2016 to bring Alipay's mobile payment processing to the United States. Later in 2017, First Data and Alipay announced the implementation of the "point-of-sale" technology, and that Clover would be the first point-of-sale to accept the mobile payment method.

In 2017 First Data announced the launch of their Integrated Solutions Group (ISG), with Edward Jackson to lead the new business segment. Later that February, First Data announced its first ISG partner, ShopKeep, a technology company that allows an iPad to be used as a cash register. In March 2017 First Data announced the acquisition of Acculynk, an ecommerce technology company focused on debit payments.

In May 2017 First Data announced their Global PFAC product, which provided payment facilitators with access to a single integration interface. On May 29, 2017, First Data announced its plans to acquire CardConnect, a provider of payment processing which processed approximately $26 billion of volume annually, for $750 million.

In June 2017, First Data launched Fraud Detect, which uses artificial intelligence and machine learning, fraud scoring, cybersecurity intelligence, and information from the "Dark Web" to identify potentially fraudulent transactions. On October 20, 2017, First Data announced plans to acquire BluePay, a technology-enabled payment processor with about $19 billion in annual volume, for $760 Million.

During 2018 First Data along with 90 additional Fortune 500 companies "paid an effective federal tax rate of 0% or less" as a result of Donald Trump´s Tax Cuts and Jobs Act of 2017.

=== Acquisition by Fiserv ===
On January 16, 2019, First Data announced it would be acquired by Fiserv in an all stock transaction valued at $22 billion. The deal was scheduled to be finalized in the second half of 2019. Fiserv completed the acquisition of First Data on July 29, 2019.

== Headquarters ==
First Data's original headquarters, where the company remained based until 1992, were in Omaha, Nebraska. They later moved their headquarters to Greenwood Village, Colorado. In 2009 First Data announced that it was moving its headquarters from Greater Denver to Atlanta. While the official First Data headquarters are located in Atlanta, Georgia, First Data's principal executive offices are in New York City.

== Philanthropy ==
In October 2014, First Data launched First Data Salutes. First Data Salutes is the company-wide military engagement strategy aimed at helping the veteran-owned business community and service members and their families transitioning to civilian careers.

In 2015, First Data made a seven-year, $7 million commitment to the Institute for Veterans and Military Families at Syracuse University to fund education, research, training, and other opportunities for transitioning veterans entering the business community. The company was listed on DiversityInc's 25 Noteworthy Companies for 2015. In May 2017 First Data was recognized as the #1 company on the Military Times annual "Best for Vets: Employers 2017" list.
