= Toast, Inc. =

Cloud-based restaurant software company

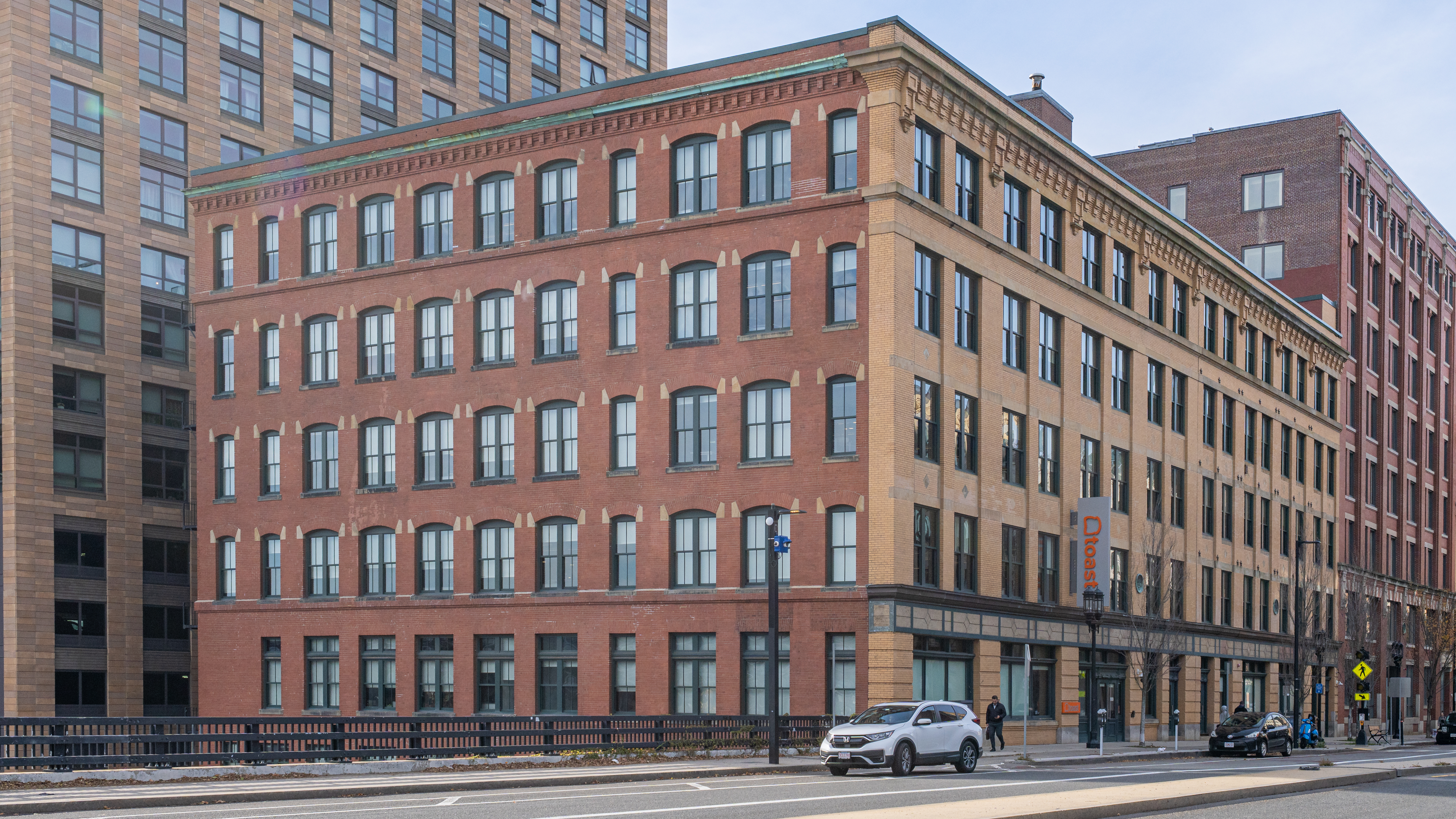
- Headquarters in Seaport District
- Type: Public
- Traded as: NYSE: TOST (Class A); S&P 400 component
- Industry: Point of sale
- Founded: 2012; 14 years ago
- Founders: Steve Fredette; Aman Narang; Jonathan Grimm
- Headquarters: Boston, Massachusetts, U.S.
- Area served: United States
- Key people: Aman Narang (CEO)
- Products: Cloud-based point of sale systems for restaurants and bars
- Revenue: ▲US$6.15 billion (2025)
- Net income: ▲US$342 million (2025)
- Total assets: ▲US$3.15 billion (2025)
- Total equity: ▲US$2.12 billion (2025)
- Number of employees: 5,700 (2024)
- Website: www.toasttab.com

Toast, Inc. is an American cloud-based restaurant management software company based in Boston, Massachusetts. The company provides an all-in-one point of sale (POS) system built on the Android operating system.

== History ==
Toast's founders—Steve Fredette, Aman Narang, and Jonathan Grimm—initially created a consumer app centered for mobile payments, customer loyalty, promotions, and social aspects that integrated with restaurants’ existing POS systems.

In February 2020, Toast received $400 million in a round of Series F funding including Bessemer Venture Partners and TPG, at a valuation of $4.9 billion. As of June 2024, Toast is used in approximately 120,000 US restaurants.

In April 2020, Toast laid off 50% of its workforce due to the COVID-19 pandemic and its economic impact on the restaurant industry.

In November 2020, Toast had a secondary sale that valued the company at around $8 billion, despite laying off half of its employees in April. On September 22, 2021, Toast went public with an initial public offering under the stock symbol TOST. The company offered shares at $40 initially, with a market capitalization of roughly $20 billion, making it one of 2021's largest American IPOs.

In February 2023, it was announced that Toast had acquired Delphi Display Systems, a Costa Mesa-headquartered producer of digital display solutions and drive-thru technology for fast-food restaurants.

Toast headquarters were located at Landmark Center from 2015 until June 2023. The company moved into its new headquarters on Summer Street in the Seaport District in early 2024.

== Products ==
First launched in 2012, Toast's restaurant management system operates on the Android operating system and includes four devices: Flex (a terminal available in single-screen, guest-facing and kitchen displays), Tap (a three-in-one payment processing device that supports contactless payments), Toast Hub, and receipt printer.

The company started supporting reservations in April 2023, entering into competition with OpenTable and Resy.

== Recognition ==
In May 2016, the New England Venture Capital Association (NEVCA) named Toast the winner of the Hottest Startup: A+ at the 2016 NEVY awards.

== See also ==
- Square (financial services)
