= Trusted service manager =

A trusted service manager (TSM) is a role in a near field communication ecosystem. It acts as a neutral broker that sets up business agreements and technical connections with mobile network operators, phone manufacturers or other entities controlling the secure element on mobile phones. The trusted service manager enables service providers to distribute and manage their contactless applications remotely by allowing access to the secure element in NFC-enabled handsets.

The term is a standardized name used by the GSM Association, the European Payments Council, and the NFC Forum.

== Typical functions ==
- End to end security
- Activation and deactivation of services
- Remote access to applications
- Interconnect with Mobile Network Operators and Service providers
- Application lifecycle management
- Managing keys for a trusted execution environment

These functions can be performed by mobile network operators, service providers or third parties, and or part can be delegated by one party to another.
