= Kachingo =

Kachingo was a short-lived "card free" customer rewards programme in New Zealand. Every time a customer spent over a certain amount at any one of the participating retail outlets, the customer would receive a ticket with a Game Line on it and could receive additional game lines by spending a higher amount or purchasing certain items in store. Each Game Line gave the customer a chance to win money.

Despite plans to launch the concept globally, the program never spread elsewhere; and closed down in New Zealand 2003, after about three years of operation.

== History ==
Kachingo was invented by Chris Berryman and sold to Strathmore Group in December 1999, run by Global Online systems. At the time it was a notable Linux-based system.

The programme was first trialed at Super Liquor outlets across New Zealand in December 2000. In October 2001, BP, Woolworths, Big Fresh, Price Chopper and KFC (Auckland North only) all joined the Kachingo programme offering rewards to customers shopping at participating stores.

Originally Kachingo included 3 draws from the one ticket, the first draw was a daily draw for $1000, the second a weekly draw for $10,000 and then a monthly draw for at least $250,000. In order to win the top prize the ticketholder needed to get all six numbers and the power number. In April 2002 the daily and weekly draws were dropped and the weekly draw was now for $100,000 each week, smaller prizes were for $5, $20 and $1000. As a bonus sometimes shoppers received instant prizes when making a Kachingo purchase these prizes included chocolate bars, Coke and Cadbury Creme Eggs.

Checking tickets could be done on the Kachingo website, on Teletext and in the store of any participating retailer. The Kachingo website rapidly became one of the most frequently visited in the country. Some stores had self checkers that customers could use to check tickets themselves prior to redeeming any winning tickets at the counter. Staff at the store could also check for winners by using their Point of Sale system.

== Closure ==
Kachingo ceased operations in New Zealand in March 2003. This followed the withdrawal of KFC, Progressive Enterprises and BP, and rumoured financial problems as redemptions rates increased. In announcing the demise of the program, operator Global Online claimed that the concept was to be launched elsewhere, this appears not to have come to fruition. In April 2003, Strathmore Group announced a write-down of NZ$492,000 associated with the demise of the program.
