= Fiserv =

Provider of financial services technology to banks

Fiserv, Inc.
- Type: Public
- Traded as: Nasdaq: FISV; S&P 500 component
- Founded: 1984; 42 years ago
- Headquarters: Milwaukee, Wisconsin, U.S.
- Key people: Takis Georgakopoulos; (president and CEO); Paul Todd; (CFO and Treasurer)
- Revenue: ▲US$19.8 billion (2025)
- Operating income: ▲US$4.38 billion (2025)
- Net income: ▲US$3.48 billion (2025)
- Total assets: ▲US$80.1 billion (2025)
- Total equity: ▼US$25.9 billion (2025)
- Owner: KKR & Co. (12%)
- Number of employees: c. 38,000 (2024)
- Website: www.fiserv.com

Fiserv, Inc. (/faɪˈsɜːrv/ fy-SURV) is an American multinational financial technology company headquartered in Milwaukee, Wisconsin. The company processes debit and credit card transactions, loyalty programs, loans, electronic bill pay, wires and ACH transfers, check deposits, and ATM transactions on behalf of banking institutions. The company also produces debit and credit cards and point of sale terminals.

Customers primarily include companies in the financial services sector, including banks, savings and loan associations, credit unions, securities broker dealers, mortgage, insurance, leasing and finance companies, and retailers. In 2024, 85% of the company's revenues were from the U.S. and Canada, while 15% of revenues were from other countries. Processing represented 81% of revenues and products, including software, hardware, and physical cards, represented 19% of revenue. The company is ranked 208th on the Fortune 500 and 269th on the Forbes Global 2000.

== History ==
=== 1980s and 1990s ===
Fiserv was founded in 1984, and within two years, it was listed on NASDAQ. The company experienced rapid growth mainly due to a series of acquisitions, including Citicorp Information Resources, a subsidiary of Citicorp, which was the largest acquisition in its early years. This acquisition put Fiserv into the commercial banking, internal and credit union core account processing market space.

In 1995, Fiserv acquired Information Technology, Inc., (ITI) of Lincoln, Nebraska. Thus, Fiserv acquired Premier, which at that time was the most widely implemented account processing platform in the US, and represented an increase in Fiserv's account processing clients. Fiserv also launched its website in 1995, and introduced fully electronic bill payment (branded as E-bills) in 1997, reaching $1 billion in revenue.

=== 2000s ===
In 2003, Fiserv acquired General American Corporation. It also acquired Consumer Network Services from Electronic Data Systems for $320 million.

In 2005, Jeff Yabuki became Fiserv's CEO, and the company acquired a number of businesses, including Del Mar Database, assets of U.S. eLending business from Emergis, Interactive Technologies, Administrative Services Group Inc., JW Hutton, BillMatrix, VerticalPoint, and Xcipio, Inc.

In 2006, Fiserv acquired CareGain, Inc., asset of CT Insurance Services & CCH Wall Street.

In 2007, Fiserv acquired NetEconomy and CheckFree — which had itself just acquired Corillian, Carreker, PhoneCharge and Upstream Technologies LLC. This was Fiserv's largest acquisition to date; CheckFree was at that time the leading provider of online banking, online bill payment, electronic bill payment services, and software for check clearance and ACH (also known as direct debit) processing.

In 2008, Fiserv made an acquisition of Interactive Technologies, Inc., provider of billing software and ancillary products for the banking and investment advisory industries, granting Fiserv control of their "Advantage Fee System" which calculates complex billing for fees and commissions. In the same year, Fiserv acquired i_Tech, a Montana-based item processing company that had been owned by First Interstate Bank. Fiserv also acquired The Data Center, a Texas-based item processing company, from BBVA Compass Bank.

=== 2010s ===
In 2010, Fiserv acquired AdviceAmerica, provider of software for financial institutions.

In 2011, Fiserv acquired M-Com. Established in 2000 and based in Auckland, New Zealand, M-Com developed mobile banking apps. Fiserv also in 2011 acquired Maverick Network Solutions, established in 2006 and based in Brandywine Hundred, Delaware, and CashEdge, developer of payment solutions, including Popmoney.

In 2013, Open Solutions, Inc., an account processing platform, was yet another company acquired by Fiserv, following a rebrand of Open Solutions managed by branding agency Bob's Your Uncle. Fiserv paid $55 million to acquire Open Solutions, by taking on $960 million in debt.

In 2016, Fiserv acquired Community Financial Services from ACI Worldwide and Convenience Pay from Hewlett Packard.

In 2017, Fiserv acquired Dovetail, Monitise and PCLender.

In 2018, Fiserv acquired MoneyPass, a surcharge-free debit card and ATM processing network, from Elan Financial Services, a unit of U.S. Bancorp.

In 2019, First Data, a payment processor, was acquired for $22 billion, making it one of the largest acquisitions in the financial technology sector.

=== 2020s ===
In 2020, Fiserv made an acquisition of Bypass Mobile, enterprise point of sale platform. In the same year, CEO Jeffery Yabuki stepped down and was replaced by Frank Bisignano.

In 2021, Fiserv acquired Ondot Systems, a digital experience platform for financial institutions; NetPay, a payment facilitator; and BentoBox, provider of online restaurant operations.

In 2022, Fiserv acquired Finxact, provider of cloud-based core banking services. The company also acquired TIF District in the same year.

The city of Milwaukee created a tax incremental financing district to incentivize Fiserv to remain in downtown Milwaukee, Wisconsin. The 7 million dollars will be available through annual payments, with the condition Fiserv must base at least 780 employees at the downtown location.

On June 6, 2023, Fiserv switched its stock listing from Nasdaq to the New York Stock Exchange and changed its ticker symbol from FISV to FI.

In October 2023, Fiserv acquired Skytef, the primary distributor of Software Express payment solution SiTef.

In March 2025, Fiserv completed the acquisition of Payfare.

In April 2025, Fiserv acquired Australian payment facilitator Pinch Payments for an undisclosed sum.

In April 2025, Fiserv agreed to acquire Money Money Servicos Financeiros S.A., a Brazil-based financial technology company.

In 2025, CEO Frank Bisignano resigned after he was confirmed as commissioner of the Social Security Administration.

In October 2025, Fiserv stock lost more than 40% of its value after the company reported lower quarter earnings and a lower forecast for the year, citing customer complaints of fees related to its Clover platform.

On November 11, 2025, after over 2 years on the NYSE under the symbol FI, Fiserv switched its stock exchange listing back to the Nasdaq Global Select Market and changed its ticker symbol back to the one it used when it was on the Nasdaq, FISV.

In December 2025, Fiserv completed the acquisition of StoneCastle.

==== Litigation with Shift4 ====
Following its 2019 acquisition of First Data, Fiserv inherited a significant legal dispute between its subsidiary CardConnect and rival payments company Shift4. The lawsuit included allegations of breach of contract and lasted for several years. The case was ultimately settled in late 2022 after a direct agreement was reached between Fiserv CEO Frank Bisignano and Shift4 CEO Jared Isaacman. The terms of the settlement remain confidential.

== Acquisitions and mergers ==
- Largest acquisition: First Data Corporation in 2019 for $22 billion
- Total acquisitions: Over 24 companies since inception
- Focus areas: Payments, financial technology, banking services, and digital solutions

Year	Acquisition/Merger	Details
1991	Citicorp Information Resources	Entered commercial banking and credit union core account processing market
1995	Information Technology, Inc. (ITI)	Acquired Premier account processing platform
2003	General American Corporation (GAC)	Major corporate acquisition
2005	Multiple Acquisitions	Included Del Mar Database, Interactive Technologies, BillMatrix, and others
2006	CareGain, Inc.	Technology acquisition
2006	Asset of CT Insurance Services	Financial services expansion
2007	CheckFree Corporation	Largest acquisition to date, leading online banking and bill payment services
2007	NetEconomy	Technology services acquisition
2008	Interactive Technologies, Inc.	Billing software provider
2008	The Data Center	Texas-based item processing company
2010	AdviceAmerica	Software for financial institutions
2011	M-Com	Mobile banking apps
2011	CashEdge	Payment solutions
2016	Community Financial Services	From ACI Worldwide
2017	Dovetail	Technology services
2018	MoneyPass	Surcharge-free debit card network
2019	First Data Corporation	$22 billion merger, transformative combination
2020	Bypass Mobile	Enterprise point of sale platform
2021	Ondot Systems, Inc.	Digital experience platform
2021	BentoBox	Restaurant operations technology
2022	Finxact	Cloud-based core banking services
2022	Merchant One	Independent sales organization
2022	Yacare	Argentinian payment service provider
2023	Skytef	Brazilian payment solutions distributor
2025	Payfare Inc.	Embedded finance and program management solutions
2025	Pinch Payments	Australian payment facilitator and management platform
2025	StoneCastle	Insured deposit platform provider

== Products ==
Fiserv offers multiple products, including:

- Carat, a platform that organizes payments and experiences for large businesses
- CardHub, which allows customers to get digital payment cards
- Clover, for small businesses to accept payments at the point of sale, as well as to track sales
- Pinch Payments, a payment facilitator providing embedded card processing and direct debit to SaaS and to small businesses via proprietary SaaS that integrates with Xero, Quickbooks and MYOB.
