= Gratuity =

Sum of money customarily tendered to service sector workers

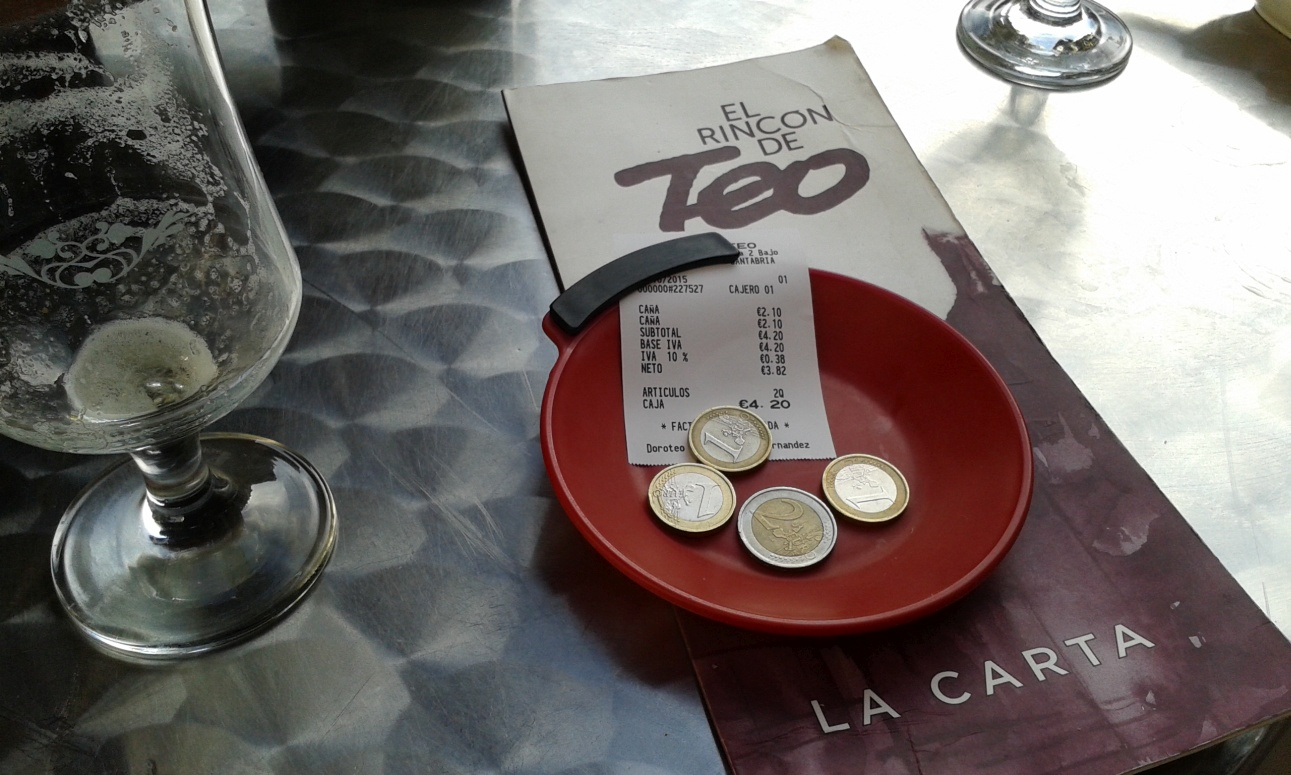
Leaving some change on the restaurant table is one way of giving a gratuity to the restaurant staff.

A gratuity (often called a tip) is a sum of money customarily given by a customer to certain service sector workers such as hospitality for the service they have performed, in addition to the basic price of the service.

Tips and their amount are a matter of social custom and etiquette, and the custom varies between countries and between settings. In some countries, it is customary to tip servers in bars and restaurants, taxi drivers, tattoo artists, hair stylists and so on. However, in some places tipping is not expected and may be discouraged or considered insulting. The customary amount of a tip can be a specific range or a certain percentage of the bill based on the perceived quality of the service given.

It is illegal to offer tips to some groups of workers, such as U.S. government workers and more widely police officers, as the tips may be regarded as bribery. A fixed percentage service charge is sometimes added to bills in restaurants and similar establishments. Tipping may not be expected when a fee is explicitly charged for the service.

According to the U.S. Department of Labor, a tipped employee is a worker who receives more than $30 per month on tips. He or she is required to be paid $2.13 hourly in direct wages provided that the amount combined with the amount received as a tip equals the federal minimum wage. If the combined amount does not reach the applicable minimum wage, the employer is expected to make up the difference.

Giving a tip is typically irreversible, differentiating it from the reward mechanism of a placed order, which can be refunded. From a theoretical economic point of view, gratuities may solve the principal–agent problem (the situation in which an agent, such as a server, is working for a principal, such as a restaurant owner or manager) and many managers believe that tips provide an incentive for greater worker effort. However, studies of the practice in America suggest that tipping is often discriminatory or arbitrary: workers receive different levels of gratuity based on factors such as age, sex, race, hair color and even breast size, and the size of the gratuity is found to be only tenuously related to the quality of service.

== Etymology ==
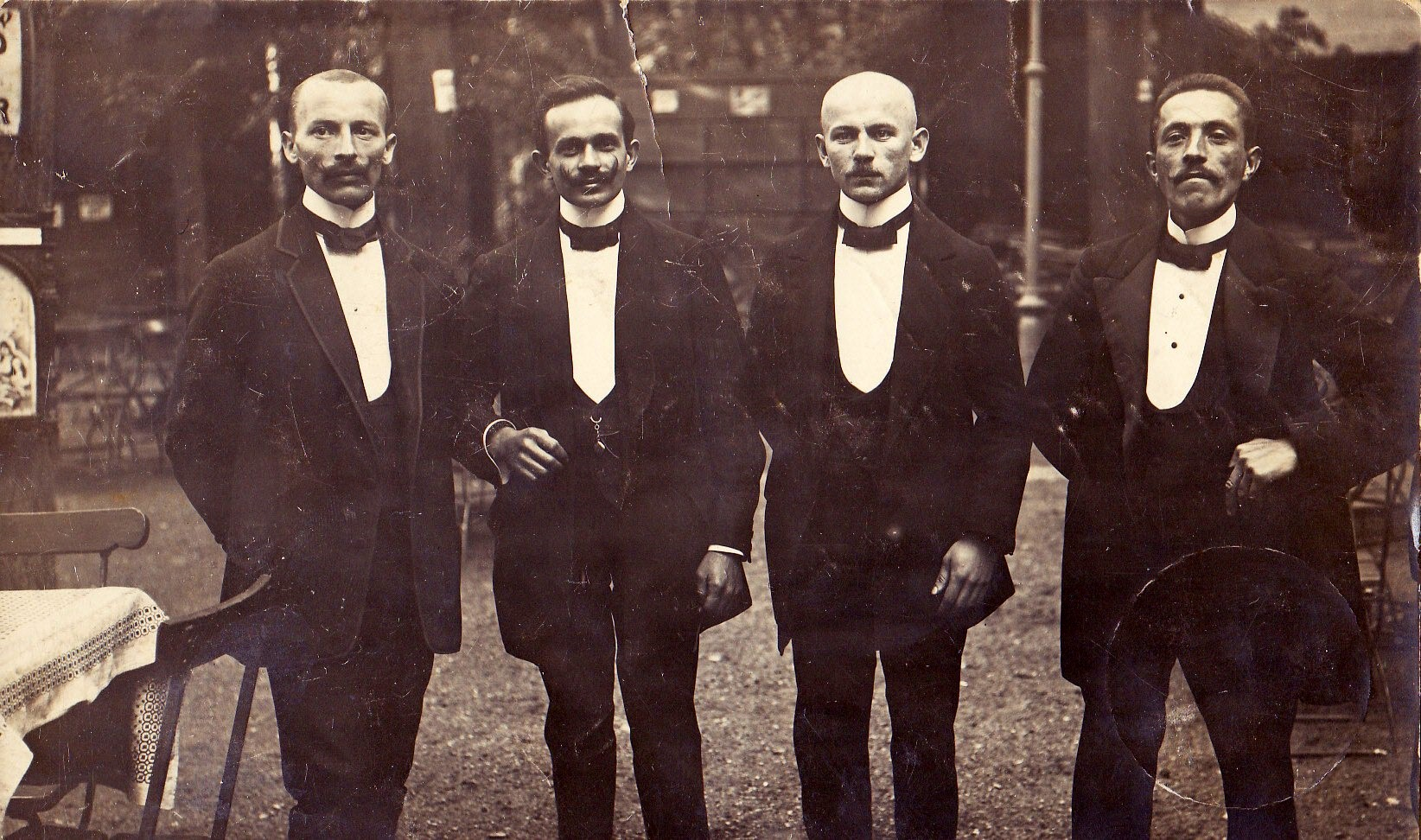
Waiters in Breslau, Germany (now Wrocław, Poland), in 1913

According to the Oxford English Dictionary, the word "tip" originated as a slang term and its etymology is unclear. According to the Online Etymology Dictionary, the meaning "give a small present of money" began around 1600, and the meaning "give a gratuity to" is first attested in 1706. The noun in this sense is from 1755. The term in the sense of "to give a gratuity" first appeared in the 18th century. It derived from an earlier sense of tip, meaning "to give; to hand, pass", which originated in the thieves' cant in the 17th century. This sense may have derived from the 16th-century "tip" meaning "to strike or hit smartly but lightly" (which may have derived from the Low German tippen, "to tap"), but this derivation is "very uncertain". The word "tip" was first used as a verb in 1707 in George Farquhar's play The Beaux' Stratagem. Farquhar used the term after it had been "used in criminal circles as a word meant to imply the unnecessary and gratuitous gifting of something somewhat taboo, like a joke, or a sure bet, or illicit money exchanges."

The etymology for the synonym for tipping, "gratuity", dates back either to the 1520s, from "graciousness", from the French gratuité (14th century) or directly from Medieval Latin gratuitas, "free gift", probably from earlier Latin gratuitus, "free, freely given". The meaning "money given for favor or services" is first attested in the 1530s. In some languages, the term translates to "drink money" or similar: for example pourboire in French, Trinkgeld in German, drikkepenge in Danish, drinksilver in Middle Scots, and napiwek in Polish. This comes from a custom of inviting a servant to drink a glass in honour of the guest and paying for it in order for the guests to show generosity among each other. The term bibalia in Latin was recorded in 1372.

== History ==
The practice of tipping began in Tudor England. In medieval times, tipping was a master-serf custom wherein a servant would receive extra money for having performed superbly well. By the 17th century, it was expected that overnight guests to private homes would provide sums of money, known as vails, to the host's servants. Soon afterwards, customers began tipping in London coffeehouses and other commercial establishments".

The practice was imported from Europe to America in the 1850s and 1860s by Americans who wanted to seem aristocratic. However, until the early 20th century, Americans viewed tipping as inconsistent with the values of an egalitarian, democratic society, as the origins of tipping were premised upon noblesse oblige, which promoted tipping as a means to establish social status to inferiors. Six American states passed laws that made tipping illegal. Enforcement of anti-tipping laws was problematic. The earliest of these laws was passed in 1909 (Washington), and the last of these laws was repealed in 1926 (Mississippi). Some have argued that "The original workers that were not paid anything by their employers were newly freed slaves" and that "This whole concept of not paying them anything and letting them live on tips carried over from slavery."

Also, proprietors regarded tips as equivalent to bribing an employee to do something that was otherwise forbidden, such as tipping a waiter to get an extra large portion of food. However, the introduction of Prohibition in the US in 1919 had an enormous impact on hotels and restaurants, who lost the revenue of selling alcoholic beverages. The resulting financial pressure caused proprietors to welcome tips as a way of supplementing employee wages. Contrary to popular belief, tipping did not arise because of servers' low wages, because the occupation of waiter (server) was fairly well paid in the era when tipping became institutionalized.

== Reasons for tipping ==
Tipping researcher Michael Lynn identifies five motivations for tipping:

- Showing off
- To supplement the server's income and make them happy
- For improved future service
- To avoid disapproval from the server
- A sense of duty

A 2009 academic paper by economics professor Steven J. Holland calls tipping "an effective mechanism for risk sharing and welfare improvement" which reduces the risk faced by a customer when purchasing a service of "uncertain quality", because the customer can decide whether or not to tip, thereby "making part of the price of the service discretionary". Tipping is sometimes given as an example of the principal–agent problem in economics. One example is a restaurant owner who engages servers to act as agents on his behalf. In some cases, "[c]ompensation agreements [can] increase worker effort [...] if compensation is [...] tied to the firm's success" and one example of such a compensation agreement is waiters and waitresses who are paid tips. Studies show however that, in the real world, the size of the tip is only weakly correlated with the quality of the service and other effects dominate.

== Tronc ==
A term primarily used in the United Kingdom, a tronc is an arrangement for the pooling and distribution to employees of tips, gratuities and/or service charges in the hotel and catering trade. The person who distributes monies from the tronc is known as the troncmaster. In the UK, where a tronc exists, responsibility for deducting pay-as-you-earn taxes from the distribution may lie with the troncmaster rather than the employer.

== Mandatory tipping ==
Tipping may not be expected when a fee is explicitly charged for the service. A service charge is sometimes added to bills in restaurants and similar establishments. Attempts to hide the service charge by obscuring the line on the receipt have been reported. A service charge, or fee assessed, is determined by and paid directly to the company. The charges may be for services rendered, administrative fees, or processing costs.

In the United States, criminal charges were dropped in two separate cases over non-payment of mandatory gratuities. Courts ruled that automatic does not mean mandatory. Some cruise lines charge their patrons US$10 per day in mandatory tipping; this does not include extra gratuities for alcoholic beverages.

== Criticisms ==
=== Inconsistency of percentage-based gratuities ===
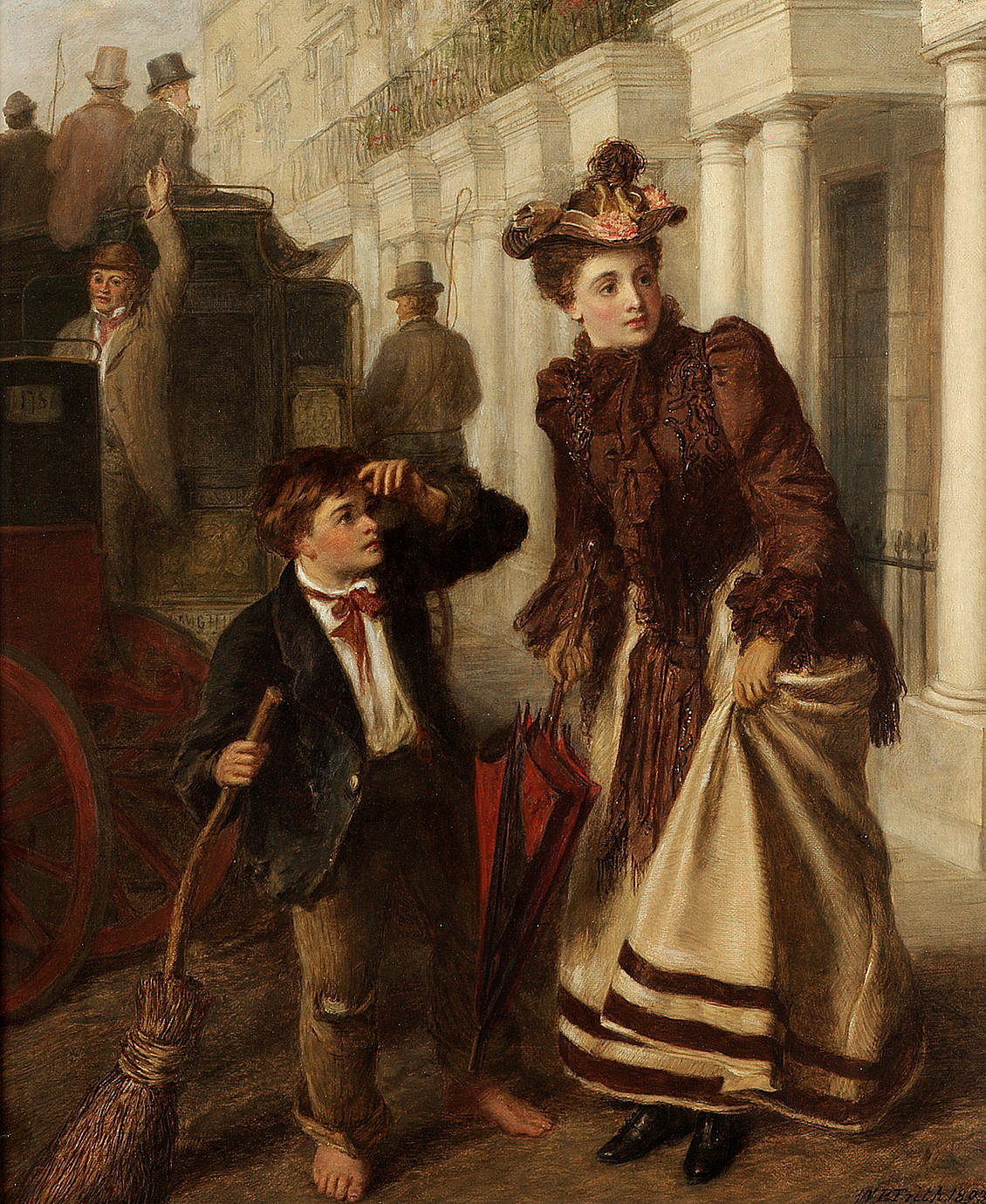
Crossing sweepers cleared the way for rich people to cross the road without dirtying their clothes and they were normally tipped for this service (London, 1893). A similar service in modern times is offered by "squeegee men" who clean vehicle windshields while stopped for traffic lights (often without the consent of the driver).

In countries where tipping is the norm, some employers pay workers with the expectation that their wages will be supplemented by tips. Some have criticized the inherent "social awkwardness" in transactions that involve tipping, the inconsistency of tipping for some services but not similar ones, and the irrationality of basing tips on price rather than the amount and quality of service (a customer pays a larger tip to a server bringing a lobster rather than a hamburger, for example).

=== Travellers following home rather than local customs ===
Some nationalities, such as people from the United States, are used to paying tips and often do so even when they visit countries where this is less of a norm. In contrast, tourists from such countries may neglect or even refuse to pay tips when they visit countries such as the US where tips are expected. This is particularly common in American cities along the Canadian border and is seen as a problem by many in the hospitality sector.

=== Moral aspects ===
Some service providers may view tipping as derogating to their occupation, as "a token of inferiority". In The Itching Palm, a 1916 critique of tipping, American writer William R. Scott wrote, "The relation of a man giving a tip and a man accepting it is as undemocratic as the relation of master and slave. A citizen in a republic ought to stand shoulder to shoulder with every other citizen, with no thought of cringing, without an assumption of superiority or an acknowledgment of inferiority." Around the same time, Australian senator Myles Ferricks criticised tipping in a parliamentary speech as anti-egalitarian and "encouraging servility among working people".

=== Discrimination ===
In the episode of the Freakonomics podcast Lynn found that "attractive waitresses get better tips than less attractive waitresses. Men’s appearance, not so important". Lynn's research also found that "blondes get better tips than brunettes. Slender women get better tips than heavier women. Large breasted women get better tips than smaller breasted women. Surprisingly, at least in the studies I’ve done, women in their 30s get better tips than either younger or older women.” A woman server interviewed for the podcast episode stated, "lost my job because my manager said that I didn’t fit the look of the company, or the restaurant. So I don’t know if it was because I’m a lot more curvier than the other girls or because my skin is darker. I don’t know".

Lynn states of tipping, "It’s discriminatory. Yes, and the Supreme Court has ruled that even neutral business practices that are not intended to discriminate, if they have the effect of adversely impacting a protected class are illegal. And so it’s not inconceivable to me that there will be a class-action lawsuit on the part of ethnic minority waiters and waitresses claiming discrimination in terms of employment. And it’s conceivable that tipping might be declared illegal on that basis.”

=== Tipflation ===
In the United States since the 2020s, some argue that there is an increasing expectation for customers to tip more frequently and at higher rates. This is often due to the influence of digital payment systems and changing service industry norms.
