= China Railway Loyalty Programme =

Railway loyalty programme in China

China Railway Loyalty Programme is the frequent traveler loyalty program launched by the China State Railway Group (CR) through its official website and mobile application, 12306. Formally launched in 2017, the program allows passengers to earn points through travel and redeem them for train tickets for themselves or authorized designees.

== Membership ==
The program is open to natural persons aged 12 and above. Registration is available via the 12306 APP or at designated station windows using valid identification documents.

Newly registered members typically start at the Two-Star level.

== Point System ==
=== Accumulation ===
Members earn points after completing trips on eligible trains. Points are calculated based on the ticket price:

- Base Points: Earned at a rate of 5 points per 1 CNY of the ticket price (rounded to the nearest whole number).
- Exclusions: Points are currently not awarded for on-board upgrades, non-real-name trains, or international rail services.

As of 2025, specific age-based bonus policies have been implemented:

- Senior Citizens: Effective April 1, 2025, passengers aged 60 and above (excluding foreign nationals without permanent residency) earn points at 15 times the ticket price.
- Youth Members: Effective October 20, 2025, passengers aged 14 to 28 (excluding foreign nationals without permanent residency) earn points at 10 times the ticket price. This bonus cannot be combined with student ticket discounts.

=== Redemption ===
- Eligibility: Members become eligible for redemption once their account reaches a cumulative 10,000 points (including expired points).
- Value: 100 points are equivalent to 1 CNY.
- Usage: Redemption is only available for train services marked with the "Dui" (兑, meaning "Redeem") symbol in the 12306 app. Reward tickets are non-refundable and the destination cannot be changed. However, they may be rescheduled to other "redeemable" trains for a fee of 1,000 points.

=== Validity and Point Extension ===
Standard points are valid for 12 months from the date they are credited to the account. During the COVID-19 pandemic in mainland China, China Railway issued several blanket extensions for points due to travel restrictions.

In the event of a train delay or cancellation, passengers may use the non-fault refund mechanism to get their spent points back and have the expiration date recalculated.

== Tier Benefits ==
In addition to point redemption, high-tier members enjoy premium services at selected stations.

- Seat Upgrades: Points can be used for on-board seat upgrades.
- Point Reclamation: If points fail to credit automatically, members may apply for a manual claim within 90 days of the travel date.
