= Clover Network =

Cloud-based Android point of sale platform

Coordinates: 37°23′11.76″N 122°1′54.07″W

Clover Network, Inc.

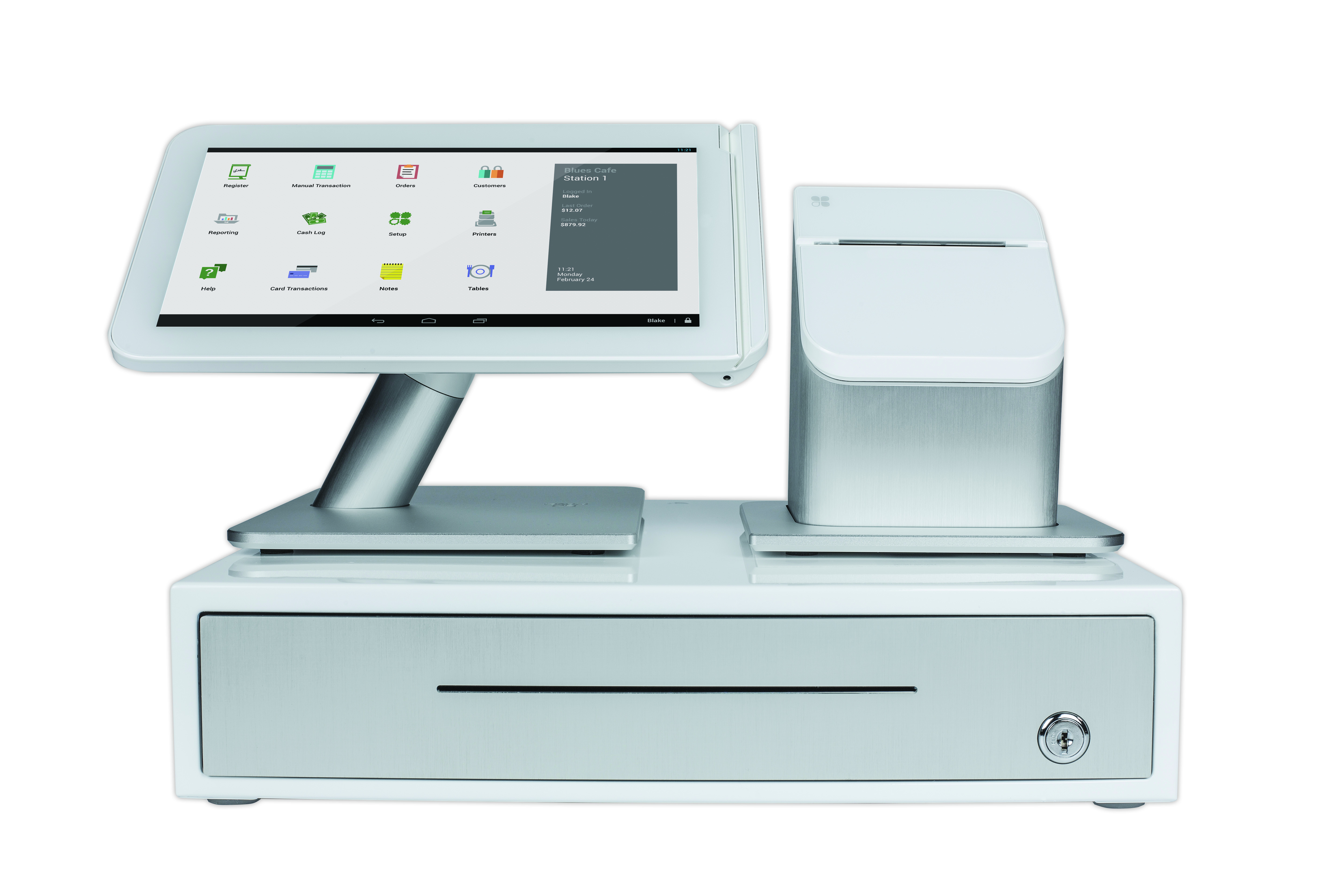
- The touchscreen Clover Station with a receipt printer and cash drawer.
- Type: Subsidiary
- Industry: POS
- Founded: October 2010
- Founders: Leonard Speiser, John Beatty, Kelvin Zheng
- Headquarters: Sunnyvale, California, United States
- Area served: Worldwide
- Number of employees: 400+
- Parent: Fiserv (through First Data)
- Website: www.clover.com

Clover is a cloud-based Android point of sale (POS) platform that was launched in April 2012. The company is headquartered in Sunnyvale, California, United States. As of the quarter ended September 2020, Clover processed $133 billion of annualized card transactions worldwide, making it the largest U.S. cloud POS firm.

Clover was acquired on December 28, 2012, by First Data Corporation, which itself was acquired by Fiserv, the world's largest merchant acquirer, on July 29, 2019. Bank of America Merchant Services was the first to announce it would sell Clover to its merchant base in October 2013. PNC Merchant Services was the second to announce it would sell Clover to its merchant base.

== History ==
=== Funding and early history ===
Clover was incorporated on October 15, 2010, and raised $5.5M on November 1, 2010. The lead investor was Sutter Hill Ventures with participation from Andreessen Horowitz and a number of angel investors. The company was founded by John Beatty, Leonard Speiser, Mark C. Schulze and Kelvin Zheng. The company secured an additional $3M convertible note from Sutter Hill Ventures in April 2012.

=== First hardware product ===
Clover launched its first hardware solution, the Clover Station, in 2013 and began shipping it in January 2014. Clover opened its App Marketplace to third-party developers in 2014. Gyft announced the launch of its Gift Cloud Service on Clover in April 2014.

First Data announced the sale of 17,000 Clover Stations six months after the release of the product. This put Clover ahead of Square Stand in terms of total units shipped.

On September 9, 2014, Clover announced its work with Apple to support Apple Pay via its Android POS Platform. Clover described the functionality in a blog post that was featured on the home page of Hacker News.

=== Second hardware product ===
Clover announced its second hardware product, the Clover Mobile, at the Money 20/20 conference in November 2014. On March 19, 2015, Clover Mobile] won the gold medal for the Best POS innovation at the PYMNTS.com Innovator Awards ceremony. Clover Mobile features a complete EMVCo compliant payments solution with an on-screen pin-pad, that is fully PCI PTS 4.0 compliant. It also features an EMVCo compliant Contactless payment interface which enables it to support Apple Pay among other contactless payment modes. The device has an ergonomic handle with an integrated barcode scanner, with an external wireless mobile printer accessory designed to keep the device lightweight and reduce fatigue.

=== Third hardware product ===
Clover's third hardware product, the Clover Mini was launched by First Data on June 16, 2015. Like Clover Mobile, Clover Mini is a PCI PTS 4.0 approved, EMVCo compliant contact and contactless next generation payment device. Clover Mini has a built-in receipt printer and is designed to be a terminal replacement with the support for advanced payments interfaces, while also allowing Merchants to install apps from the Clover App Market. Clover Mini also features a USB hub allowing easy interface of peripherals such as external barcode scanners, cash drawer and a Merchant keypad (for cases where the Mini is Customer-facing).

=== First Data acquisition ===
On December 28, 2012, Clover entered into a merger agreement with First Data Corporation. In a radio interview with Wharton professor Rahul Kapoor and co-founder Mark C Schulze the structure of the acquisition was explained. An operating agreement was put into place whereby Clover would receive $100M in funding to run independently. First Data would be responsible for sales and support, while Clover built all new payment hardware/software for the company. The deal utilized a "Founder's Clause" that would trigger a very large penalty payment if the parent company interfered with operations of Clover.

Clover is now owned by Fiserv through the acquisition of First Data Corporation.

== Sponsorships ==
Clover sponsored race team Chip Ganassi Racing (2016-2021) with their partnership with First Data and Credit One Bank. Clover was also one of the sleeve sponsors for the San Jose Earthquakes.

In 2026, Clover in partnership with Fiserv became the jersey sponsor of Tipperary GAA in Ireland.
