= Square (financial services) =

Financial services provided by Block, Inc.

- Website type: Financial services platform
- Available in: English, French, Japanese, Spanish
- Country of origin: United States
- Area served: List of countries: United States; Australia; Canada; France; Japan; Republic of Ireland; Spain; United Kingdom
- Creators: Jack Dorsey, Jim McKelvey, Tristan O’Tierney
- Industry: Financial services; Point-of-sale systems; E-commerce; Small business banking
- Products: List of products: Square Point of Sale; Square for Restaurants; Square for Retail; Square Online; Square for Beauty Salons; Square Payments; Square Invoices; Square Appointments; Square CRM; Square Subscriptions; Square Shifts; Square Loans
- Services: List of services: Card payment processing; E-commerce management; Customer bookings; Inventory management; Payroll processing; Shift scheduling; Small business banking; Small business financing
- Revenue: ▲$2.68 billion (2024)
- Parent: Block, Inc.
- Website: squareup.com
- Users: 4 million sellers
- Launched: 2009; 17 years ago
- Current status: Active

Square is a point-of-sale system for sellers with physical or online stores. Launched in 2009 by Block, Inc. (formerly Square, Inc.), it enables merchants to accept card payments and manage business operations. As of 2024, Square is the U.S. market leader in point-of-sale systems, serving 4 million sellers and processing $228bn annually.

Square is cloud-based and offers both physical devices, which read payment card information, and software. It offers financial services and includes features designed to support business operations. Square provides e-commerce and inventory capabilities, customer appointments, payroll processing, shift scheduling, and access to banking and business loans. As of 2024, Square is available in the United States, Australia, Canada, France, Japan, Republic of Ireland, Spain and the U.K.

== History ==
=== 2009–2011: Launch, early years ===
The inspiration for Square occurred to Jack Dorsey in 2009, when his friend Jim McKelvey was unable to complete a $2,000 sale of his glass faucets and fittings because he could not accept credit cards. In December 2009, Dorsey announced the launch of Square, which allowed merchants and individuals to accept secure payment from credit and other cards using a mobile phone and a "card-reading dongle".

At the TechCrunch Disrupt conference in May 2011, Square announced the release of two apps, Square Card Case (later rebranded Square Wallet) and Square Register. Square Wallet, before it was removed from the Apple App Store and Google Play Store in 2014, allowed customers to set up a tab and pay for their order by providing their name (or a barcode) using a stored credit, debit, or gift card.

=== 2012–2016: Feature additions ===
In April 2012, rival payment company Verifone claimed that the Square system was insecure and that a reasonably skilled programmer could write a replacement app that could use the Square device to skim a credit card and return its details, because of the lack of encryption. VeriFone posted a demonstration video and sample skimming app to its web site. Dorsey called VeriFone's claims "neither fair nor accurate", noting that all card data can be compromised by visually examining the card and that even if an attack succeeded, card issuers offered fraud protection. Square later introduced strong encryption on its devices. In August 2012, Starbucks announced it would use Square to process transactions with customers who pay via debit or credit card. In December 2012, the service introduced virtual gift cards.

In May 2013, Block announced that its Square service was available in Japan after agreeing to a partnership with Sumitomo Mitsui Card Corporation. In May 2013, Square announced it would no longer support firearms-related transactions. In June 2013, the firm launched Square Market, which allows sellers to create a free online storefront with online payment processing functionality. Square Stand was introduced the same month.

In February 2014, Whole Foods Market announced it would use Square Register at select stores' sandwich counters, pizzerias and coffee, juice, wine and beer bars. In March 2014, the firm announced it would allow sellers to accept bitcoin on their own storefronts through Square Market. The seller takes no risk of bitcoin value fluctuations. In July 2014 the firm announced a card reader that would accept chip cards and contactless cards. Later in the year, Square added physical gift cards as a feature. Square Appointments, an online booking tool, was launched the same year. In December 2014, The Wall Street Journal and CNN reported that Starbucks had stopped accepting payments from Square Wallet, and that the partnership between Starbucks and Square had been a money loser for Square and was nearing an end.

In June 2015, Apple announced Square would release a reader device capable of accepting Apple Pay and other contactless payments. In the same year, Square launched a reader for Android and iOS that accepts contactless and chip card payments. Additionally, the firm launched Square Payroll for small business owners to process payroll.

=== 2017–2021: Banking approval ===
In February 2017, Bloomberg reported that Square was growing the number of larger merchants on its platform by offering additional services such as loans through Square Capital, food delivery through "Caviar" and tools for managing inventory and analyzing sales. In October 2017, Square Register, was announced for small to medium-sized businesses. Square launched in the UK in 2017.

In August 2018, Square released a version of its magstripe reader with a Lightning connector, allowing it to be used on iPhones without a headphone jack. In October 2018, the company introduced its Terminal product. That Square began allowing merchants to develop custom interfaces for the platform, via an application programming interface. Square Financial Services was officially launched as an industrial loan company in March 2021. This has allowed it to offer business loans to sellers who use Square's services.

=== 2022–present: Leadership change ===
In February 2023, Block reported that Square served 4 million merchant clients over January–December 2022. According to the company, its "larger business customers", identified by Square as generating more than $500,000 in annualized gross payment volume (GPV), made up 40% of its seller base in the third quarter of 2022. Sellers generating less than $125,000 in annualized GPV were said to be responsible for a slightly larger share of Square's 2022 mix than its mid-sized sellers (generating between $125,000 and $500,000 in annualized GPV).

On September 7–8, 2023, Square experienced a 14-hour long outage that left businesses unable to process customers' payments. The service recommended vendors switch to an offline mode to mitigate the issue, where the payments get processed once the network connectivity is re-established but were met with mixed results. Several days later, Square had determined that the disruption was caused by a misconfiguration in the Domain Naming System (DNS). Later in the month, Block said in a regulatory filing that the CEO of its Square business, Alyssa Henry, was set to leave the company in October 2023, and that Jack Dorsey would take on an additional role of "Square Head".

According to CNN in April 2024, Square was available in the United States, Australia, Canada, France, Japan, Republic of Ireland, Spain, and the United Kingdom. In February 2024, Block reported that its Square segment processed payments worth US$209.6 billion, while generating $7.03 billion in revenue and $3.13 billion in gross profit, for the year 2023. In May 2024, Square was found to be the market leader in point-of-sale systems for small businesses. It processed payments worth $228 billion over the year 2024, generating $7.68 billion in revenue.

In May 2025, Square introduced Square Handheld, a portable point-of-sale (POS) device designed for on-the-go and tableside transactions. The Handheld allows sellers to process card and contactless payments, manage inventory, and print receipts without needing a paired tablet or phone. In the same month, Square announced that it would begin to integrate Bitcoin payments via the Lightning network to merchants by 2026. The feature was first tested at the 2025 Bitcoin Conference with the intention of making Bitcoin "everyday money."

== Devices ==
=== Square Reader for magstripe ===
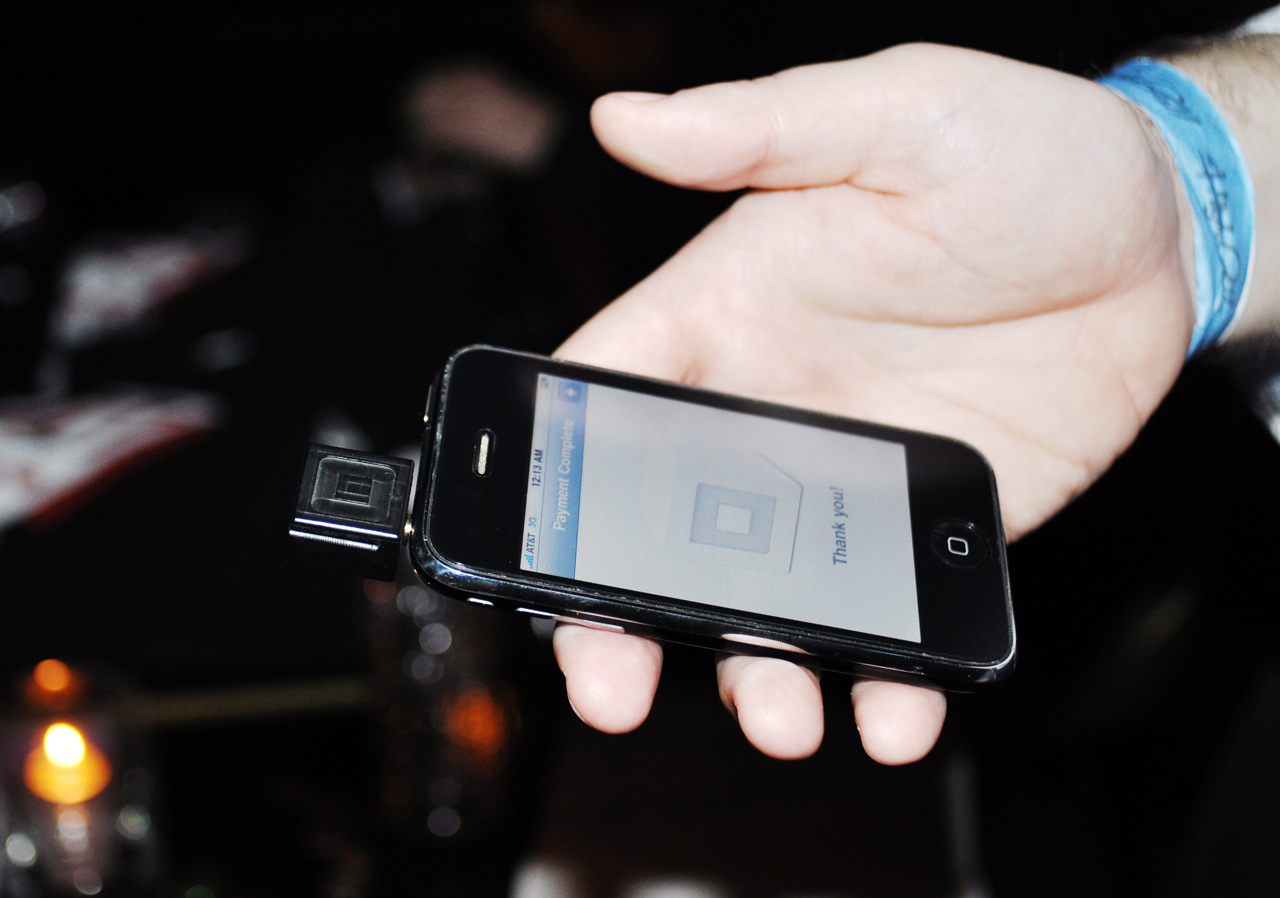
In 2010, the Square device was able to communicate with the Square app through the phone's audio jack.

The Square Reader was the firm's first product. It accepts credit card payments by connecting to a mobile device's audio jack. The original version consisted of a read head directly wired to a 3.5 mm audio jack, through which unencrypted, analog card information was fed to smartphones for amplification and digitization. Square Reader also supports Apple Lightning on post-2018 products.

Neither card numbers, nor magnetic stripe data, nor security codes are stored on Square devices. Square Reader is Payment Card Industry Data Security Standard (PCI) compliant and Verisign certified. Square provides its magnetic stripe card readers to sellers without charge. Square charges $99 for Square Stand and $59 for its chip-based Square Reader. The Square app is freely downloadable from the Apple App Store and the Google Play Store.

Square charges a fee of 2.6% plus $0.10 on every electronically scanned credit card transaction or 3.50% plus $0.15 per manually-entered transaction. No monthly or set-up fees are charged. The firm claims that its costs are, on average, lower than the costs charged by conventional credit card processors. Swiped payments are deposited directly into a seller's bank account within 1-2 business days. In some instances, Square withholds payments pending issues related to chargebacks. Square no longer returns fees for refunds or cancelled transitions (as of April 2023)

=== Square Reader for chip and contactless ===
Square Reader's bluetooth-connected reader allows Android and iOS devices to accept contactless and chip card payments.

=== Square Terminal ===
Square Terminal features a display, prints receipts, and accepts chip, swipe, and contactless payments. Unlike the basic card reader, it does not require a phone or tablet. It is more affordable than Square Register. It was designed to replace the older credit card terminals encountered in many stores. Square argued that these terminals often come with onerous contracts, and are not a positive experience for consumers. Terminal works with WiFi and is powered by an all-day battery, so it can be carried around the store and handed to customers.

=== Square Stand ===
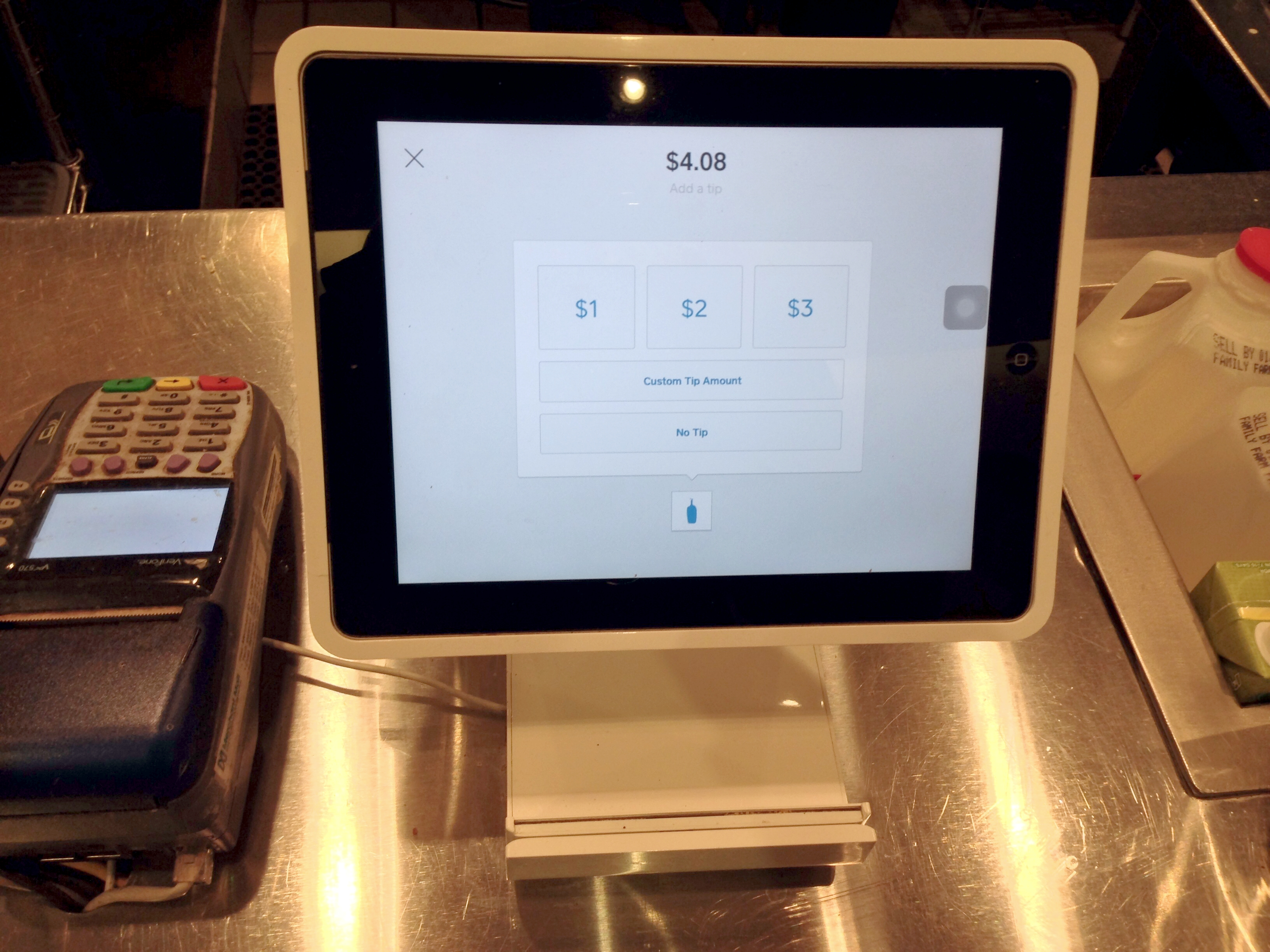
Square Stand at a coffee shop turned around for the customer to choose a tipping option

Square Stand turns the Apple iPad into a more complete point-of-sale system.

=== Square Register ===
Square Register is a standalone point-of-sale system. It consists of a merchant tablet and a customer tablet, with a built-in swipe, chip, and contactless reader.

== Services ==
Square provides sellers with e-Commerce and inventory capabilities, and also allows sellers to manage customer appointments. Square Payroll allows small business owners to process payroll. The product is available in the United States. It automatically handles withholding, payments, and tax filings. As of 2015, Square Payroll charges sellers a monthly fee of $20 plus $5 for each employee paid.

Square offers virtual and physical gift cards. A QR code is scanned to use the funds. Square Market, launched in 2013, enables businesses to accept online payments. Square Capital offers banking services and loan financing to merchants using Square. An online booking tool allows small businesses to accept appointments on their website, but does not accept restaurant reservations. Merchants can develop custom interfaces for the platform, via an application programming interface.

== Firearms ==
Square does not support firearms-related transactions. The company denied that this move was related to the debate over gun control in the United States.

== Controversies ==
In June 2019, The Wall Street Journal reported that Square inadvertently sent transaction receipts to the wrong email address, leading to adverse consequences such as outing one woman's impending divorce.

A Canadian food truck which sold Cuban coffee faced a loss of C$14,000 because transactions were processed through a Canadian subsidiary of Chase Manhattan Bank, contracted by Square to handle its Canadian accounts. As the parent company is governed by US laws, the bank would have been subject with charges of trafficking in prohibited Cuban goods if it had processed the fund transactions.

Square marks certain merchants as high risk, a designation that can come suddenly and without warning, and can result in a merchants account being terminated without explanation. Merchants classified as risky can have 20-30% of their funds withheld to handle chargebacks and disputes. Square received criticism from affected merchants due to the opaque nature of the process, its suddenness, and difficulties in appealing the designation.

== See also ==
- PayPal
- Stripe, Inc.
