= Nicolas Huss =

French businessman (born 1964)

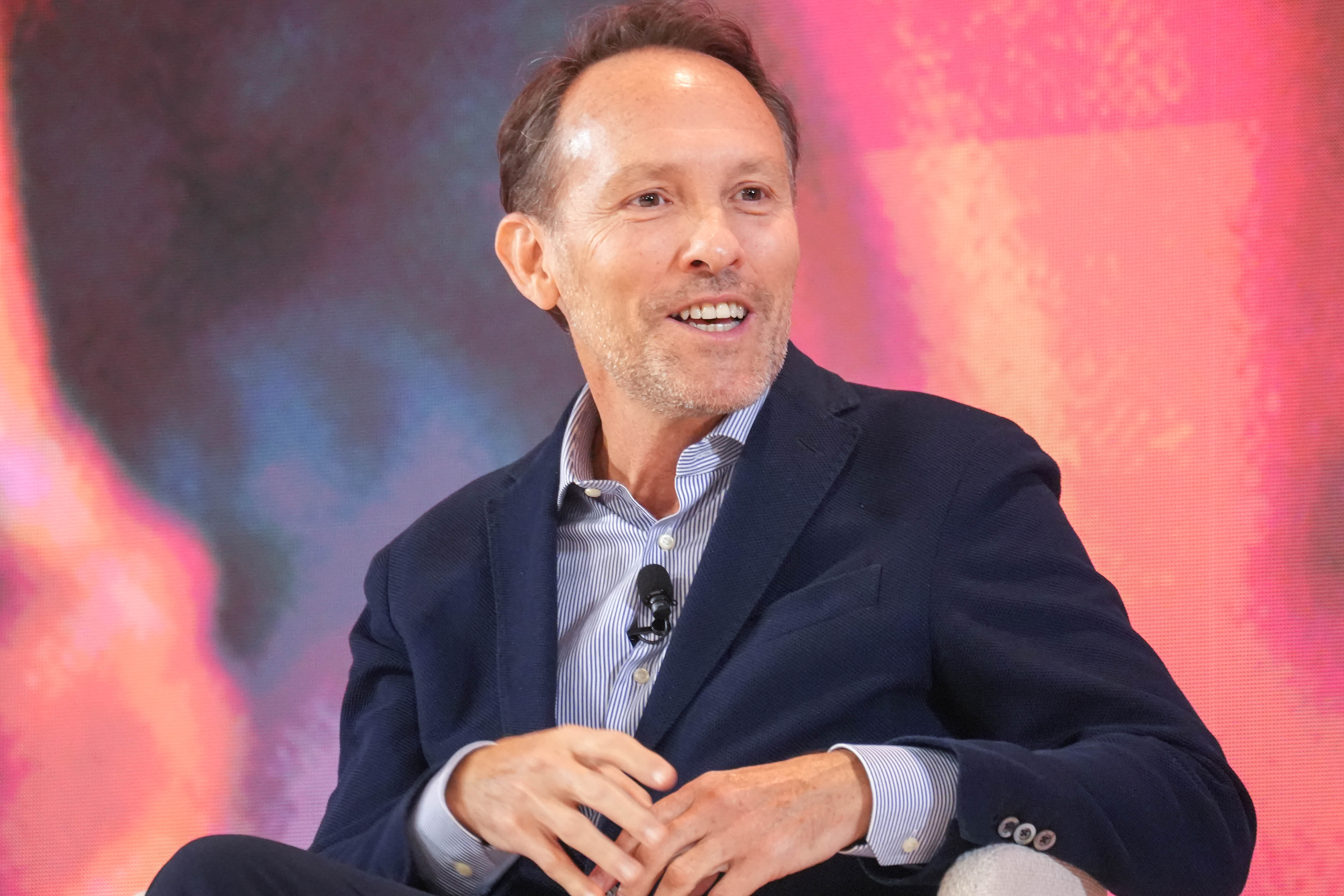
- Huss in November 2022
- Born: 27 August 1964 (age 61)
- Education: Sciences Po Toulouse
- Title: CEO of Hotelbeds from may 2021 till now

Nicolas Huss (born 27 August 1964) is a French businessman, and previous chief executive officer of Ingenico Group.

== Early life and education ==
He was born in Nice in the Provence-Alpes-Côte d'Azur.

He graduated from the Institut d'études politiques de Toulouse in 1987: he went to Sciences Po Toulouse, part of the University of Toulouse, from 1984 to 1987 where he gained a LLB degree in law, later gaining a MA in political science and government.

== Career ==
In 2015 he became chief executive of Visa Europe, taking over from Peter Ayliffe.

In July 2017, he became vice president of strategy and performance at Ingenico, reporting to the chairman and CEO Philippe Lazare. In November 2018, he became CEO of Ingenico, taking over from Philippe Lazare

He joined the board of directors of Amadeus IT Group on 15 June 2017.

== Personal life ==
As well as French, he speaks English and Spanish.

Business positions
Preceded by Peter Ayliffe	Chief Executive of Visa Europe -	Succeeded by Incumbent
