= Bambora =

Swedish payment service provider

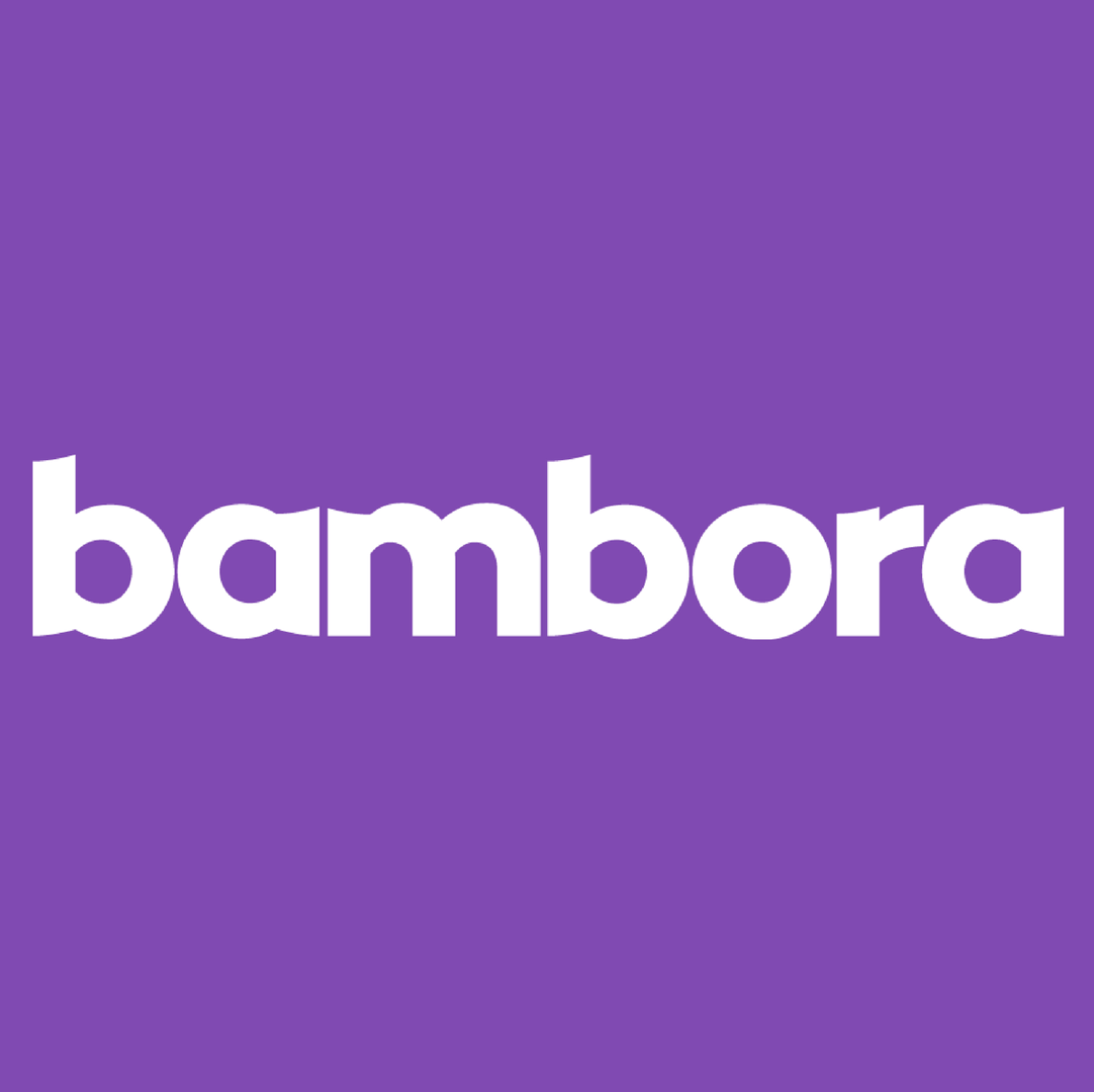
- Formerly: Cidron Superpay
- Type: Private company
- Industry: Financial services
- Founded: 2014; 12 years ago in Stockholm, Sweden
- Founders: Johan Tjarnberg
- Defunct: 2020
- Fate: Merged
- Successor: Worldline SA
- Headquarters: Stockholm, Sweden
- Parent: Ingenico
- Website: www.bambora.com

Bambora, is a Swedish-headquartered payment service provider formed in 2015 through the combination of Euroline, Beanstream, Keycorp, and IP Payments. Bambora provides payment processing, POS terminals, and merchant acquiring services. Bambora initially operated in Sweden, Canada, the US, and Australia.

Bambora later expanded into New Zealand, Norway, and the United Kingdom with subsequent smaller acquisitions in 2016. Bambora was itself acquired by French-based Ingenico in 2017 for $1.7B euros. In 2020, Ingenico merged with Worldline SA.

== History ==
Cidron Superpay was founded in 2014 in Stockholm, Sweden, by Johan Tjarnberg with funding from Nordic Capital. Cidron is Nordic spelled backwards. The intent was to create a global payments company, through acquisition, to compete against industry leaders such as Global Collect, Adyen, and PayPal. Johan had successfully led a previous payments company, Point, in its growth and subsequent sale to Verifone in 2011.

In 2015 Cidron Superpay rebranded as Bambora and began acquiring global payments companies in an effort to integrate their various products and services and offer them at scale to a much broader range of customers.

Between 2015 and 2017, Bambora acquired 14 companies in Europe, North America, and Australia/New Zealand. Of those acquisitions, Euroline, Beanstream, Keycorp and IP Payments were the largest, with the CEOs of Beanstream and Keycorp subsequently joining Bambora's leadership team. Acquired companies were rebranded as Bambora, but local offices and management, for the most part, remained intact.

In 2017, Bambora was acquired by Ingenico Group of France for $1.7B euros. Ingenico later merged with Worldline SA in late 2020.

In the fall of 2025, Wordline announced its intent to sell Bambora NA (the prior Beanstream business) to Shift4. Bambora NA was referenced as having approximately 140K merchants and 500 software ISVs. On 2 March 2026, Shift4 closed the acquisition.

== See also ==
- PCI DSS
- Payment gateway
- Accounts Receivable
- Electronic Bill Presentment and Payment
