= Gilles Grapinet =

French public servant and businessman (born 1963)

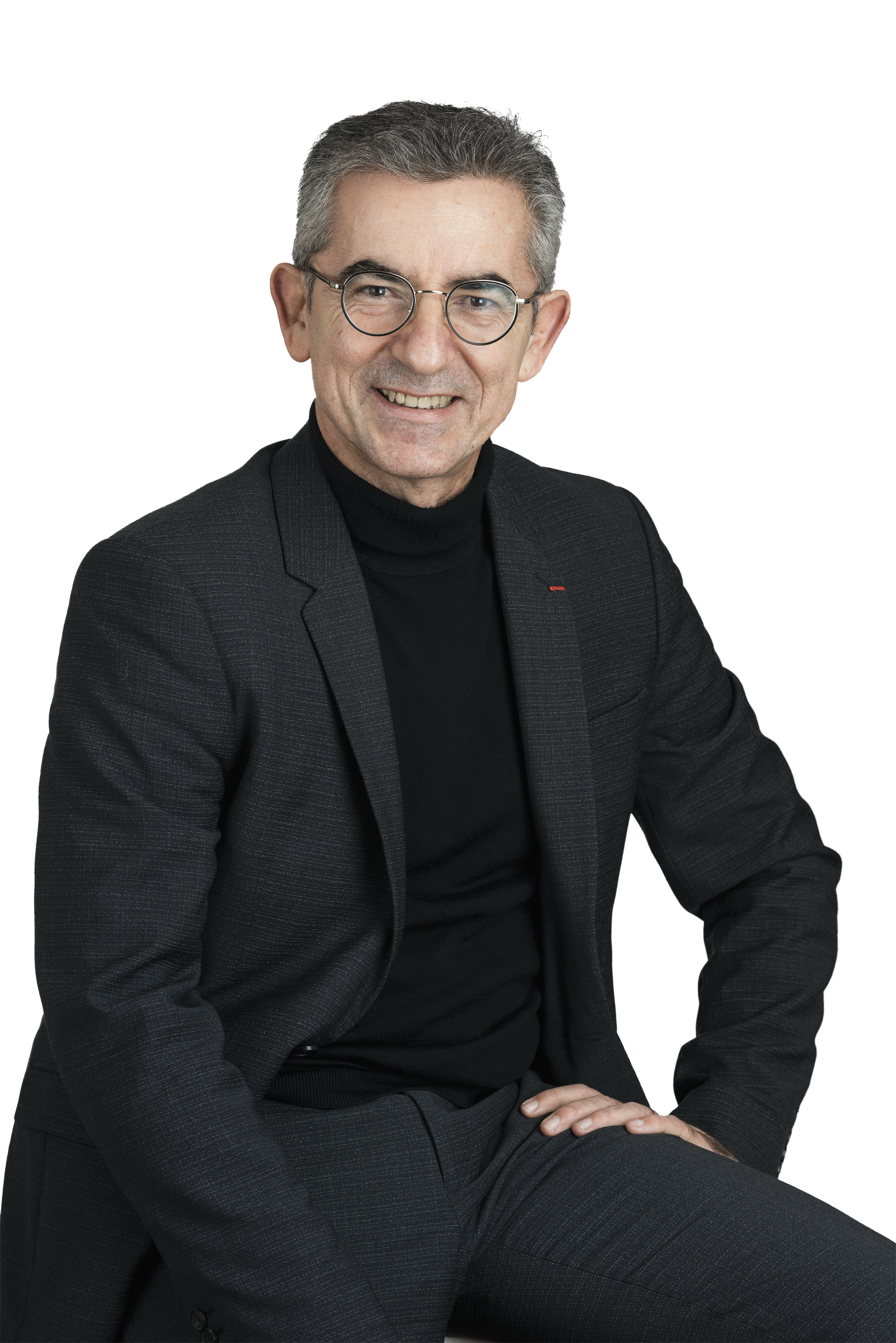
- Gilles Grapinet, 2021
- Born: 3 July 1963 (age 62); Aix-en-Provence (France)
- Education: École nationale d'administration (ENA)

Gilles Grapinet (born 3 July 1963) is a French public servant and businessman.

He was the CEO of Worldline.

== Education ==
Having studied at the Prytanee National Militaire de La Flèche (Sarthe), he obtained a Master's Degree in public law from the University of Aix-Marseille before joining the École nationale d'administration (ENA) in 1990.

Upon graduating from the ENA in 1992 (Condorcet class), he became French Inspecteur Général des Finances.

== Career ==
=== Public servant ===
In 1996, he joined the French Tax Directorate where he was responsible in particular for management control, then strategy and information system.

From 2000 to 2002, he directed the Copernic program, a service with national jurisdiction aiming at overhauling and simplifying IT for the tax activities of the French Ministry of Economy and Finance

In 2003, he joined the cabinet of the French Prime Minister Jean-Pierre Raffarin, as an advisor for economic and financial affairs. In 2004, he was appointed chief of staff to the Minister of Economy Hervé Gaymard, a position which he kept after Mr Gaymard's resignation. He was Thierry Breton's chief of staff until April 2007.

=== Businessman ===
In May 2007, he took over as interim director of the French National Audit Office before joining Crédit Agricole's general management as head of strategy.

In 2009, he became deputy CEO of the Atos Group. Concurrently, in 2014, he oversaw the IPO of Atos' payment business, Worldline, of which he became CEO a year before.

In 2015, he brought together Worldline and the Dutch company Equens to give birth to the European leader in online payment.

In May 2018, he led for Worldline the acquisition of SIX Payment Services, the payment services division of the Swiss Group SIX, for an amount of 2.3 billion euros financed mainly by the issuing of new shares. With the integration of the 1,600 employees of SIX Payment Services and its merchant acquisition activities and services serving more than 200,000 merchants for an income of around 530 million euros, Worldline achieved a 30% increase in its turnover as well as a number one position in Switzerland, Austria and Luxembourg. Worldline's ambition through this transaction was to create a European payment champion.

In April 2019, following the announcement by Atos of the distribution of approximately 23.5% of the share capital of Worldline to its shareholders, he led the exit of Worldline from the consolidation scope of the Atos group, thus giving the company its new fully autonomous status.

In February 2020, he announced the proposed public offer for all Ingenico shares, which would create, at the close of the transaction, the fourth largest player worldwide in the payment services sector with around 20,000 employees in 50 countries.

Under his leadership, Worldline entered the CAC40, the flagship index of the French stock exchange, at the end of February 2020. This mainly reflects the evolution of the Group's liquidity and capitalisation from 2.2B Euros at the time of its listing on the French stock exchange in June 2014 to more than 11B Euros when it entered the CAC40.

He is also at the origin of the creation of EDPIA (the European Digital Payment Industry Alliance), a professional organisation bringing together the main European Payments Services Providers (Ingenico, Nets, Nexi and Worldline) with the objective to better express the voice of all players from this industry to the European authorities and other stakeholders from the payments ecosystem. He is its first President.

In October 2020, Grapinet announced that Worldline had closed the acquisition of Ingenico, a financial services company that facilitates secure electronic transactions.

In November 2020, Gilles Grapinet joined Younited Credit, one of the largest Fintechs in Europe, as Chairman of the Supervisory Board, with the aim of supporting the Next40 Fintech in its international and technological development.

End of September 2024, Gilles Grapinet left Worldline.
