= Bankcard =

Australian credit card, 1974–2006

- Type: credit card
- Manufacturer: Bankcard Association of Australia
- Available: No
- Website: bankcard.com.au at the Wayback Machine (archived 2005-02-08)

Bankcard was a shared brand credit card issued by financial institutions in Australia and New Zealand between 1974 and 2006. It was managed by the Bankcard Association of Australia, a joint venture of Australia's largest banks, and was the nation's first mass market credit card.

Before 1974, only store cards, Diners Club and American Express were available in Australia and these were either restrictive or only accessible to the wealthy.

In the first decade after its introduction, Bankcard dominated the Australian credit card market, with more than five million cardholders at its peak in 1984. As a result of a declining cardholder base, falling transaction volumes and shrinking market share in relation to internationally accepted credit cards such as Visa and Mastercard, the card was withdrawn from use in 2006.

== History ==
Before Bankcard, the relatively small population of Australia, coupled with its vast geographical spread made a credit card system cost prohibitive for any single Australian bank. In the beginning of the 1970s, a number of banks combined to seek approval from the Reserve Bank of Australia and the Australian Federal Treasury to commence a credit card scheme in the Australian financial market.

Approval was granted in 1972. The banks formed a company, Charge Card Services Limited, to manage Bankcard and process credit card transactions. Each member bank issued its own variant of the Bankcard card and each established its own credit rules and maintained direct customer relations with its own cardholders. Bankcard was officially launched in October 1974 by then Prime Minister of Australia, Gough Whitlam.

A significant marketing campaign followed the card's launch. This included what was then the biggest direct mail marketing campaign in Australia to date. Among other things, banks posted a card with a A$300 credit limit to potential clients, following analysis of their accounts. In December 1974, David Jones became the first major retailing organisation to accept Bankcard and by 1976, the card was accepted by almost every Australian department chain.

Within 18 months of the card's issue, there were more than one million cardholders, representing more than 6% of the Australian population. 1983 saw the expansion of Bankcard to New Zealand. By 1984, there were more than five million cardholders in Australia and New Zealand. In April 1986, there was a dispute between the banks as to whether Bankcard would be included in the then new electronic banking EFTPOS system.

At the time, the Commonwealth Bank and Westpac were heavily promoting Mastercard and providing only minimal support to the Bankcards they issued, while the ANZ Bank, National Australia Bank and state banks all supported Bankcard. The banks came to an accord whereby magnetic strips would be placed on all Bankcards, allowing them to be used in the EFTPOS system.

== Withdrawal ==
By the beginning of 2006, the number of cardholders had declined to around one million. Popularity of the card had declined as other credit card options became available. Bankcard was significantly limited by its lack of acceptance outside Australia and New Zealand. Despite this, Bankcard continued to generate profits for member banks, largely because the elderly demographic of cardholders had a low incidence of default.

In February 2006, however, the Bankcard Association of Australia announced that it would phase out Bankcard by the end of that year, citing the exceptional growth of credit card operations and improvements in technology allowing member banks to perform their own data capture and processing in house. Existing cardholders were offered alternative credit cards by their issuing banks.

At the time of this announcement, the National Australia Bank remained the only bank still issuing Bankcard. Westpac and the Commonwealth Bank had stopped issuing the card in June and December 2005 respectively. Merchants within Australia were able to accept Bankcards until the end of 2006. Bankcard operations were closed in New Zealand in October 2005.

== Cultural impact ==
Bankcard was the first widely available credit card issued by Australian banks for general consumption. Banks actively sought to educate consumers on how to use credit cards and it "revolutionised" the way Australian consumers paid for goods and services. According to Gregory Melleuish, the introduction of Bankcard helped accelerate the process of establishing consumerism in Australia.

On the withdrawal of Bankcard in February 2006, retailer Gerry Harvey stated that the credit card had "inspired, or enabled, more people to buy on credit and all retailers' sales improved." Supriya Singh, a professor at RMIT, argued that the introduction of Bankcard marked the beginning of Australia's transformation to virtual money. The availability of credit cards in Australia after 1974, together with wider financial deregulation, resulted in significant increases in household indebtedness.

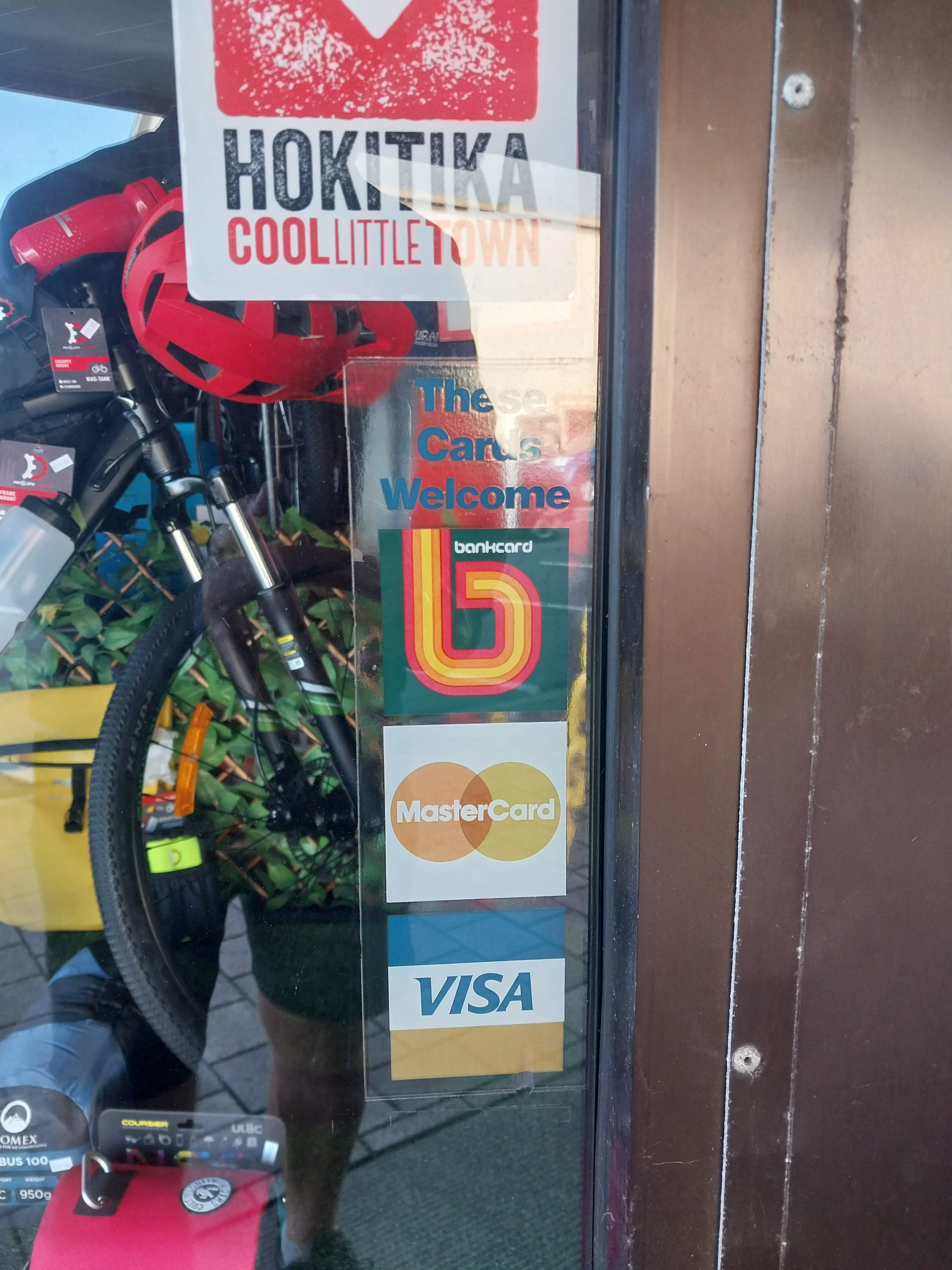
Bankcard logo shown on a shop window sticker as an accepted credit card in Hokitika in 2025.

As late as 2025, Bankcard could still be occasionally seen on stickers on shop fronts in both Australia and New Zealand.
