= TRANZ 330 =

- Manufacturer: VeriFone
- Type: General-purpose Point of Sale (POS) device
- Operating system: Proprietary VeriFone TCL
- CPU: Zilog Z80
- Display: 16-character vacuum fluorescent display
- Input: Card reader, two serial ports, optional bar code or PIN pad device
- Touchpad: 16-key numeric keypad
- Connectivity: Modem (300/1200 baud), two serial ports
- Power: 9VAC, 1A

The TRANZ 330 is a popular point-of-sale device manufactured by VeriFone in 1985. The most common application for these units is bank and credit card processing, however, as a general purpose computer, they can perform other novel functions. Other applications include gift/benefit card processing, prepaid phone cards, payroll and employee timekeeping, and even debit and ATM cards. They are programmed in a proprietary VeriFone TCL language (Terminal Control Language), which is unrelated to the Tool Command Language used in UNIX environments.
