= Philippe Lazare =

French businessman (born 1956)

- Born: October 30, 1956 (age 68); Neuilly-sur-Seine, France
- Occupation: Business executive
- Known for: Former Chief Executive Officer of Ingenico
- Awards: French Legion of Honour

Philippe Lazare (born October 30, 1956) is a French business executive. He is a non-executive advisor of Groupe FDJ. He was previously the chief executive officer of Ingenico, an electronic payment solutions company.

== Education ==
Lazare trained as an architect at Ecole Supérieure d’Architecture de Paris-La Défense. He left the university with a diploma in Architecture.

== Career ==
Lazare was appointed managing director of Ingenico on July 17, 2007, after working as a director since 2005. He became chief executive officer following the decision by the company's Board of Directors on January 20, 2010.

== Interest ==
Philippe Lazare has been frequently involved in promoting culture and innovation in business through conferences (employer organization MEDEF conferences, Rencontres Economiques d'Aix en Provence).

== Recognition ==
He is a Knight of the French Legion of Honour.

In December 2012, the magazine Challenges rated him number one in the Top 10 most successful business leaders (excluding CAC40 businesses). This rating concerns companies with over 1 billion Euros in sales, based on average annual and relative results between 2009 and 2011 in terms of growth, profitability, and stock market performance.

In June 2013, Mr. Lazare was rated second in the "Telecom/IT/hardware" European Extel Survey. This survey, conducted in March and May 2013 among managers and financial analysts, rates the quality of financial communication among listed European companies.
