= EFTPOS =

Type of payment system

Electronic funds transfer at point of sale (EFTPOS; /ˈɛf(t)pɒs/) is a type of payment transaction in which electronic funds transfers (EFT) are processed at a point of sale (POS) system or payment terminal usually via payment methods such as payment cards (debit cards, credit cards or gift cards). EFTPOS technology was developed during the 1980s.

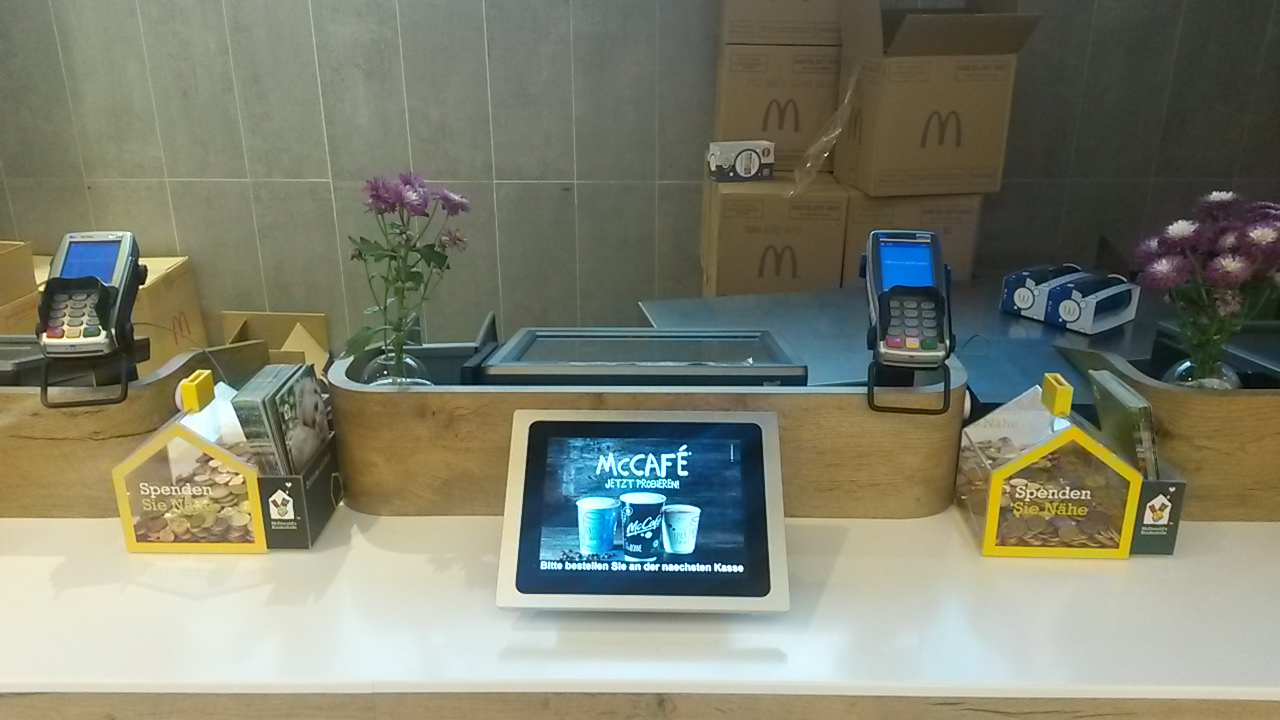
Pin pad and touchscreen EFTPOS terminal

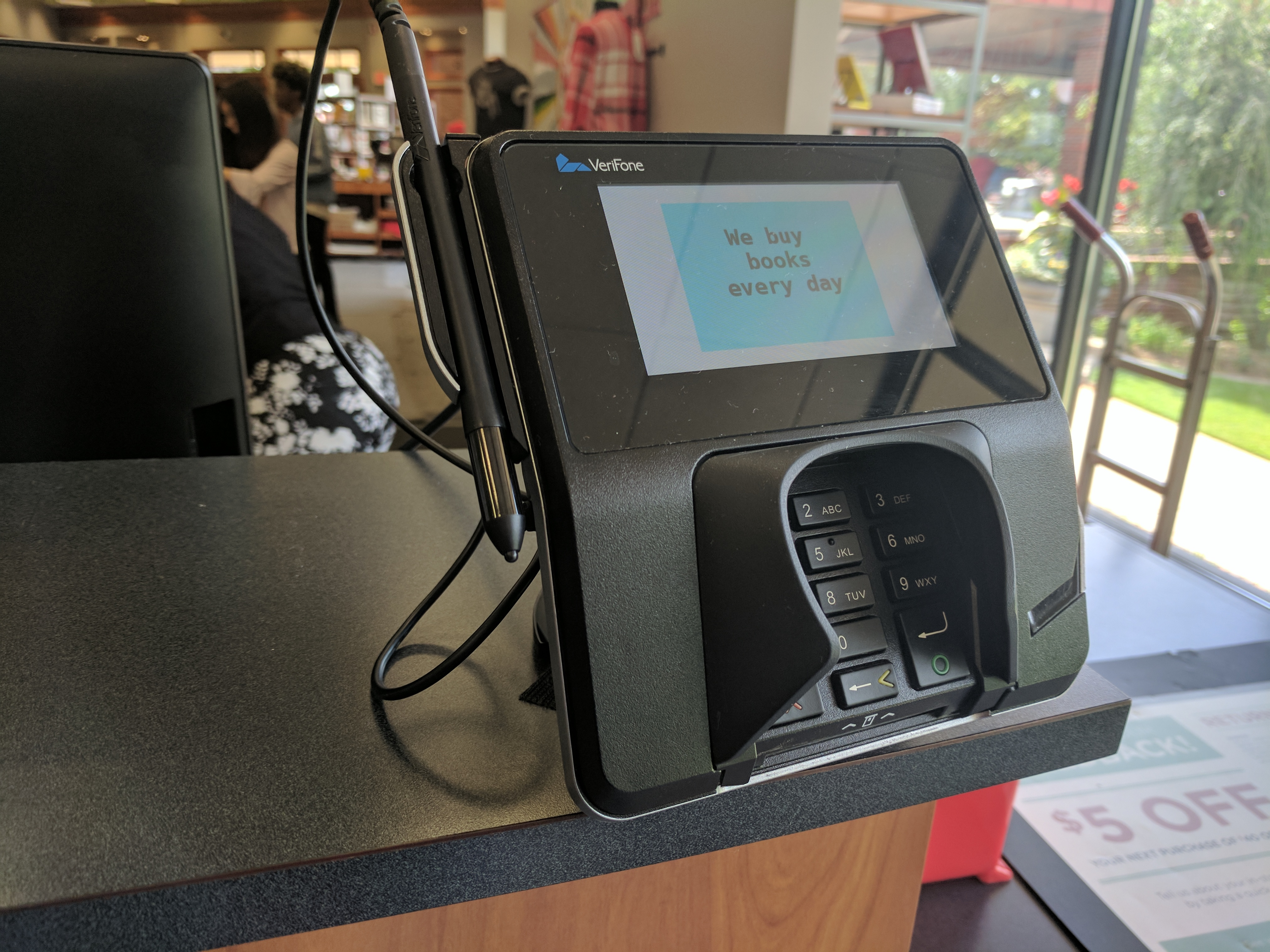
Modern EFTPOS terminal

== As a payment network ==
In Australia and New Zealand, EFTPOS is also the brand name for the interbank electronic payment system network used for facilitating EFTPOS types of payments. Other countries use different brand names for their EFTPOS systems, such as NETS in Singapore or Interlink in the United States. Since the early 2010s, country specific EFTPOS systems have been overtaken by global EMV based systems with contactless payments or QR code payment systems.

The payment cards used by EFTPOS systems are plastic cards complying with ISO/IEC 7810 ID-1 standard that have a bank card number conforming with the ISO/IEC 7812 numbering standard.

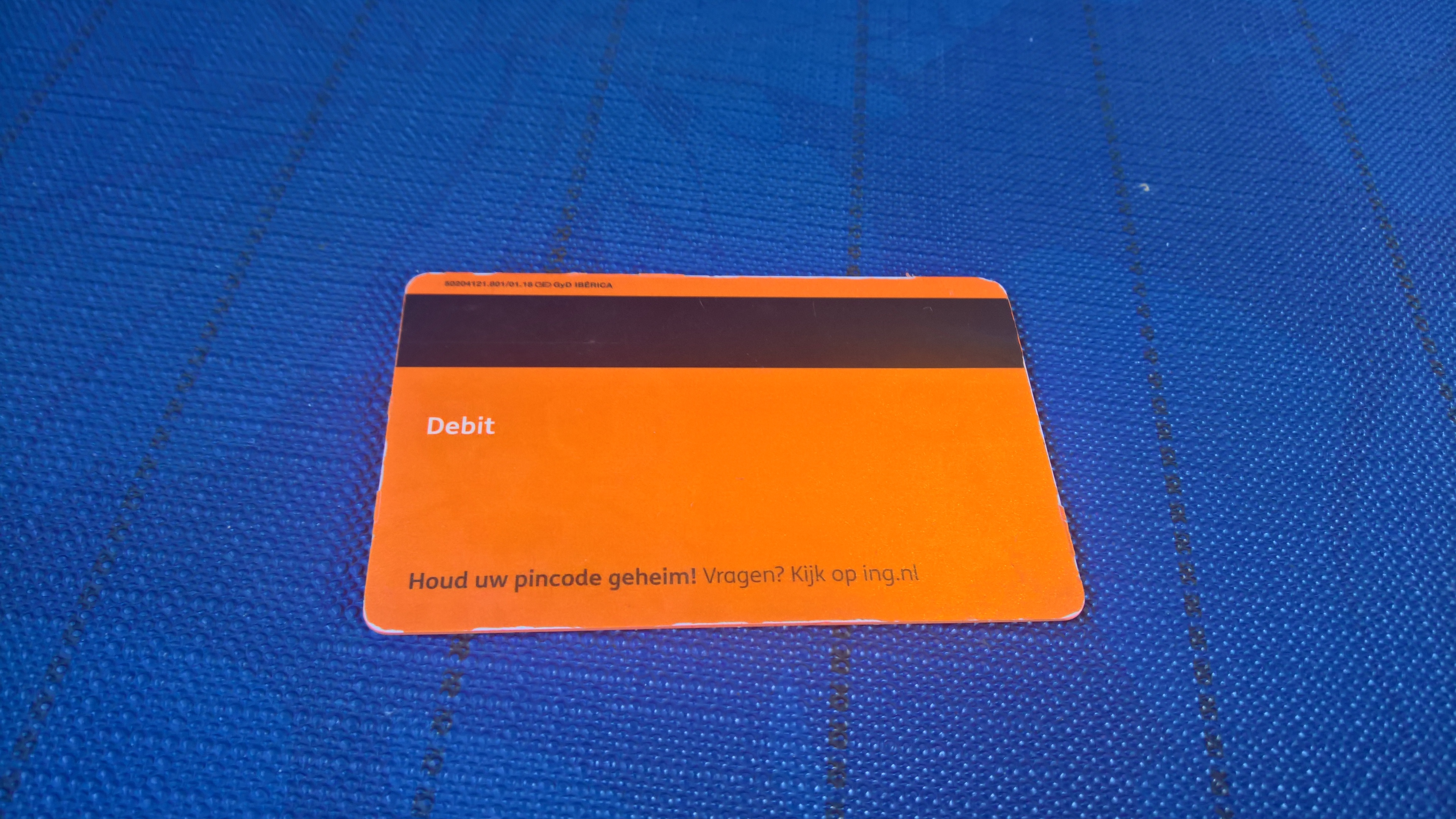
EFTPOS magnetic stripe card

== History ==
EFTPOS technology originated in the United States in 1981 and was rolled out in 1982. Initially, a number of nationwide systems were set up, such as Interlink, which were limited to participating correspondent banking relationships, not being linked to each other. Consumers and merchants were slow to accept it, and there was minimal marketing. As a result, growth and market penetration of EFTPOS was minimal in the US up to the turn of the century.

In a short time, other countries adopted the EFTPOS technology, these systems were limited to the national borders. Each country adopted various interbank co-operative models.

In Australia, in 1984 Westpac was the first major Australian bank to implement an EFTPOS system, at BP petrol stations. In New Zealand that same year Bank of New Zealand was the first bank to introduce an EFTPOS system, initially at Shell petrol stations. The other major banks in Australia implemented EFTPOS systems during 1984, initially with petrol stations. The banks' existing debit and credit cards (but only allowed to access debit accounts) were used in the EFTPOS systems.

In 1985, the State Bank of Victoria developed the capacity to host connect individual ATMs and helped create the ATM (Financial) Network. Banks started to link their EFTPOS systems to provide access for all customers across all EFTPOS devices. Cards issued by all banks could then be used at all EFTPOS terminals nationally, but debit cards issued in other countries could not.

Prior to 1986, the Australian banks organised a widespread uniform credit card, called Bankcard, which had been in existence since 1974. There was a dispute between the banks whether Bankcard (or credit cards in general) should be permitted into the proposed EFTPOS system. At that time several banks were actively promoting MasterCard and Visa credit cards. Store cards and proprietary cards were shut out of the new system.

Since 2002, the use of EFTPOS has grown significantly, and it has become the standard payment method, displacing the use of cash. Subsequently, networks facilitating the process of money transfer and payment settlement between the consumer and the merchant grew from a small number of nationwide systems to the majority of payment processing transactions. For EFTPOS, USA-based systems allow the use of debit cards or credit cards.

== Australia ==
Australian eftpos logo

In Australia, eftpos is the name of a proprietary domestic debit payment system launched in the 1980s, owned by eftpos Payments Australia Limited (ePAL) (now Australian Payments Network) that accepts bankcards or debit cards at POS "point of sale"" terminals, ATMs and most recently, online via eCommerce. In 2021, eftpos joined BPAY Group and NPP Australia under Australian Payments Plus following ACCC authorisation of the amalgamation.

Not all merchants provide EFTPOS facilities, but those who wish to accept EFTPOS payments must enter an agreement with one of the many (originally seven) merchant service providers, which rent an EFTPOS terminal to the merchant. ePal also sets the EFTPOS interchange fee. For credit cards to be accepted by a merchant a separate agreement must be entered into with each credit card company, each of which has its own flexible merchant fee rate. Eftpos machines for merchants are provided by larger banks and specialists such as Live eftpos.

The clearing arrangements for EFTPOS are managed by Australian Payments Clearing Association. The system for ATM and EFTPOS interchanges is called Issuers and Acquirers Community (formerly Consumer Electronic Clearing System; CECS) also called CS3. CECS required authorisations from the Australian Competition & Consumer Commission (ACCC), which was obtained in 2001 and reaffirmed in 2009. ATM and EFTPOS clearances are the made under individual bilateral arrangements between the institutions involved.

=== Debit cards ===
Australian financial institutions provide their customers with a plastic card, which can be used as a debit card or as an ATM card, and sometimes as a credit card. The card merely provides the means by which a customer's linked bank or other accounts can be accessed using an EFTPOS terminal or ATM. These cards can also be used on some vending machines and other automatic payment mechanisms, such as ticket vending machines.

Each Australian bank has given a different name to its debit cards, such as:

- Commonwealth Bank: Keycard
- Westpac: Handycard
- National Australia Bank: FlexiCard
- ANZ Bank: Access card
- Bendigo Bank: Easy Money card
- St George/Bank of Melbourne/BankSA: FreedomCard
- Qudos Bank, Queensland Police Credit Union, Dnister and Indue sponsored financial institutions: Cue Card
- People's Choice Credit Union, Bank Australia, Credit Union SA, Beyond Bank, Teachers Mutual Bank, Nexus Mutual, and Cuscal sponsored financial institutions: rediCARD
- Suncorp Bank: eftpos Card
- Regional Australia Bank: Access card

Some banks offer alternative debit card facilities to their customers using the Visa or MasterCard clearance system. For example, St George Bank offers a Visa Debit Card, as does the National Australia Bank. The main difference with regular debit cards is that these cards can be used outside Australia where the respective credit card is accepted.

Those merchants that enter the EFTPOS payment system must accept debit cards issued by any Australian bank, and some also accept various credit cards and other cards. Some merchants set minimum transaction amounts for EFTPOS transactions, which can be different for debit and credit card transactions. Some merchants impose a surcharge on the use of EFTPOS. These can vary between merchants and on the type of card being used, and generally are not imposed on debit card transactions, and widely not on MasterCard and Visa credit card transactions.

A feature of a debit card is that an EFTPOS transaction will only be accepted if there is an available credit balance in the bank cheque or savings account linked to the card.

Australian debit cards normally cannot be used outside Australia. They can only be used outside Australia if they carry the MasterCard/Maestro/Cirrus or Visa/Plus or other similar logos, in which case the non-Australian transaction will be processed through those transaction systems. Similarly, non-Australian debit and credit cards can only be used at Australian EFTPOS terminals or ATMs if they have these logos or the MasterCard or Visa logos. Diners Club and/or American Express cards will be accepted only if the merchant has an agreement with those card companies, or increasingly if the merchant has modern alternative payment options available for those cards, such as through PayPal. The Discover Card is accepted in Australia as a Diners Club card.

In addition, credit card companies issue prepaid cards which act like generic gift cards, which are anonymous and not linked to any bank accounts. These cards are accepted by merchants who accept credit cards and are processed through the EFTPOS terminal in the same way as credit cards.

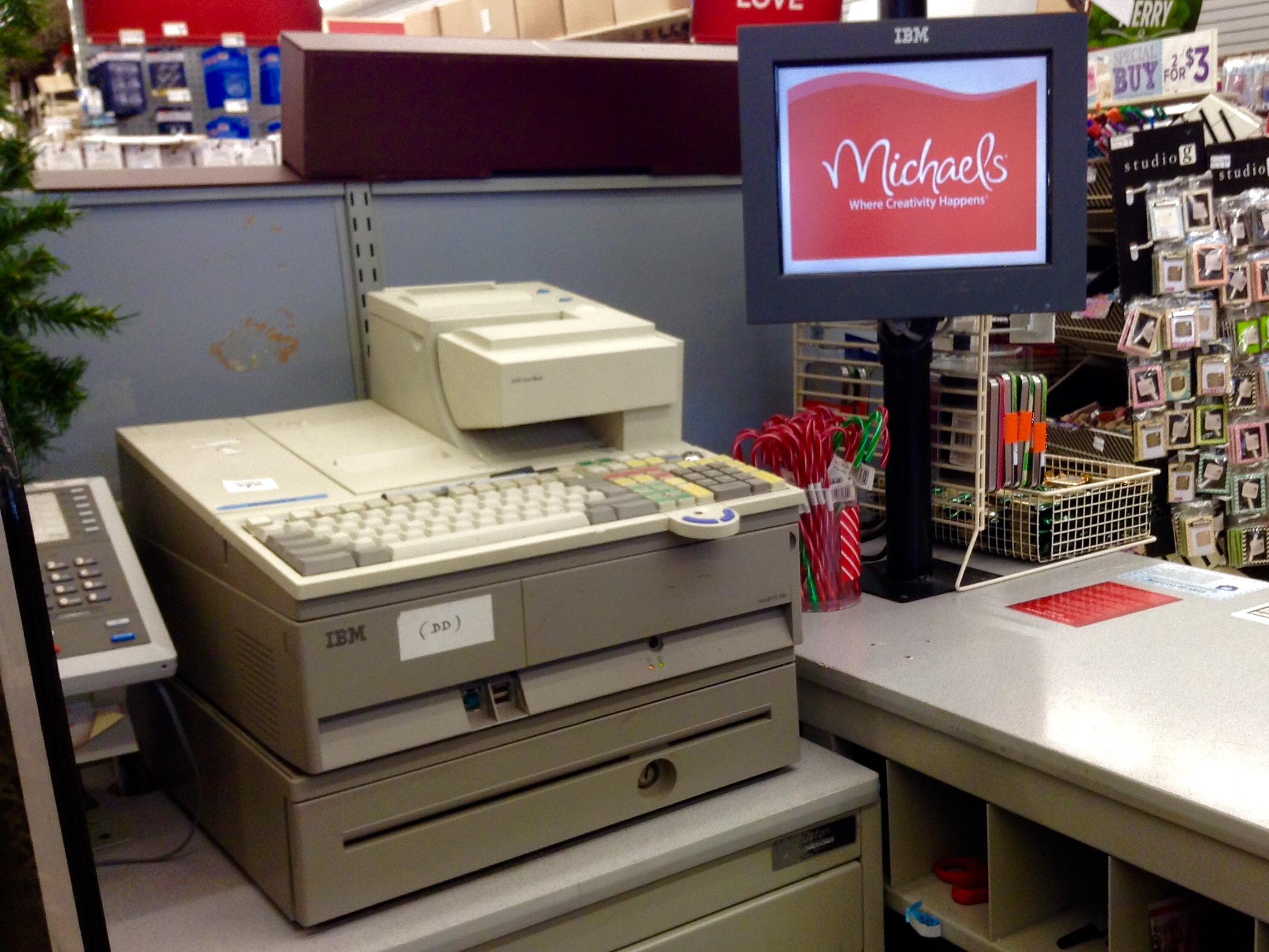
IBM POS terminal

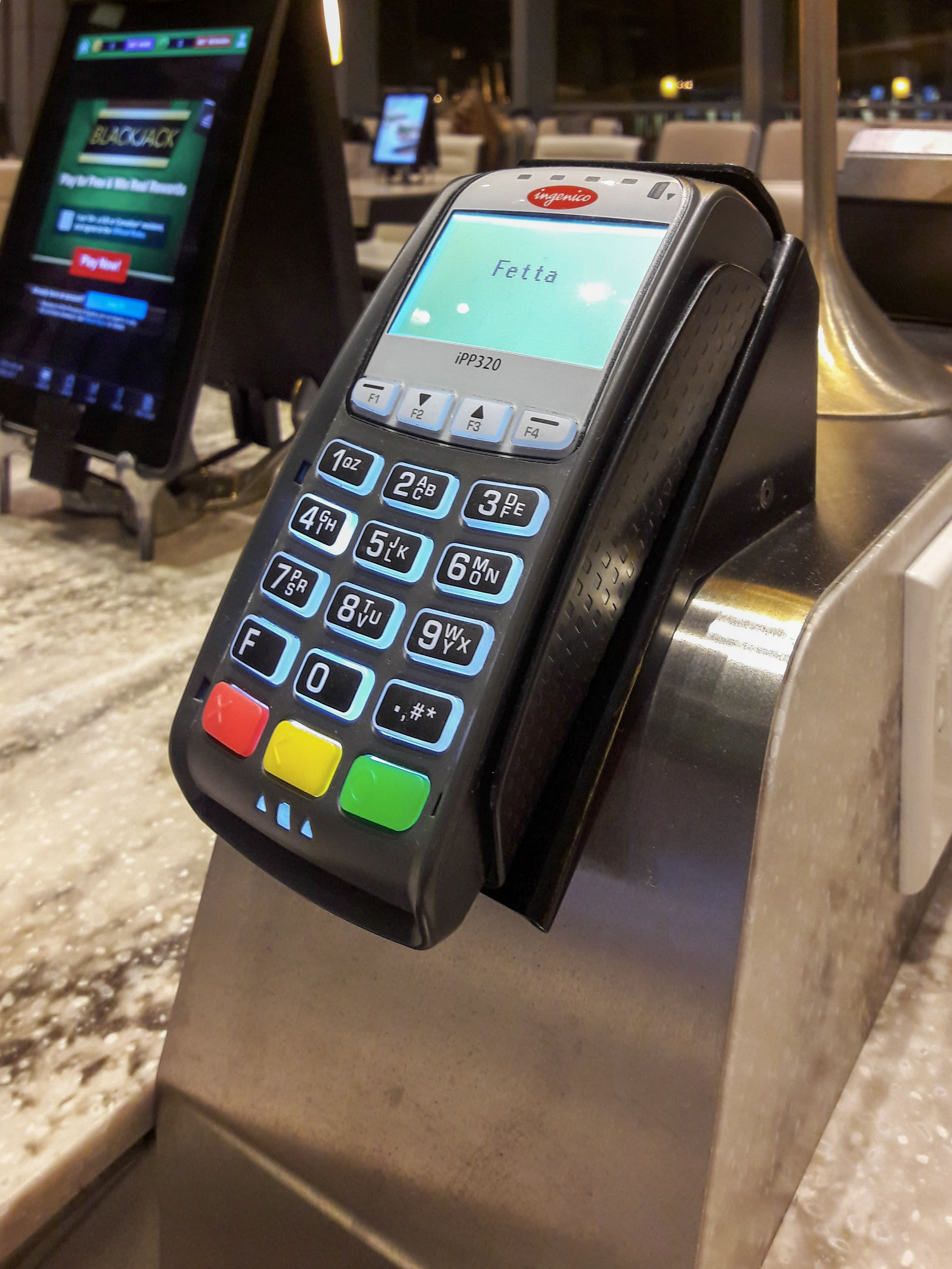
EFTPOS terminal in a restaurant

=== Cash out ===
A number of merchants permit customers using a debit card to withdraw cash as part of the EFTPOS transaction. In Australia, this facility (known as debit card cashback in many other countries) is known as "cash out". For the merchant, cash out is a way of reducing their net cash takings, saving on banking of cash. There is no additional cost to the merchant in providing cash out because banks charge a merchant a debit card transaction fee per EFTPOS transaction, and not on the transaction value. Cash out is a facility provided by the merchant, and not the bank, so the merchant can limit or vary how much cash can be withdrawn at a time, or suspend the facility at any time. When available, cash out is convenient for the customer, who can bypass having to visit a bank branch or ATM. Cash out is also cheaper for the customer, since only one bank transaction is involved. For people in some remote areas, cash out may be the only way they can withdraw cash from their personal accounts. However, most merchants who provide the facility set a relatively low limit on cash out, generally $50, and some also charge for the service. Some merchants in Australia only allow cash out with the purchase of goods; other merchants allow cash out whether or not customers buy any goods. Cash out is not available in association with credit card sales because on credit card transactions the merchant is charged a percentage commission based on the transaction value, and also because cash withdrawals are treated differently from purchase transactions by the credit card company. (However, though inconsistent with a merchant's agreement with each credit card company, the merchant may treat a cash withdrawal as part of an ordinary credit card sale.)

=== Cardholder verification ===
EFTPOS transactions involving a debit, credit or prepaid card are primarily authenticated via the entry of a personal identification number (PIN) at the point of sale. Historically, these transactions were authenticated by the merchant using the cardholder's signature, as signed on their receipt. However, merchants had become increasingly lax in enforcing this verification, resulting in an increase in fraud. Australian banks have since deployed chip and PIN technology using the global EMV card standard; as of 1 August 2014, Australian merchants no longer accept signatures on transactions by domestic customers at point of sale terminals.

As a further security measure, if a user enters an incorrect PIN three times, the card may be locked out of EFTPOS and require reactivation over the phone or at a bank branch. In the case of an ATM, the card will not be returned, and the cardholder will need to visit the branch to retrieve the card, or request a new card to be issued.

All debit cards now have a magnetic stripe on which is encoded the card's service codes, consisting of three-digit values. These codes are used to convey instructions to merchant terminals on how a card should be processed. The first digit indicates if a card can be used internationally or is valid for domestic use only. It is also used to signal if the card is chip-enabled. The second digit indicates if the transaction must be sent online for authorisation always or if transactions that are below floor limit can take place without authorisation. The third digit is used to indicate the preferred card verification method (e.g., PIN) and the environment where the card can be used (e.g., at point of sale only). Merchant terminals are required to recognise and act on service codes or send all transactions for online authorisation.

=== Contactless smart card ===
In the late 2000s, MasterCard and Visa introduced contactless smart debit cards under the brand names MasterCard PayPass and Visa payWave. These payments are made using either electronic payment networks separate from the regular EFTPOS payment networks, or newer EFTPOS with tap sensors, and is an alternative to the previous swipe or chip systems. These networks are operated by MasterCard and Visa, and not by the banks as is the EFTPOS network, through EFTPOS Payments Australia Limited (ePAL).

These cards are based on EMV technology and contain a RFID chip and antenna loop embedded in the plastic of the card. To pay using this system, a customer passes the card within 4 cm of a reader at a merchant checkout. Using this method, for transactions under a specified limit, the customer does not need to authenticate their identity by PIN entry or signature, as on a regular EFTPOS machine. For transactions over the above limit, PIN verification is required.

The facility is only available for cards branded with the MasterCard PayPass or Visa payWave logos, indicating that they have the system-permitted embedded chip. ANZ launched an ATM solution based on Visa payWave in 2015, where the customer taps the card on a reader installed at the ATM and inserts their PIN to finalise cash withdrawals. Since 2018, these ATMs work with Apple Pay and Google Pay as well, where a customer taps their NFC-enabled phone instead of their card. Bank debit cards and other credit cards do not currently offer a contactless payment facility. ePAL is developing a contactless payment system for debit cards based on EMV technology as well as an extension of debit cards for use for on-line transactions, and a mobile payment system. Using contactless debit cards on tap-and-go terminals routes the transaction through the more expensive credit card system instead of the EFTPOS route, adding to the cost to the merchant, and ultimately the consumer.

=== History ===
The name and logo for EFTPOS in Australia were originally owned by Shiyombo Makasa and were trade marks from 1986 until 1991. The ownership was for convenience and all the banks used the name and logo (commonly called "fat-E") on their cards and advertising. By mid July 1986, all major banks and retailers have agreed to implement eftpos.

In 1991, dialup EFTPOS was conceived by Key Corp (John Wood) and deployment of dialup commenced in 1993. Until 1993, communications, connections and transactions between banks, ATM banks and EFTPOS devices where conducted via leased lines (a specific power assisted communication line that detects any attempt to tamper with it) but in 1993, mobile wireless EFTPOS was conceived by Dynamic Data Systems (H. Daniel Elbaum). In 1995, Dynamic Data Systems and the banking industry worked together to implement, certify and introduce protocols and standards for cellular networks, and by 1998, the use of mobile EFTPOS began to appear in Australia.

In 2006, Commonwealth Bank and MasterCard ran a six-month trial of the contactless smart card system PayPass in Sydney and Wollongong, supplementing the traditional EFTPOS swipe or chip system. The system was rolled out across Australia in 2009; other systems being rolled out are Westpac Bank's MasterCard PayPass and Visa payWave branded cards.

In April 2009, a company, “EFTPOS Payments Australia Ltd” (ePal) was formed to manage and promote the EFTPOS system in Australia. ePal regulation commenced in January 2011. The initial members of EFTPOS Payments Australia Ltd were:

- ANZ Bank
- Australian Settlements Limited
- Bank of Queensland
- Bendigo & Adelaide Bank
- Cashcard
- Citigroup
- Commonwealth Bank
- Coles Group
- Cuscal
- Indue
- National Australia Bank
- Suncorp-Metway
- Westpac
- Woolworths

The current members of EFTPOS Payments Australia Ltd are:

- Adyen
- ANZ Bank
- Australian Settlements Limited
- Bank of Queensland
- Bendigo & Adelaide Bank
- Citigroup
- Commonwealth Bank
- Coles Group
- Cuscal
- EFTEX
- First Data Network Australia
- Indue
- ING Australia
- National Australia Bank
- PayPal
- Suncorp-Metway
- Tyro Payments
- Westpac
- Woolworths
- Zeller

In Australia, store cards have been excluded from participation in the EFTPOS and ATM systems. Consequently, several larger store accounts have entered into co-branding arrangements with credit card networks for the store-based accounts to be widely accepted. This was the case with Coles (previously, Coles-Myer) which co-branded with Mastercard, Myer which co-branded with Visa, and David Jones which co-branded with American Express. Woolworths organised its credit card called Everyday Rewards (now Woolworths Money) which initially was partnered with credit provider HSBC Bank, but changed on 26 October 2014 to Macquarie Bank.

=== Usage ===
As of June 2018, there were 961,247 EFTPOS terminals in Australia and 30,940 ATMs. Of the terminals, over 60,000 offered cash withdrawals. In 2010, 183 million transactions, worth A$12 billion, were made using Australian EFTPOS terminals per month.

In 2011, these figures increased to 750,000 terminals, with 325,000 individual businesses, processing over 2 billion transactions with combined value of approximately $131 billion for the year.

=== Network ===
The EFT network in Australia is made up of seven proprietary networks in which peers have interchange agreements, making an effective single network. A merchant who wishes to accept EFTPOS payments must enter an agreement with one of the seven merchant service providers, which rent the terminal to the merchant. All the merchant's EFTPOS transactions are processed through one of these gateways. Some of these peers are:

- Australia & New Zealand Banking Group
- Commonwealth Bank
- National Australia Bank
- Westpac
- Cuscal
- First Data Network Australia (formerly Cashcard)
- Other

Other organisations may have peering agreements with the one or more of the central peers.

The network uses the AS 2805 protocol, which is closely related to ISO 8583.

== New Zealand ==

EFTPOS is widely used in New Zealand. The national EFTPOS network is operated by two primary providers: Worldline New Zealand (formerly Electronic Transaction Services Limited then Paymark Limited) and Verifone. Both providers run an interconnected financial network that supports debit card transactions at point-of-sale terminals, as well as credit card and charge card payments.

=== History ===

In New Zealand, a trial scheme of EFTPOS began in 1984, with a terminal installed at a Shell petrol station connected to a bank computer. The Bank of New Zealand introduced EFTPOS in 1985, with the first merchant terminals being installed through a pilot scheme at petrol stations.

In 1989 the system was formally launched, with two bank-owned providers operating the network. Worldline New Zealand (formerly Paymark limited Electronic Transaction Services Limited) was sold in 2018 by ASB Bank, Westpac, Bank of New Zealand and ANZ Bank New Zealand (formerly ANZ National Bank). The second provider, EFTPOS New Zealand, was acquired by Verifone in December 2012.

In 1995, New Zealand's first cellular EFTPOS deployment occurred, enabling mobile terminals for merchants.

By July 2006 the five billionth EFTPOS payment had been processed nationwide, and the 10 billionth transaction milestone was reached in early 2012.

=== Usage ===
Card payments (including debit, credit, and EFTPOS) are the most common method of payment in New Zealand’s retail economy. National statistics show hundreds of millions of electronic card transactions each month, with around 166 million card payments recorded in May 2025 alone. A large majority of everyday retail spending in New Zealand is now paid electronically rather than with cash. Consumer surveys also indicate that around two-thirds of New Zealanders use cards for everyday purchases, and debit cards accounted for roughly 38.5 % of the total payments market share in 2025.

Worldline supports over 80,000 merchants with 150,000 EFTPOS terminals connected to their network. Verifone processes more than 700 million transactions per year, representing over 40% of all electronic transactions nationwide. Alongside the local team at Eftpos NZ, Verifone supports payments across 90,000+ business locations, with 115,000+ devices and websites connected to its gateway.

== Singapore ==
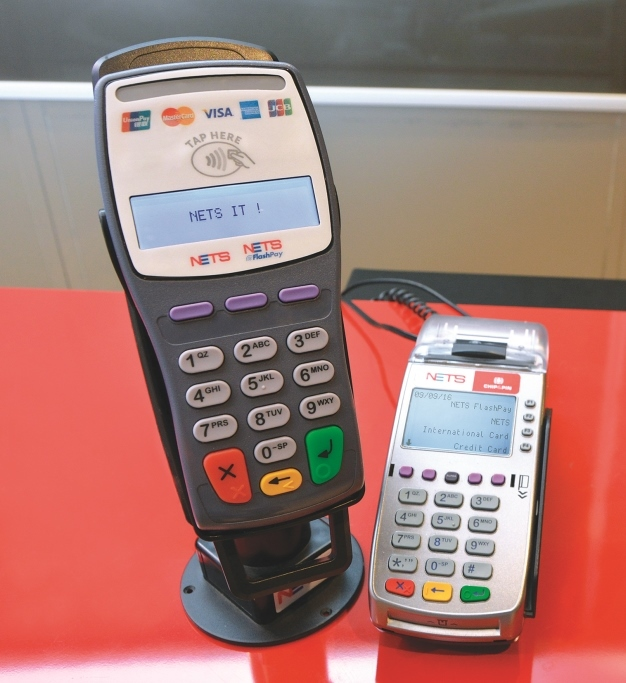
NETS POS

In Singapore, NETS was founded in 1985 by a consortium of the country's local banks of DBS Bank, OCBC Bank and United Overseas Bank (UOB) to establish the debit network and drive the adoption of electronic payments in Singapore.

=== History ===
NETS was officially launched on 18 January 1986, allowing millions of ATM card holders in Singapore to make transactions through the initial network of 195 terminals located in various retail outlets and by 1993, consumer spending through NETS reached S$1.14 billion. Since the late-2010s, NETS has also adopted QR code payments through NETS QR, which is also integrated with SGQR.

==== Mobile EFTPOS ====
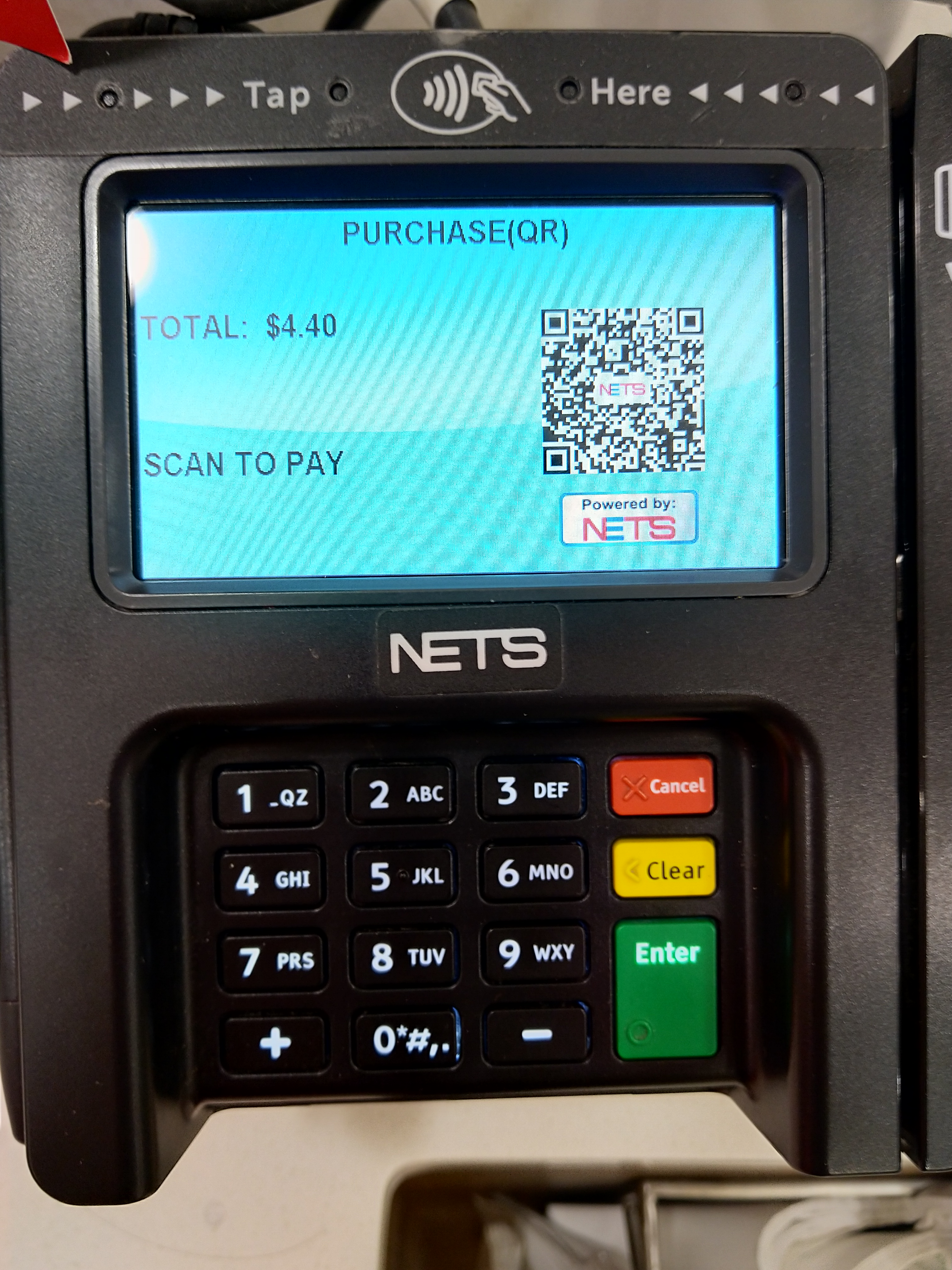
NETS QR

In 1996, mobile EFTPOS arrived, with hotels in Singapore installing systems in 1997 and the first example of a pizza delivery in Singapore accepting Visa card via cellular payment in 1998, which was a collaboration between Singnet, Visa, Citibank, and Dynamic Data Systems, beginning the rollout of mobile systems in Asia. By 2004, cellular based EFTPOS infrastructure had really taken off, and by 2010, cellular EFTPOS had become the standard for the global market.

=== Usage ===
The nationwide acceptance infrastructure is the largest in Singapore and includes 54,000 Unified Point-of-Sale (Unified POS) terminals and 94,000 QR acceptance points. In 2011, NETS' debit system was designated as national payment system by the Monetary Authority of Singapore.

== See also ==
- Payment terminal
- Interac
- Maestro
- NETS
- Visa Debit
- ACCC v Cabcharge Australia Ltd
- Cabcharge
