= HBX Group =

Travel technology company

- HBX Group logo

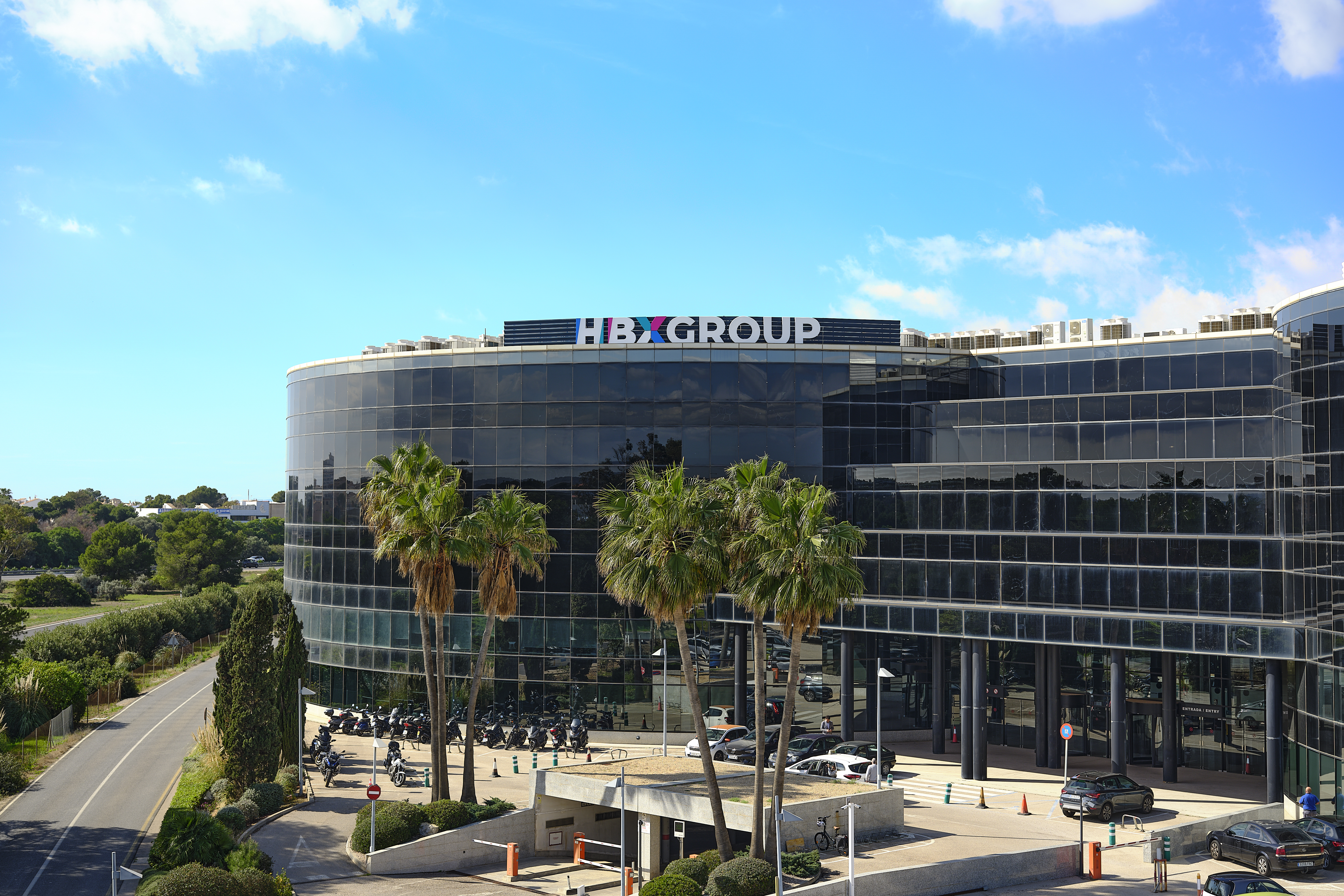
- HBX Group's head office in Palma
- Formerly: Hotelbeds
- Type: Public company
- Traded as: BMAD: HBX
- Industry: Travel technology
- Founded: 2001
- Headquarters: Palma, Majorca, Spain
- Area served: Worldwide
- Key people: Nicolas Huss (CEO)
- Number of employees: Approximately 3,700
- Website: www.hbxgroup.com

HBX Group is a global travel technology company headquartered in Palma, Mallorca, Spain. The company provides distribution and technology services to the travel industry.

== Business Overview ==
HBX Group owns and operates a business-to-business (B2B) marketplace that connects various travel industry stakeholders:

- Travel suppliers: Hotels and accommodation providers, car rental companies, transfer services, theme parks, attractions, and activities.
- Travel distributors: Online marketplaces, tour operators, travel advisors, airlines, loyalty programs, destinations, and other travel sellers.

The company's core business model involves negotiating preferential rates and room allocations with hotels globally, then distributing these accommodations to partners through its technology platform. HBX Group generates revenue through the markup between negotiated rates and selling prices to distributors.

The company maintains a portfolio of over 250,000 hotels, processing approximately 46 million room nights annually, and has agreements with 500 rental car suppliers and 23,000 experiences providers.

== History ==
=== Early Years (2001-2016) ===
Hotelbeds logo

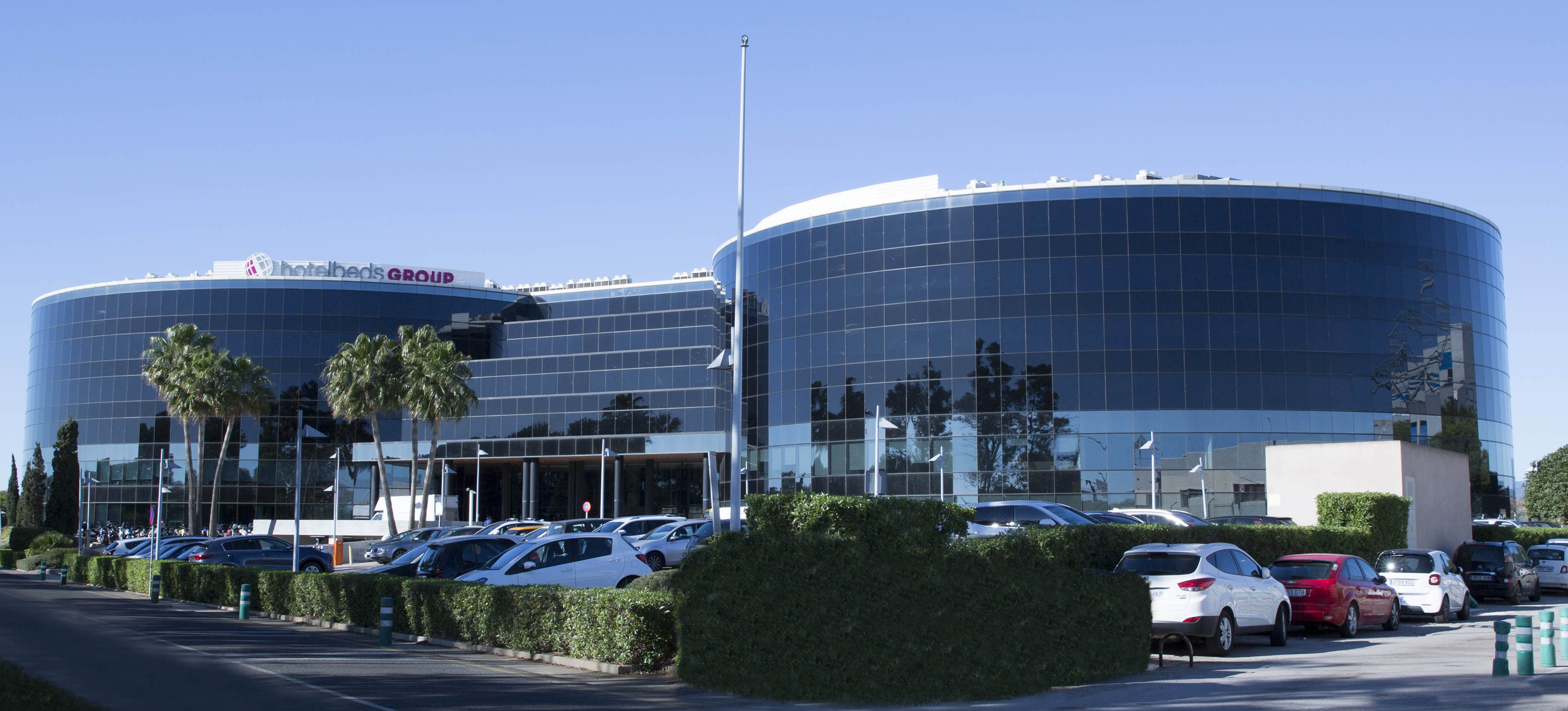
Hotelbeds HQ

The company's origins go back to 2001, as a unit of First Choice Holidays PLC. In 2007 First Choice Holidays PLC merged with the Tourism Division of TUI AG, forming TUI Travel PLC, with Hotelbeds as its primary brand in the Accommodation & Destinations unit, also referred as TUI Travel A&D.

A merger in 2014 between TUI Travel PLC and TUI AG led to the creation of the TUI Group. TUI Travel A&D changed its name to Hotelbeds Group and subsequently to Hotelbeds.

=== Private Equity Ownership (2016-today) ===
In April 2016, private equity firms Cinven and CPPIB acquired the company for approximately €1.2 billion. Under private equity ownership, the company grew through strategic acquisitions, enhanced its digital infrastructure and booking platforms, and developed new market segments. In 2017, Tourico Holidays and GTA Travel were purchased and integrated in 2018.

During 2020 and 2021, Hotelbeds was impacted by the effects of COVID-19 pandemic in tourism. The company received additional funding from Cinven, EQT and CPPIB.

Joan Vilà, CEO, stepped down from his position in 2021 to adopt a non-executive role, while remaining a shareholder. He was succeeded by Nicolas Huss.

In January 2025, HBX Group announced plans for an initial public offering (IPO) on the Spanish stock exchange (Bolsa de Madrid).

== Business Divisions ==
HBX Group operates through three main brands:

- Hotelbeds: The company's flagship brand is a primary hotel distribution platform, serving travel wholesalers, tour operators, and travel agencies, mainly via its API ecosystem.
- Bedsonline: A web-based booking platform specifically designed for travel advisors and retail travel agencies. Bedsonline offers travel products including accommodations, transfers, activities, and car rentals.
- Roiback: A technology solutions provider specializing in direct distribution for the hospitality industry (website development, booking engine, and digital marketing).
