= Live Group =

Live group Pty Ltd
- Type: Private company
- Traded as: Live group
- Industry: Merchant services Financial services
- Founded: 2006
- Headquarters: Sydney, Australia
- Area served: Australia
- Key people: Reuven Barukh (CEO), Ewaz Barukh deceased (Chairman)
- Products: Payment service provider, Merchant services, EFTPOS, Cash advance, Direct debit, Vehicle for hire
- Website: www.livegroup.com.au

Live group Pty Limited is a merchant services provider, accredited by Mastercard. Originally established by Macquarie Bank in 2006 as Live Payments, the company was privatised in 2008 and restructured as Live group.

== History ==
Live group was originally established as Live payments by Macquarie Bank in 2006. The company offered a unique corporate taxi payments solution and online reconciliation portal that assists corporate users in tracking their taxi expenditure. Former Cabcharge Australia Ltd executive Ewaz Barukh was appointed managing director in early 2007.

In March 2008 Live Payments was privatised and in November of that year acquired Live TaxiEpay. Live TaxiEpay, is a wholly owned subsidiary of the Live group specifically involved in supplying EFTPOS terminals, payment devices and additional value-added services to the Australian taxi industry. Since then, company sites have been opened in Sydney, Brisbane, Melbourne, Adelaide and Perth, with dealers and distributors located around the country. In 2016 Live TaxiEpay rebranded as Live taxi.

In 2010 Live TaxiEpay partnered with Motorpass to establish a corporate taxi payments solution.

In 2014, Live TaxiEpay considered legal action against New South Wales and Victoria for what it claimed was anti-competitive legislation after New South Wales passed laws on halving service fees on non-cash taxi payments. The company along with competitors GM Cabs and Ingogo argued that the service fee caps were reducing competition rather than increasing it.

In 2012, Live group launched Live eftpos, offering payment services catered to small and medium-sized enterprises (SME) in Australia. In 2017, Live group announced a partnership with Qantas Business Rewards.

Between 2015 and 2016, Live group launched three additional brands into the Australian market; Live capital, Live insure and Glide taxi.

In April 2019, Live group announced a partnership with Zip Co Limited and in June 2019, launched Live sms, an SMS communication platform designed to help small business.

In April 2020, Live group launched Live local, a digital voucher platform specifically to help Australian SMEs through COVID-19.
