= Verifone =

Multinational point-of-sale equipment manufacturer

Verifone, Inc.
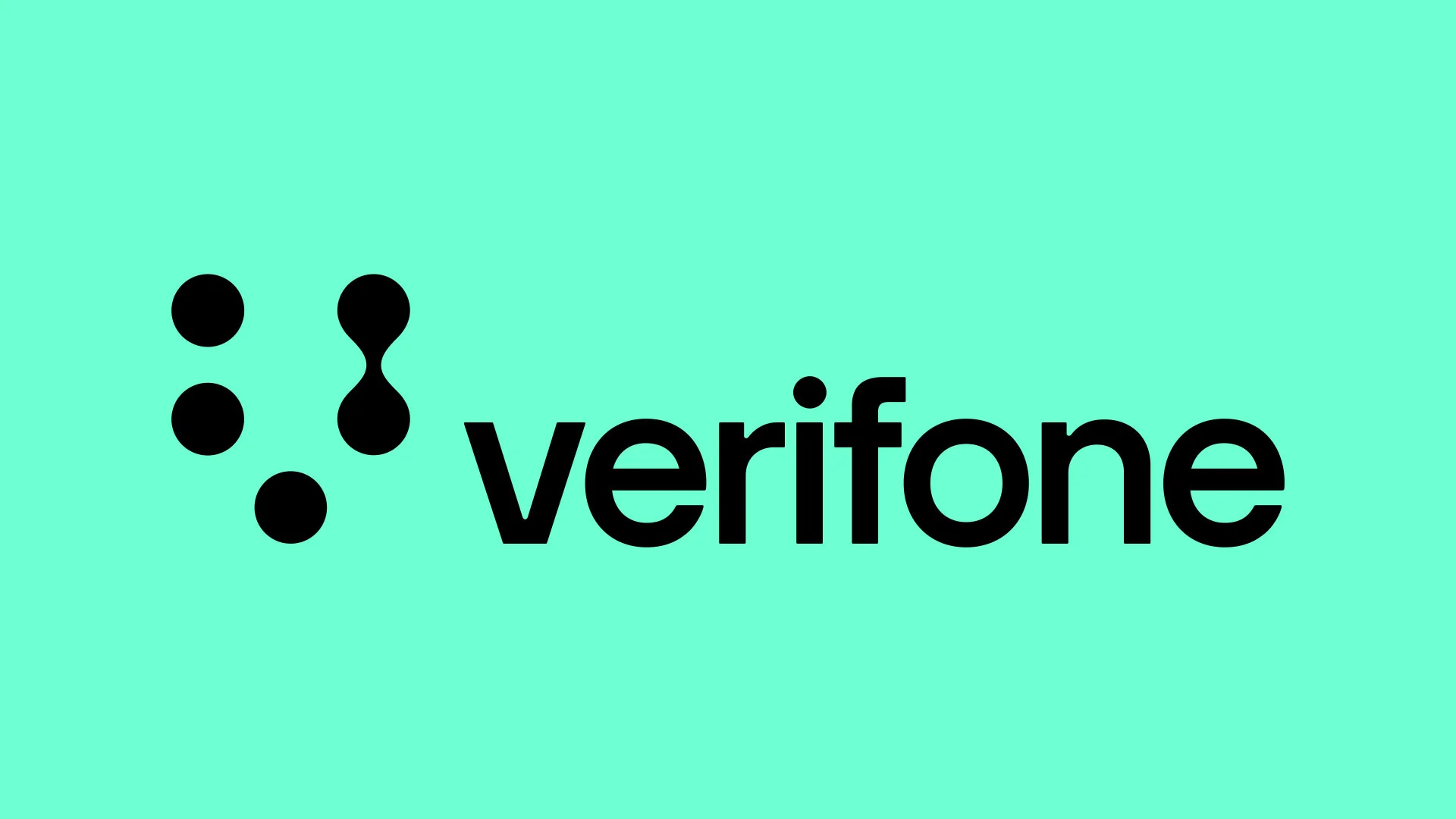
- Verifone's logo, in use since 2023
- Type: Private
- Industry: Banking & finance, electronics
- Founded: 1981; 45 years ago in Hawaii, U.S.
- Founder: Original founder Edward Berger Later sold to William "Bill" Melton
- Headquarters: New York City, U.S.
- Area served: Worldwide
- Key people: Himanshu Patel (CEO)
- Products: Payment terminals; tablet-based POS software; POS systems for the petro and convenience industry; payment services; taxi media and advertising; loyalty and upselling solution
- Services: Payment as a service
- Revenue: ▲US$1.8 billion (2014)
- Total assets: ▲US$3.748 billion (2012)
- Total equity: ▲US$1.384 billion (2013)
- Owner: Francisco Partners
- Number of employees: 4138
- Website: verifone.com

Verifone, Inc. is an American multinational corporation headquartered in New York City. Verifone provides technology for electronic payment transactions and value-added services at the point of sale (POS). Verifone sells merchant-operated, consumer-facing and self-service payment systems to the financial, retail, hospitality, petroleum, government and healthcare industries. The company's products consist of POS electronic payment devices that run its own operating systems, security and encryption software, and certified payment software, and that are designed for both consumer-facing and unattended environments.

Its products process a range of payment types, including signature and personal identification number (PIN)-based debit cards, credit cards, contactless/radio frequency identification cards, smart cards, prepaid gift and other stored-value cards, electronic bill payment, check authorization and conversion, signature capture and electronic benefit transfer (EBT).

In 2018, Verifone was acquired by Francisco Partners for US$3.4 billion. The company's architecture enables multiple applications, including third-party applications, such as gift card and loyalty card programs, healthcare insurance eligibility, and time and attendance tracking, and allows these services to reside on the same system without requiring recertification upon the addition of new applications.

== Overview ==
As of October 31, 2013, the company held trademark registration in 22 jurisdictions (including registration in the EU that covers various country level registrations that the company had previously filed) for the ‘VERIFONE’ trademark and in 32 jurisdictions (including registration in the EU that covers various country level registrations that the company had previously filed) for ‘VERIFONE’ trademark, including its ribbon logo. On November 3, 2014, The company unveiled a new corporate logo, and brand identity. From its beginnings as the first payment device manufacturer, Verifone's product and point-of-sale service offerings have changed considerably. Verifone offer payment technology expertise, and services that add value to the point of sale with merchant-operated, consumer-facing and self-service POS payment systems.

Founded in Hawaii, U.S. in 1981, Verifone in 2014 operated in more than 150 countries worldwide and employed nearly 5,000 people globally. Verifone's growth came from partnerships, and from acquisitions. Core focus and growth areas for the company include mobile commerce, security, services and emerging global markets.

Verifone has headquarters in New York City and office presence in more than 45 countries.

== History ==
Verifone was founded by William "Bill" Melton and incorporated in Hawaii in 1981, naming itself for its first telephone-based transaction processing product. The brand name combined "Veri-" from verification, and "fone", a shortening of telephone.

Since the late 1980s, Verifone has held more than 60 percent of the U.S. market, and during the 1990s the company captured more than half of the international market for such systems. In 1996, the company placed its five millionth system. Domestic and international sales of POS systems continue to form the majority of Verifone's annual sales, which hit $387 million in 1995 and were expected to top $500 million in subsequent years.

The sudden growth of the Internet, and especially the World Wide Web, in the mid-1990s created a demand for secure online financial transaction applications. Verifone has designed applications conforming to the Secure Electronic Transaction (SET) standards developed by Visa Inc. and MasterCard. With the $28 million 1995 acquisition of Enterprise Integration Technologies, the company that developed the Secure HyperText Transfer Protocol (S-HTTP), and a $4 million equity investment in CyberCash, Inc., led by Verifone founder William Melton, and with 1996 partnership agreements with web browser leaders Netscape, Oracle Corporation, and Microsoft, Verifone has rolled out a suite of software products targeted at consumers, merchants, and financial institutions allowing secure purchases and other transactions online. Purchases over the Internet, which still produced as little as $10 million in 1995, were expected to reach into the billions by the turn of the century. Verifone has also been working to marry the smart card to the Internet; in 1996, the company introduced the Personal ATM (P-ATM), a small smart card reader designed to be attached to the consumer's home computer, which will enable the consumer not only to make purchases over the Internet, but also to "recharge" the value on the card. Verifone has also partnered with Key Tronic to incorporate a P-ATM interface directly into that company's computer keyboards.

=== 1980s: Introduction and rapid growth ===
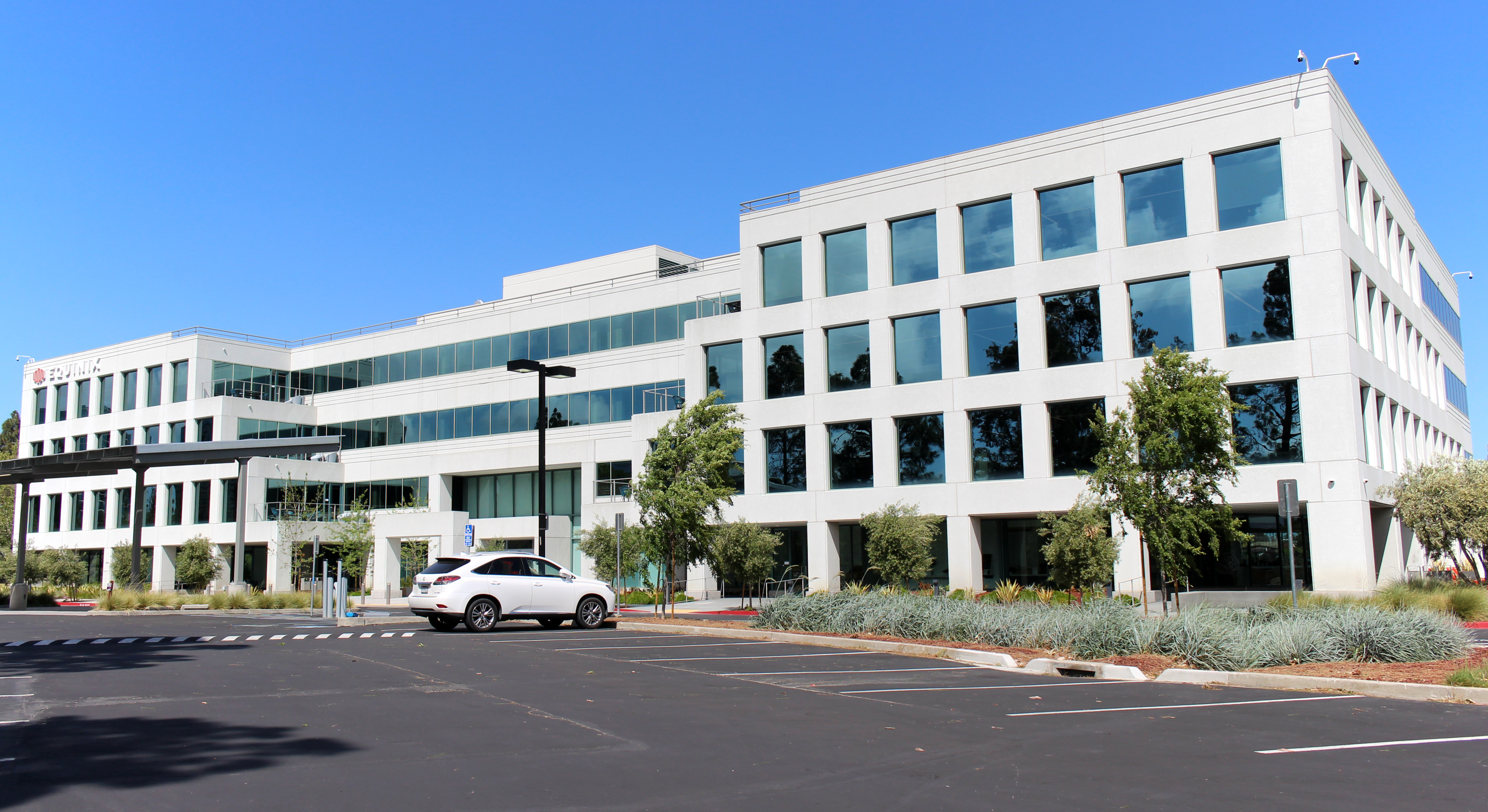
Former Verifone headquarters in Redwood City, now home to Equinix

By the beginning of the 1980s, the major credit card companies began seeking methods to reduce processing costs and losses due to fraud. In 1981, Visa and MasterCard began offering merchants discounts on their transactions if they agreed to use newly developed automated transaction technology for all credit card purchases greater than $50. This move opened the way for the creation of an industry devoted to producing POS authorization systems. Early systems typically had starting prices of $900.

Verifone introduced its first POS product in 1982. By lowering manufacturing and operating costs through outsourcing production, Verifone brought its first system to the market at $500. Working with Visa, Verifone captured a large share of the POS market. In 1984, the company introduced ZON credit card authorization system was priced at $125. It took advantage of improvements in processor speeds and the lowering cost of both processors and memory. The following year, Verifone moved its headquarters to Redwood City, outside of San Francisco. The company's revenues grew to $15.3 million, earning a net profit of $864,000.

The company doubled revenues, to about $30 million, in 1986. By January 1988, Verifone controlled more than 53 percent of the POS systems market. Revenues had reached $73.4 million, with net earnings of more than $6 million. The following year, the company increased its dominance in the industry with the purchase of the transaction automation business of Icot Corp., then second in the market with a 20.5 percent share. The acquisition boosted Verifone's revenues to $125 million. By then, Verifone had entered the international market, starting with Australia in 1988 and placing its millionth ZON system in Finland in 1989.

=== 1990s: Expansion into new markets ===
Verifone went public in March 1990, raising more than $54 million. As the credit card industry matured, Verifone pushed to install its systems into new markets, such as restaurants, movie theaters, and taxis, as well as developing software capacity to bring its systems into the health care and health insurance markets and to government functions. International sales also began to build, as use of credit cards became increasingly accepted in foreign markets. VeriFone was also building its global operation, opening facilities in Bangalore, Singapore, England, Dallas, and Ft. Lauderdale, in addition to its Hawaii and California facilities. Rolling out its Gemstone line of transaction systems, which added inventory control, pricing, and other capabilities, Verifone was aided by announcements from Visa and MasterCard that the companies would no longer provide printed warning bulletins, while requiring merchants to seek authorization for all credit card transactions by 1994.

Revenues jumped from $155 million in 1990 to $226 million in 1992. Verifone had just placed its two millionth system a year ago. By 1993, Verifone systems were in place in more than 70 countries, including its three millionth system, in Brazil, representing the company's expansion in the Latin American market. International sales, which had contributed less than ten percent of revenues before 1990, now accounted for more than 30 percent of the company's nearly $259 million in annual revenues.

Banks began rolling out debit cards in the mid-1990s. In response, Verifone produced terminals designed with keypads for PIN numbers. But as the domestic credit and debit card markets neared saturation, Verifone changed its primary focus to producing software applications, offering vertically integrated systems, including applications for standard computer operating systems. It also built a new plant near Shanghai in China in 1994 to increase production capacity.

Verifone moved to take the lead in the coming smart card revolution, teaming up with Gemplus International, a France-based maker of the cards, and MasterCard International to form the joint venture SmartCash. To place the company close to technological developments in France and the rest of Europe, Verifone opened its Paris research and development center in 1994. The company launched its smart card in May 1995. The company introduced its Personal ATM, a palm-sized smart card reader capable of reading a variety of smart card formats, in September 1996, with the product expected to ship in 1997. Among the first customers already signed to support the P-ATM were American Express, MasterCard International, GTE, Mondex International, Visa International, Wells Fargo Bank, and Sweden's Sparbanken Bank. Contracts for each called for the purchase of a minimum of 100,000 units; the total market potential for the device was estimated at more than 100 million households. In addition, Verifone began developing smart card readers to supplement and eventually replace its five million credit and debit card authorization systems.

In 1995, Verifone began the first of its aggressive steps to enter an entirely new area, that of Internet-based transactions. In May 1995, the company partnered with Broadvision Inc., a developer of Internet, interactive television, computer network, and other software, to couple Verifone's Virtual Terminal software—a computer-based version of its standard transaction terminal—with BroadVision's offerings, thereby extending Verifone's products beyond the retail counter for the first time. In August 1995, however, Verifone took an even bigger step into the Internet transaction arena, with its $28 million acquisition of Enterprise Integration Technologies, developer of the S-HTTP industry standard for safeguarding transactions over the World Wide Web. Verifone followed that acquisition with a $4 million investment in William Melton's latest venture, CyberCash Inc., also working to develop Internet transaction systems.

By 1996, Verifone was ready with its Payment Transaction Application Layer (PTAL) lineup of products, including the Virtual terminal interface for merchants conducting sales with consumers; Internet Gateway or vGATE, to conduct transactions between merchants and financial institutions; and the Pay Window interface for consumers making purchases on the Internet. After securing agreements from Netscape, Oracle, and Microsoft to include Verifone software in their web browsers, Verifone and Microsoft announced in August 1996 that Verifone's virtual point of sale (vPOS) would be included in the Microsoft Merchant System to be released by the end of the year. Verifone's announcement of the P-ATM, able to be attached as a computer peripheral, wedded the company's smart card and Internet transaction efforts.

Hewlett-Packard acquired Verifone in a $1.18bn stock-swap deal in April 1997. Four years later Verifone was sold to Gores Technology Group in May 2001. In 2002 Verifone was recapitalized by GTCR Golder Rauner, LLC. In 2005, Verifone was listed as a public company on New York Stock Exchange (NYSE: PAY).

=== 2000s: Acquisitions ===
In October 2004, Israeli-based Lipman Electronics had acquired United Kingdom-based Dione plc, to go alongside its "NURIT" brand. On November 1, 2006 Verifone completed its acquisition of Lipman, and added both Dione and NURIT products to its portfolio for an undisclosed sum.

In September 2006 Verifone acquired some divisions of Irish terminal and payment services company Trintech Group plc – headquartered in Dublin with offices in Montevideo, Neu-Isenburg and London amongst other locations – in a 12.1M USD (€9.4M) cash transaction.

The company was formerly known as VeriFone Holdings, Inc. and changed its name to VeriFone Systems, Inc. in 2010. In 2014 the company rebranded itself as Verifone with a lowercase 'f'. Verifone in 2014 was based in San Jose, California, and has marketing and sales offices across the world. High economic growth abroad, coupled with infrastructure development, support from governments seeking to increase value-added tax (“VAT”) and Sales Tax collections, and the expanding presence of IP and Wireless communication networks resulted in revenue from abroad exceeding revenue generated from domestic sales. Specifically, its North America market share fell from 57.4% of total revenues in 2006, to only 39% or $359.14 million in total revenues for fiscal 2008. On the other hand, International operations went from comprising only 42.5% of total revenues in 2006 to 61% or $564.46 million of total revenues in 2008.

In April 2018, Verifone was acquired by Francisco Partners for US$3.4 billion.

== Products ==
Verifone, Inc. is an international producer and designer of electronic payment methods and devices. The company divides its business into two segments: Systems Solutions and Services. Systems Solutions consists of operations related to the sale of electronic payment products that enable electronic transactions. The Services segment includes warranty and support services. In fiscal year 2008, Verifone's Systems Solutions segment generated 87.5% of total revenues, which amounted to $807.46 million, while its Services segment contributed 12.5%, or $114.46 million in revenue.

Its principal product lines have included point-of-sale, merchant-operated, consumer-facing and self-service payment systems. It provides countertop electronic payment terminals that accept card payment options Mobile payment, chip and PIN, and Contactless payment, including Near field communication (NFC) as well as support Credit and Debit cards, EBT cards, EMV, and other PIN-based transactions; an array of software applications and application libraries; and portable devices that support 3G, GPRS, Bluetooth, and WiFi technologies.

The company also offers multimedia consumer facing POS devices; unattended and self-service payment methods designed to enable payment transactions in self-service environments; and integrated electronic payment systems that combine electronic payment processing, fuel dispensing, and ECR functions, as well as payment systems for integration. In addition, it provides mobile payment methods for various segments of the mobile point of sale environment; contactless peripherals; network access devices; security systems; payment-as-a-service and other managed services, terminal management, payment-enabled media, and payment system security; and server-based payment processing software and middleware. Further, the company offers equipment repair or maintenance, gateway processing, remote terminal management, software post-contract support, customized application development, helpdesk, customer service, warehousing, and encryption or tokenization services.

=== Countertop and PIN Pads ===
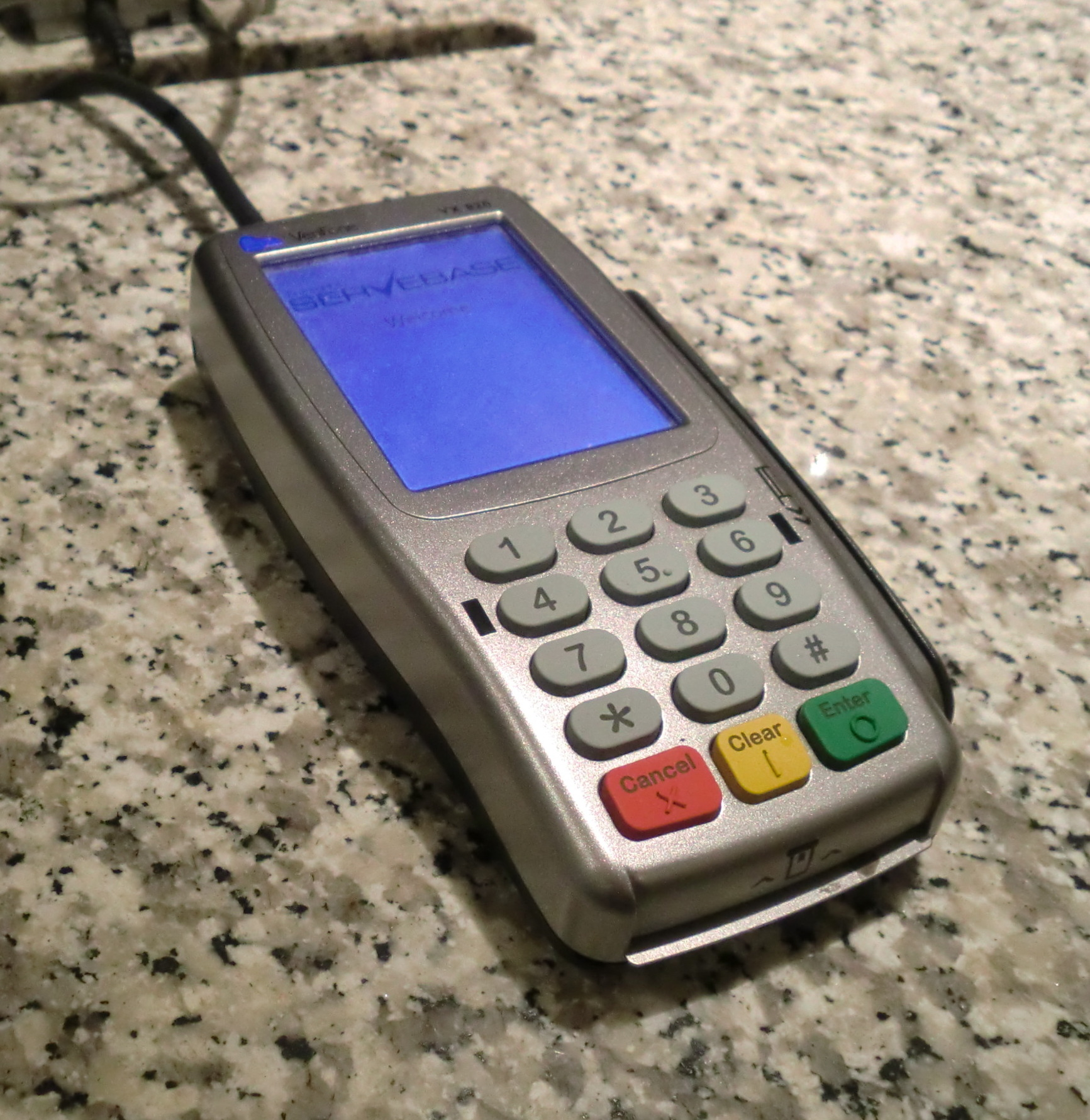
VeriFone VX820 credit card terminal

The company's countertop devices accept various card payment options, including payment options using Near field communication (NFC) technology, mobile wallets, chip and PIN, QR code and contact-less payments. Its VX Evolution generation of countertop devices supports a range of applications, such as pre-paid products, including gift cards and loyalty programs. The VX Evolution devices also integrate the company's NFC software technology to manage multiple NFC-based mobile wallets, applications, and programs. It also offers various other VX model countertop devices, including a hybrid device that reads both magnetic strip and chip card transactions using a single card reader, offering options for a range of connectivity choices, and battery operated and color displays. The company also supplies PIN pads that support credit and debit card, EBT, EMV, and other PIN-based transactions, and include multiple connectivity options, including a 3G option and NFC capability. Its countertop devices also support a range of applications that are either built into electronic payment systems or connect to electronic cash registers (ECRs) and POS systems. In addition, it offers a range of certified software applications and application libraries that enable its countertop systems and PIN pads to interface with major ECR and POS systems.

Verifone has sold numerous point-of-sale credit card reading products, including the ZON Jr (1984), Tranz 330 and ZON Jr XL(1987), Omni 460 (1991) and Omni 3200 (1999) which were the most successful transaction terminals of their times. The company's most popular current products include the Omni 3700 Family, featuring the Omni 3750 and Omni 3740. In 2004, Verifone introduced its newest line of products, Vx Solutions (also called VerixV). These include the Vx510, Vx520 and Vx570, which are countertop terminals offering dial-up or Ethernet access, and the Vx610 and Vx670 which are portable, include batteries, and an integrated wireless communications module. The Vx610 is offered in GPRS, CDMA, and WiFi wireless configurations, and is considered a 'countertop mobile' product. The Vx670 is a true portable or 'handover' version available with GPRS, WiFi, and as of November 2007, Bluetooth-integrated communications modules. The Vx670, in particular, is a deterrent against the theft of credit information because the customer is not required to relinquish possession of his or her credit card; instead transacting directly with the Vx670 in a 'pay at table' sense. The Vx510 is repackaged as Omni 3730, capitalizing the huge sales of the Omni 3700 series. A derivative of Omni3730 is the Omni 3750LE, which has reduced features, but lower price. The VX Evolution devices integrate the company's NFC software technology to manage multiple NFC-based mobile wallets, applications, and programs.

=== Multimedia Customer Facing ===
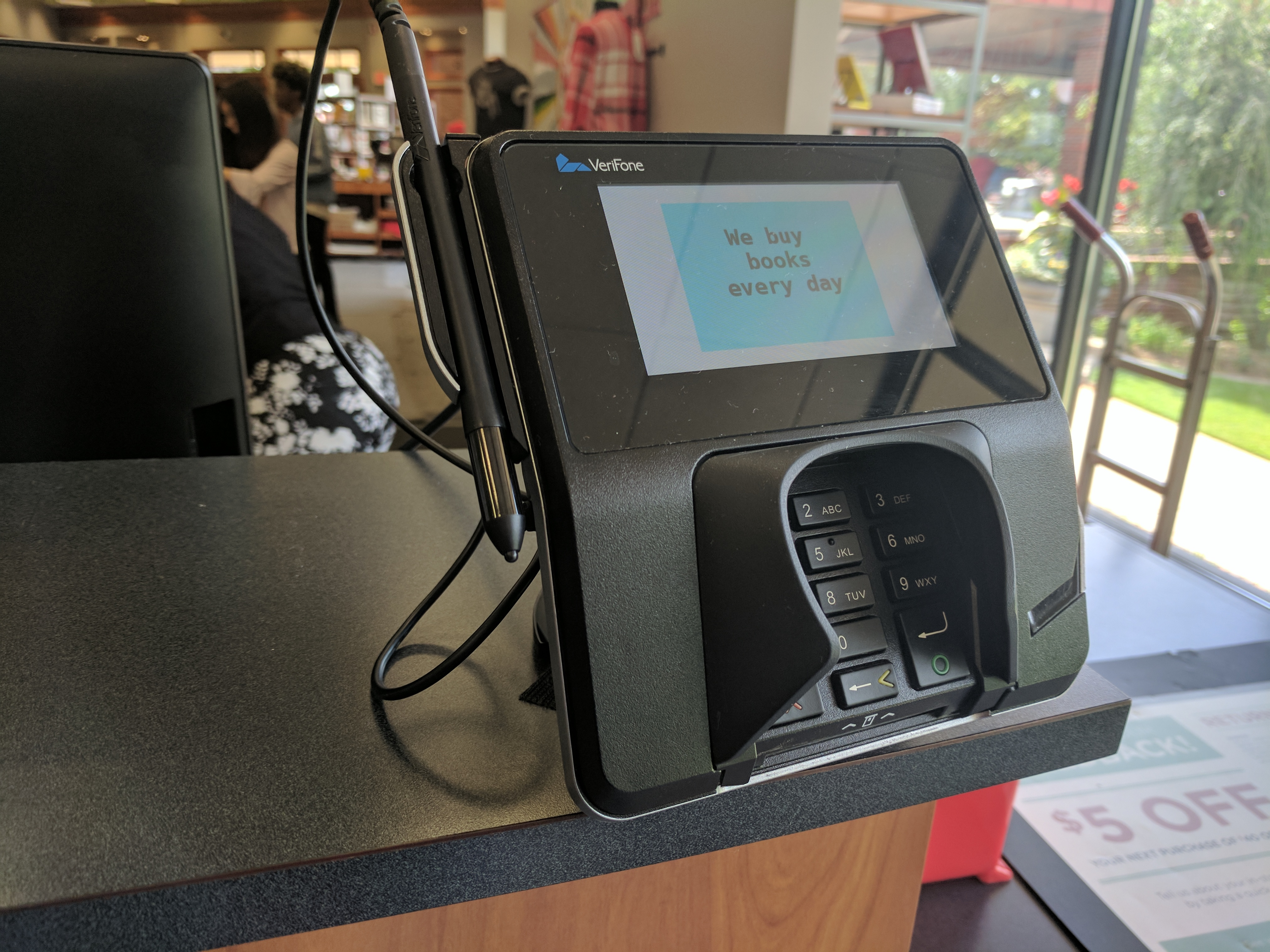
A touch screen based VeriFone MX 915 series payment terminal

The company's range of multimedia consumer facing POS devices are designed to allow merchants, primarily in the multi-lane retail environment, to engage in direct customer interaction through customized multimedia content, in-store promotions, digital offers, and other value-added services using a POS device. Its multimedia consumer-facing products are offered under its “MX solutions” brand. These products include color graphic displays, interfaces, ECR compatibility, key pads, signature capture functionality, and other features that serve customers in a multi-lane retail environment. The company's “MX solutions” also feature a modular hardware architecture that allows merchants to introduce capabilities, such as contactless or NFC. Its “MX solutions” include a range of products that support these same features in self-service market segments, such as taxis, parking lots/garages, ticketing machines, vending machines, gas pumps, self-checkouts, and quick service restaurants.

In 2005 Verifone released its first full color EFT-POS terminal, the MX 870. The MX 870 is capable of full screen video and is used to build applications by Verifone customers. The MX 870 is the first in the MX 800 series of Visual Payment Terminals, to compete with MX 850, MX 860 and MX 880. All of these terminals run Embedded Linux and use FST FancyPants and the Opera (browser) for their GUI platform.

In 2009, Verifone partnered with Hypercom and Ingenico to found the Secure POS Vendor Alliance, a non-profit organization whose goal is to increase awareness of and improve payment industry security.

In 2010 Verifone announced the VX Evolution product line, designed to PCI PED 2.0 specs and providing native support for VeriShield Total Protect, Verifone's encryption and tokenization solution. The VX Evolution line is an extension of Verifone's countertop and PIN pad products and included a number of upgrades from earlier models, such as full color display, ARM 11 processors and a fully programmable PIN pad.

== Competition ==
Verifone is one of the top three providers of electronic payment systems and services in the world. The markets for this company's products are highly competitive, and have been subject to price pressures. Competition from manufacturers, distributors, and providers of similar products have caused price reductions, reduced margins, and a loss of market share. For example, one of Verifone's former customers--First Data Corporation has developed its own series of proprietary electronic payment systems for the U.S. market. Moreover, Verifone competes with suppliers of cash registers that provide built in electronic payment capabilities and producers of software that support electronic payment over the internet, as well as other manufacturers or distributors of electronic payment systems. Finally, Verifone competes with smaller companies that have been able to develop strong local or regional customer bases. The firm's main competitors are:

- PAX Technology
- Ingenico
- NCR Corporation

Verifone acquired a smaller competitor Hypercom in an all-stock transaction deal in 2011.

== Acquisitions ==
Date	Acquired company	HQ	Amount	Expertise
September 2020	2checkout	USA		
November 2018	Dimebox	Netherlands		
February 2016	AJB Software Design	Canada	$75M	Provides electronic payment solutions
November 2015	InterCard AG	Germany		Provides acquiring services
December 2012	EFTPOS New Zealand Limited	New Zealand	$70M	Provides computer terminals and online payment gateway
December 2012	Sektor Group	United Arab Emirates	$8.2M	Provides EFT-POS systems
March 2012	Lift Retail Marketing	USA	n.a.	Provides digital marketing systems
November 2011	Point International AB	Sweden	$818M	Provides electronic payment solutions
November 2011	Global Bay Inc.	USA	$28M in stock	Designs mobile retail software to enhance retailer-to-consumer interaction
May 2011	Destiny Electronic Commerce Pvt. Ltd.	South Africa	$37M	Provides electronic payment solutions
January 2011	Gemalto NV	France	$14M	Point of sale solutions
November 2010	Hypercom Corporation	USA	$485M	Provides transaction processing services especially related to network payment systems
September 2010	Semtek innovative Solutions Corporation	USA	$18M	Provides endpoint encryption solutions
September 2010	WAY Systems, Inc.	USA	$9M	Provides mobile POS solutions and gateway services for mobile merchants
May 2010	Orange Logic Ltd.	South Korea	n.a.	Provides payment systems
April 2010	VeriFone Transportation Systems	USA	n.a.	Provides payment terminals in transportation
November 2006	Lipman Electronics	Israel	$793M	Provides payment terminals (NURIT brand)
September 2006	Trintech	Ireland	$12.1M	Linux-based and unattended point of sale terminals
October 2004	Dione plc.	United Kingdom	n.a.	Provides payment terminals
November 1995	Enterprise Integration Technologies	USA	$28M	Provides software and consulting services for Internet Commerce
August 1995	CyberCash Inc.	USA	$4M in stock	Provides internet payment services
January 1989	LCOT Corp.	USA	n.a.	Provides technology for transaction automation

== Divestments ==
- Global Bay sold to Manhattan Associates in 2014.

== Corporate affairs ==
The company is run by a board of directors made up of mostly company outsiders, as is customary for publicly traded companies. Members of the board of directors as of June 2014 are: Robert W. Alspaugh(Director), Karen Austin(Director), Paul Galant(Director; Chief Executive Officer), Alex W. (Pete) Hart(Chairman of the Board of Directors), Robert B. Henske(Director), Wenda Harris Millard(Director), Eitan Raff(Director), Jonathan I. Schwart(Director), Jane J. Thompson(Director).

Under the Corporate Governance Guidelines of the company, the Board is free to select its Chairman and company's CEO in the manner it considers to be in its best interests at any given point in time. Since 2008 the positions of Chairman of the Board and CEO have been held by separate persons. The Board believes that this structure is appropriate for them because it allows CEO to focus his time and energy on leading its key business and strategic initiatives while the Board focuses on oversight of management, overall enterprise risk management and corporate governance. The Board and its committees meet throughout the year on a set schedule, usually at least once a quarter, and also hold special meetings from time to time. Agendas and topics for Board and committee meetings are developed through discussions between management and members of the Board and its committees. Information and data that are important to the issues to be considered are distributed in advance of each meeting. Board meetings and background materials focus on key strategic, operational, financial, enterprise risk, governance and compliance matters.

=== Board’s Role in Risk Oversight ===
The Board executes its risk management responsibility directly and through its committees. As set forth in its charter and annual work plan, Audit Committee has primary responsibility for overseeing their enterprise risk management process. The Audit Committee receives updates and discusses individual and overall risk areas during its meetings, including financial risk assessments, operations risk management policies, major financial risk exposures, exposures related to compliance with legal and regulatory requirements, and management's actions to monitor and control such exposures. The Vice President of Internal Audit reviews with the Audit Committee company's annual operational risk assessment results and at least once each quarter the results of internal audits, including the adequacy of internal controls over financial reporting. The Vice President of Internal Audit and Chief Information Officer report to the Audit Committee on information systems controls and security.

Throughout each fiscal year, the Audit Committee invites appropriate members of management to its meetings to provide enterprise-level reports relevant to the Audit Committee's oversight role, including adequacy and effectiveness of management reporting and controls systems used to monitor adherence to policies and approved guidelines, information systems and security over systems and data, treasury, insurance structure and coverage, tax structure and planning, worldwide disaster recovery planning and the overall effectiveness of company's operations risk management policies. The Audit Committee is generally scheduled to meet at least twice a quarter, and generally covers one or more areas relevant to its risk oversight role in at least one of these meetings.

The Compensation Committee oversees risks associated with company's compensation policies and practices with respect to executive compensation and executive recruitment and retention, as well as compensation generally. In establishing and reviewing the executive compensation program, Compensation Committee consults with independent compensation experts and seeks to structure the program so as to not encourage unnecessary or excessive risk taking. Company's compensation program utilizes a mix of base salary and short-term and long-term incentive awards designed to align the executive compensation with success, particularly with respect to financial performance and stockholder value. The Compensation Committee sets the amount of company's executives’ base salaries at the beginning of each fiscal year. A substantial portion of bonus amounts are tied to overall corporate performance and stockholder value. Compensation provided to the executive officers also includes a substantial portion in the form of long-term equity awards that help align executives’ interests with those of its stockholders over a longer term.

The Corporate Governance and Nominating committee oversees risks related to company's overall corporate governance, including development of corporate governance principles applicable to company, evaluation of federal securities laws and regulations with respect to its insider trading policy, development of standards to be applied in making determinations as to the absence of material relationships between company and a director and formal periodic evaluations of the Board and management.

=== Adoption of Majority Voting Provision ===
In considering best practices of corporate governance among peer companies and governance practices recommended by shareholder advisory organizations and supported by company's stockholders, company amended its Bylaws and the Corporate Governance Guidelines in fiscal year 2013 to adopt a majority voting provision which became effective immediately following the close of it 2013 Annual Meeting of Stockholders. Such provision provides that, in an uncontested election of directors, each director shall be elected by the vote of the majority of the votes cast (meaning the number of shares voted “for” a nominee must exceed the number of shares voted “against” such nominee), and in a contested election, each director shall be elected by a plurality of the votes cast.

A contested election is defined as an election for which company's Corporate Secretary determines that the number of director nominees exceeds the number of directors to be elected as of the date that is ten days preceding the date their first mail notice of meeting for such meeting to stockholders. Under the amended Corporate Governance Guidelines, any nominee in an uncontested election who receives a greater number of “against” votes than “for” votes shall promptly tender his or her resignation following certification of the vote. The 12 Corporate Governance and Nominating Committee shall consider the resignation offer and shall recommend to the Board the action to be taken. In considering whether to recommend accepting or rejecting the tendered resignation, the Corporate Governance and Nominating Committee will consider all factors that it deems relevant including, but not limited to, any reasons stated by stockholders for their “withheld” votes for election of the director, the length of service and qualifications of the director, their Corporate Governance Guidelines and the director's overall contributions as a member of Board. The Board will consider these and any other factors it deems relevant, as well as the Corporate Governance and Nominating Committee's recommendation, when deciding whether to accept or reject the tendered resignation. Any director whose resignation is under consideration shall not participate in the Corporate Governance and Nominating Committee deliberation and recommendation regarding whether to accept the resignation. The Board shall take action within 90 days following certification of the vote, unless a longer period of time is necessary in order to comply with any applicable NYSE or SEC rule or regulation, in which event the Board shall take action as promptly as is practicable while satisfying such requirements.
