= Ingenico =

Electronic payment technology company

- Type: Private
- Industry: Financial services
- Founded: 1980; 46 years ago
- Founders: Jean-Jacques Poutrel; Michel Malhouitre
- Headquarters: Suresnes, France
- Key people: Floris de Kort (CEO)
- Services: Payment terminals
- Revenue: €3.37 billion (2019)
- Owner: Apollo Global Management
- Number of employees: 3,500
- Website: ingenico.com

Ingenico is a French merchant services technology company, that facilitates secure electronic transactions. The company expanded as a manufacturer of point of sale (POS) payment terminals to also include complete merchant payment SaaS and related services.

== History ==
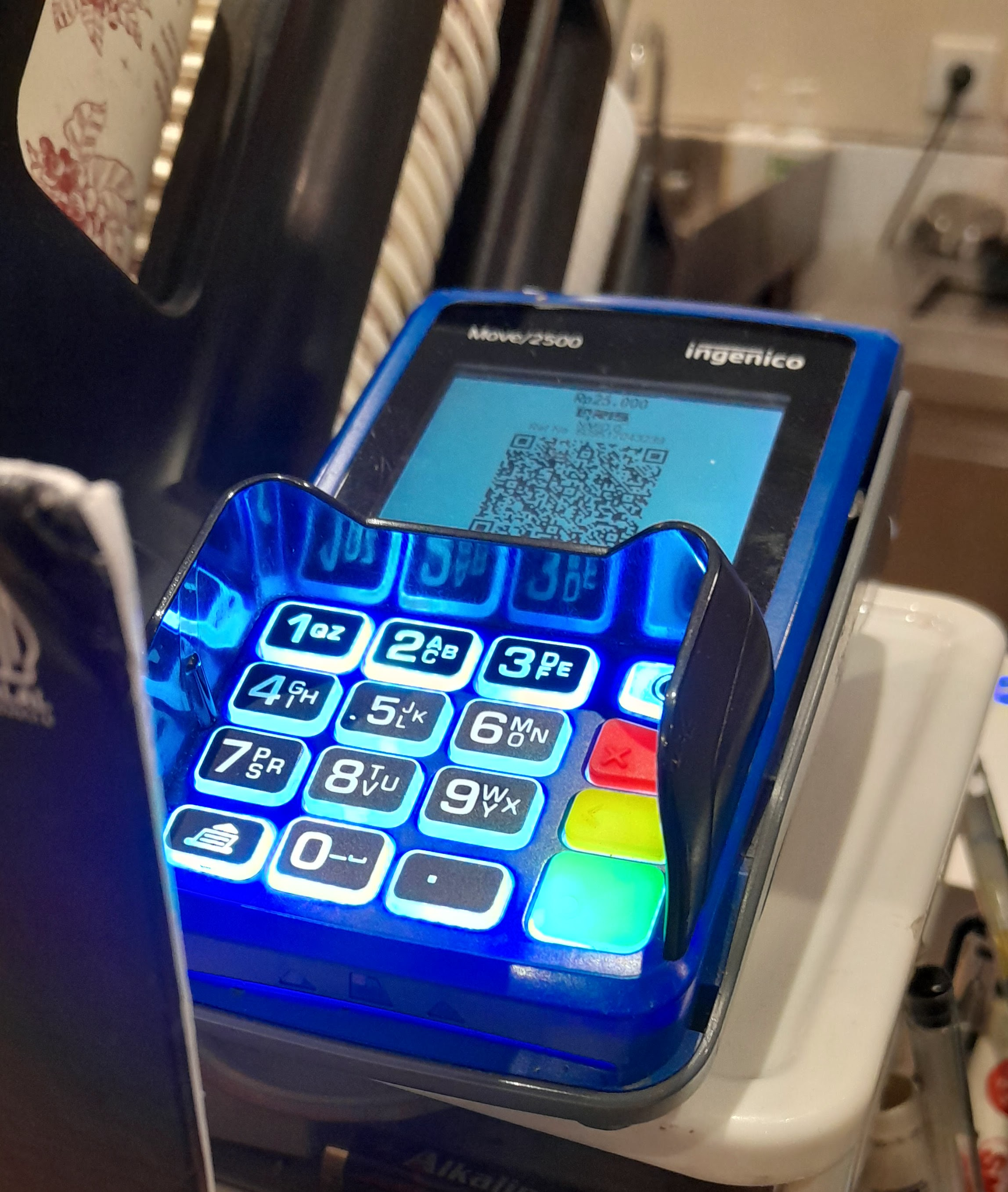
Ingenico Move/2500 payment terminal showing QRIS QR code payment

Ingenico was founded in France by Jean-Jacques Poutrel and Michel Malhouitre in 1980. It is headquartered in Suresnes, France.

In 2008, after the merger resulting in The Ingenium Group, Ingenico closed its R&D centre in Barcelona. This centre developed Ingenico's suite of EFTPOS (Electronic funds transfer at point of sale). In 2008, Ingenico acquired 55% of Fujian Landi, a Chinese EFTPOS vendor.

In 2009, Ingenico partnered with its two largest competitors, Hypercom and VeriFone, to found the Secure POS Vendor Alliance, a non-profit organization whose goal is to increase awareness of and improve payment industry security. Ingenico acquired German payment processor Easycash in 2009 for €290 million.

In 2011, Ingenico integrated Pennies, the electronic charity box, into one of their mobile Chip and PIN payment terminals, allowing retailers to use the Pennies technology so that customers can add a micro-donation (1p-99p) to their bill when paying electronically.

In July 2017, Ingenico bought Swedish payments group Bambora for €1.5bn in order to facilitate the development of its retail division through a direct-to-SMB channel in Nordic countries and to expand into other new markets.

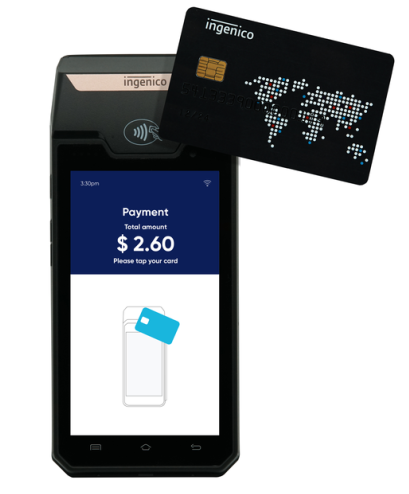
Ingenico AXIUM DX4000

In October 2017, Ingenico expanded its direct-to-retail channel in Spain with the acquisition of IECISA Electronic Payment System.

In December 2017, Ingenico acquired Airlink to expand its Asian reach.

In August 2019, Ingenico Group partnered with IKEA to facilitate digital payments on the retailer's ecommerce platform in India.

In February 2020, financial services company Worldline announced it was acquiring Ingenico for €7.8 billion.

In May 2021, Worldline acquired 92.5% of Cardlink, a network services provider in Greece, for €130 million.

On 21 February 2022, it was announced that Worldline had entered exclusive talks with Apollo Global Management for the sale of its Terminals, Solutions & Services business line (including Ingenico) for a consideration of €2.3 billion, with the transaction closing on 3 October 2022.

In March 2023, Ingenico announced its acquisition of Phos, a provider of software-only Point of Sales solutions.

In April 2026, Bloomberg News reported that Ingenico had begun discussions with its creditors over its debt, as the company was struggling to meet its interest payments.

== Ogone ==
Ogone was a Belgium-based online payment service provider and payment risk management company that has been part of Ingenico since 2013. After the acquisition, Ingenico renamed the business Ingenico Payment Services. Ogone managed and secured online payments for card-not-present transactions (e-commerce, m-commerce, mail/telephone order, batch payments) and provided fraud prevention services. Ogone, was connected through certified links with more than 200 banks and acquirers and provided international, alternative and local payment methods in over 80 countries in Europe, Asia, Latin America and the Middle East and in 2014 had 77,000 clients. The company was headquartered in Belgium and had operations in India and regional offices in Belgium, the Netherlands, France, Germany, Austria, Switzerland, UK, United Arab Emirates and the US.

In May 2010 the company received an undisclosed majority investment from US-based growth equity firm Summit Partners. The purchase of EBS (E-Billing Solutions) in September 2011, at the time the second largest payment provider in India after CC-Avenues, was Ogone's first acquisition and its first move outside the European market.

On 29 January 2013, Ingenico announced an agreement for the acquisition of Ogone. A share purchase agreement for the acquisition was executed two months later for 360 million euro.

== Products ==
Ingenico develops payment terminals and point-of-sale systems used in retail and other commercial environments.

== Ingenico Payment Services ==
On 4 June 2014 Ogone announced that Ogone was becoming Ingenico Payment Services, the Ingenico Group's flagship brand for digital payment services. All activities were to be structured around three major brands: Ingenico Smart Terminals, Ingenico Mobile Solutions and Ingenico Payment Services. Ingenico Payment Services groups the activities of acquisitions made by Ingenico over the past years, including Ogone, TUNZ, easycash, easycash Loyalty Solutions and AXIS (not to be confused with India's AxisBank).

Ingenico develops several payment terminal families that have received wide global deployment. The Lane Series (Lane/3000/5000/7000/8000) is documented in FCC filings, including the Lane/3000 in 2018. The AXIUM DX8000 was launched in 2023 and represents a next-generation Android-based point-of-sale payment terminal.

== See also ==
- List of online payment service providers
