= Worldline SA =

French financial services company

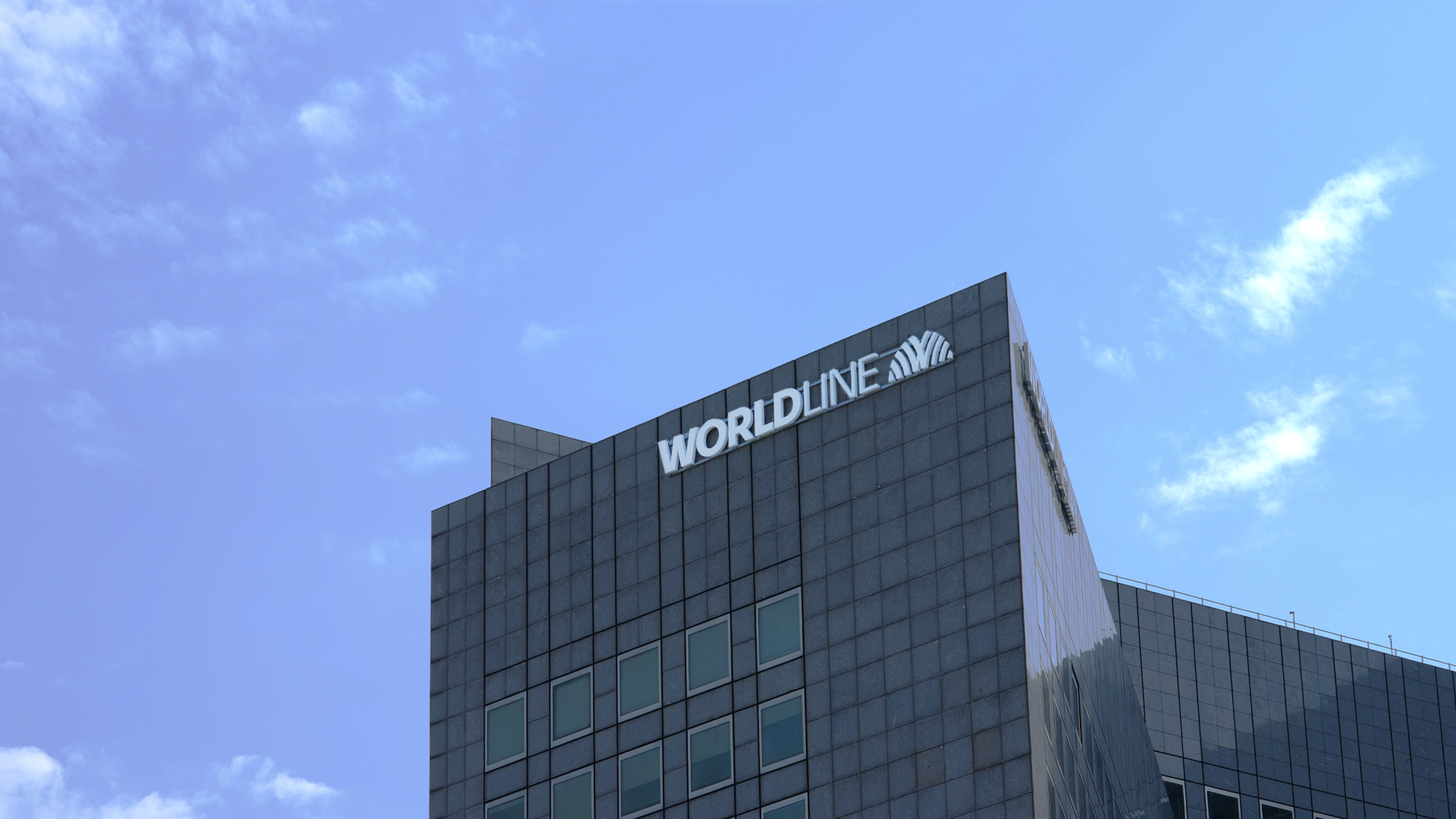
- Type: Public (Société Anonyme)
- Traded as: Euronext Paris: WLN; CAC Mid 60
- ISIN: FR0011981968
- Industry: data processing, hosting and related activities
- Founded: 1972; 54 years ago
- Headquarters: La Défense, France
- Key people: Wilfried Verstraete (Chairman); Pierre-Antoine Vacheron (CEO)
- Products: Merchant Services; Financial Services and Mobility & e-Transactional Services
- Revenue: ▲€4.63 billion (2024)
- Net income: ▲€-297 million (2024) (net income Group share)
- Number of employees: c. 18,000 (2022)
- Website: Worldline.com; Investors.worldline.com

Worldline SA is a French payment processing company founded in 1972. In 2024 its revenue was €4.63 billion.

== History ==
=== 1972–2004: beginnings and diversification ===
Worldline's first activities in processing payment card transactions date back to the 1970s, first under the name of Sligos - resulting from the merger in 1973 between Sliga, a subsidiary of the Crédit Lyonnais bank, and Cegos - then, from the 1980s, with Segin, specializing in particular in transactions on Minitel. From the 1990s, the company diversified into online payments with Axime, which gave birth - after its merger with Sligos - to Atos Group.

=== 2004–2014: integration into Atos ===
In 2004, Atos integrated its payment and online services activities into a division then called Atos Worldline.

In 2006, Atos Worldline included in its scope the Belgian companies Banksys, responsible for securing and guaranteeing electronic payments in Belgium, and Bank Card Company (BCC), specializing in the management of payment systems linked to the country's two largest credit card networks, Visa and MasterCard. The two companies, employing around 1,100 people with a turnover of €309 million, were bought out from their four shareholders: Dexia, Fortis, ING, and KBC.

In 2010, Atos Worldline acquired and integrated the Indian company Venture Infotek for around $100 million. The company, specializing in payment and transaction processing, had merchants, as well as banks and government programs, as clients locally.

In 2011, Atos acquired the IT services activities of Siemens, which also included electronic transaction activities, which were integrated into its Worldline division. In 2012, Atos Worldline acquired and integrated Quality Equipment, a Dutch electronic payment company, for an unknown amount.

In 2013, Atos branched out its Atos Worldline division, giving it more autonomy.

In 2014, Atos partially listed Worldline for 26.59% of its holdings, worth €575 million, valuing Worldline at €2.1 billion.

=== 2014–2019: consolidator of European payments ===
In November 2015, Worldline merged its electronic financial transaction processing activities with Equens, a Dutch company. As part of this merger, Worldline paid out 72 million euros and owned 63.6% of the created equensWorldline Company, the rest being held by the shareholders of Equens, Dutch, German and Italian banks. In the context of this merger, Worldline acquired the possibility in the long term to acquire the remaining shares of these banks.

In July 2017, Worldline announced the acquisition of the Swedish company Digital River World Payments (DRWP) for an undisclosed amount. The company, founded in 1997 and based in Stockholm, generated annual sales of $37 million.

Next, Worldline acquired First Data Baltics, a subsidiary of First Data Corp in Lithuania, Latvia, and Estonia for approximately €73 million. These three subsidiaries generated a turnover of €23 million in 2016, employing around 200 people.

In May 2018, Worldline acquired SIX Payment Services (Europe) SA, the payment services division of the Swiss group SIX, for €2.3 billion, mainly financed by the issue of new shares. With the integration of SIX Payment Services' 1,600 employees and merchant acquisition activities and services serving more than 200,000 merchants for an income of around €530 million, Worldline gained a 30% increase in turnover as well as a number one place in Switzerland, Austria, and Luxembourg. Worldline's ambition through this operation was to create a European payment champion.

In January 2019, Atos, which then had a 50.8% stake, announced the sale by an exchange of shares of a 23.4% stake in Worldline to its shareholders.

=== Since 2019: independent company and recent evolutions ===
In May 2019, Worldline gained independence when Atos' shareholders approved the plan to redistribute 23.4% of Worldline shares to their investors. Atos still remained Worldline's main shareholder at 27% just ahead of the SIX Group but lost the possibility to control its finances.

In September 2019, Worldline announced the completion of the acquisition of the 36.4% minority interest in equensWorldline, hence becoming the sole owner of equensWorldline.

In February 2020, Worldline announced the acquisition of Ingenico, the world leader in payments POS market and in merchant services, for €7.8 billion. The shareholders of Worldline would retain a 65% stake and those of Ingenico 35%. Following this announcement, Atos announced the sale of a 13.1% stake, keeping only a 3.8% stake in Worldline. In parallel, Bpifrance announced the increase of its stake in the company.

In March 2020, Worldline entered the CAC 40, the flagship index of the Paris stock market, which mainly reflected the evolution of the Group's liquidity and market capitalization from €2.2 billion in June 2014 at the time of its listing on the stock exchange to more than €11 billion when it entered the CAC 40.

In April 2020, Worldline announced the acquisition of GoPay through the purchase of 53% of its shares. The company also announced the contemplated purchase of all remaining shares for 2022. GoPay is a specialist in online payments in Eastern Europe. Through this acquisition, Worldline intended to reinforce its offers to merchants and to strengthen its position in Eastern and Central Europe.

In May 2020, its CEO Gilles Grapinet announced the creation of EDPIA (the European Digital Payment Industry Alliance), a professional organization bringing together the main European companies specializing in electronic payments (Ingenico, Nets, Nexi, and Worldline), and which has set itself the objective of better coordinating the representation of major industrialists in the sector with European authorities and other stakeholders in the payments ecosystem. Gilles Grapinet is its first president.

In July 2021, the Group announced the purchase of 80% of Axepta Italy, a subsidiary of BNP Paribas, for 180 million euros.

In October 2021, Worldline announced its Q3 2021 revenue and, as planned at the time of the Ingenico's acquisition, the new governance of the Group was implemented by the Board of Directors, with Bernard Bourigeaud appointed as Chairman while Gilles Grapinet remains CEO.

In March 2022, Worldline, announced its business expansion to Japan, offering credit card payment processing for merchants nationwide.

In February 2022, Worldline announced that it had entered into exclusive negotiations with the Apollo funds for the sale of its subsidiary TSS, which had taken over Ingenico's payment terminal activities, for 2.3 billion euros. In April 2022, Worldline announces the acquisition of a 51% stake in ANZ Bank's electronic payments business for A$925 million.

In April 2023, Crédit Agricole and Worldline enter into exclusive discussions to create a major player in merchant services in France. Both groups announce the contemplated creation of a joint company fully operational by 2025 combining Crédit Agricole's merchant acquiring footprint, French market intimacy and distribution power with Worldline's leading innovation, technology and global infrastructure. In January 2024, Crédit Agricole SA acquired a minority stake of 7%.

On 13 June 2024, at Worldline's Annual General Meeting and as announced on 21 March 2024, the Board of Directors decided, on the recommendation of the Nomination Committee, to appoint Mr Wilfried Verstraete as Chairman of the Board of Directors.

On 30 September, Gilles Grapinet stepped down as CEO and director of the company and Worldline is looking for a new CEO who will work with the Board of Directors to determine a new strategic plan. Marc-Henri Desportes, previously Worldline Deputy CEO and Head of Merchant Services, is acting as interim CEO.

In November 2024 it became public that Worldline considers selling its Mobility and e-Transactional Services (MTS) business.

On 1 March 2025, Pierre-Antoine Vacheron was appointed CEO, succeeding Marc-Henri Desportes.

In June 2025 a network of international press researchers, operating under the name "Dirty Payments", accused the company of handling billions of euros in fraudulent or unethical payments over decades, using subsidiaries. The German based Payone, of which Worldline SA held 60%, was accused in 2023 by the German Federal Financial Supervisory Authority of dealing with high risk customers, prone to Money laundering. Payone, by its own account, then cut ties with these customers in summer 2023, but they were apparently just handed over to another Worldline subsidiary, according to the researchers. Dutch investigators accused the company of continuing to work with customers, who had been identified by Worldlines own risk assessment as problematic. The publication of the findings caused Worldlines share price on 25 June 2025 to fall by 21%.

== Communication ==
=== Visual identity ===
Logo until September 2021

Logo since September 2021

== Activities ==
Worldline's revenue was divided, in 2024, as follows:

- Merchant services (73.1%)
- Financial services (19.4%)
- Mobility & transactional web services (7.5%)

=== New payment methods ===
In spring 2017, Worldline developed in collaboration with the Belgian bank Belfius the first smartphone payment application in Belgium.

Worldline also operates Saferpay.

== Management ==
- Chairman (since June 2024): Wilfried Verstraete
- CEO (since March 2025): Pierre-Antoine Vacheron

== Shareholders ==
List of main shareholders as of 31 December 2024.

Free float	76.1%
SIX Group AG	10.5%
Crédit Agricole	7.0%
Bpifrance	5.0%
Employees	0.8%
Board of Directors & Senior Executives	0.1%
Worldline SA	0.5%

== Criticism ==
Worldline has come under criticism for maintaining its operations linked to Russia despite the country's invasion of Ukraine. While the company states that its business in Russia accounts for only a small portion of its revenue and is operated from outside the country, this continued engagement has drawn scrutiny amid international efforts to isolate Russia economically. Critics argue that such actions contradict global sanctions and ethical considerations, as the war in Ukraine persists with devastating consequences for civilians.
