= List of Federal Court of Australia cases =

The following is a list of notable cases that have been considered by the Federal Court of Australia.

Year	Case	Area of law	Comment
1979	Drake v Minister for Immigration & Ethnic Affairs	Immigration	
1984	Hunter Valley Developments Pty Ltd v Cohen		
1994	Milpurrurru v Indofurn Pty Ltd		
1999	Nulyarimma v Thompson		
2001	Telstra Corporation Ltd v Desktop Marketing Systems Pty Ltd	Copyright	
2001	Ruddock v Vadarlis	Immigration	
2002	We Two Pty Ltd v Shorrock		
2003	Commissioner of Taxation v La Rosa	Taxation	Money from drug-dealing was assessable income; expenses incurred in drug-dealing were deductible.
2005	Wotjobaluk, Jaadwa, Jadawadjali, Wergaia and Jupagulk Peoples v Victoria	Native title	First successful native title claim in south-eastern Australia
2007	Silberberg v The Builders Collective of Australia Inc		Liability of Internet forum operators for racial vilification
2007	Forestry Tasmania v Brown	Environmental law	
2010	Keech v Metropolitan Health Service	Anti-discrimination	
2010	ACCC v Cabcharge Australia Ltd	Competition and consumer law	Cabcharge admitted to predatory pricing and was fined $15 million.
2010	Getup Ltd v Electoral Commissioner	Electoral law	
2011	Eatock v Bolt	Anti-discrimination	
2011	Roadshow Films Pty Ltd v iiNet Ltd		
2016	Wotton v Queensland (No 5) (Palm Island class action)	Anti-discrimination	The excessive and disproportionate response of the Queensland Police Service was racial discrimination.
2017	Director of Consumer Affairs Victoria v Gibson	Competition and consumer law	Wellness blogger Belle Gibson made misleading and deceptive claims to have cancer, contrary to the Australian Consumer Law
2021	Barilaro v Shanks-Markovina		
2023	ASIC v GetSwift Ltd	Competition and consumer law	Businessmen Joel Macdonald and Bane Hunter were awarded Australia's largest ever penalties for breaching continuous disclosure rules

== See also ==
- List of High Court of Australia cases
