= Taxis of Australia =

Transportation in form of taxicabs in Australia

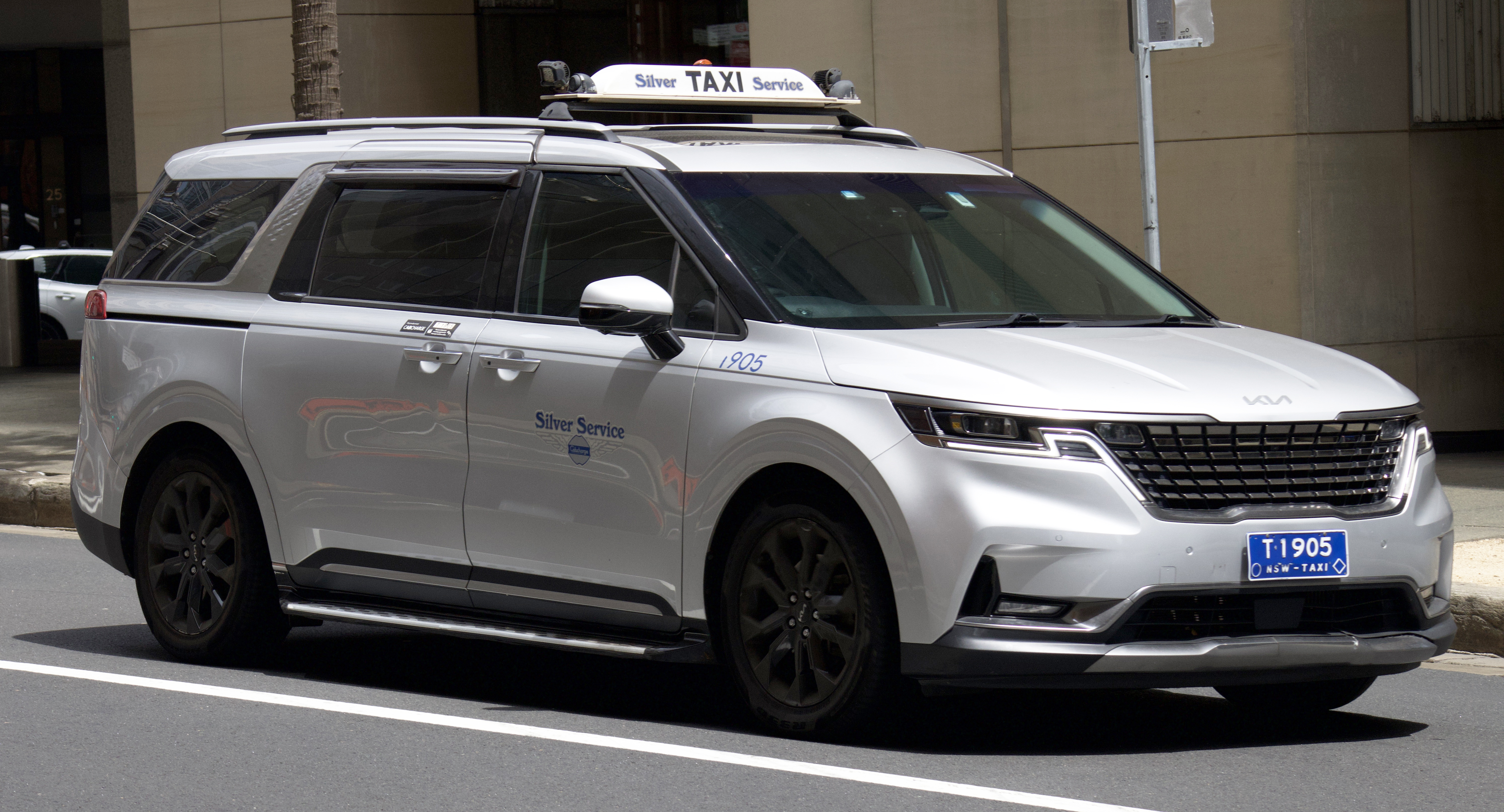
Silver Service taxi, New South Wales

Taxis in Australia are highly regulated by each Australian state and territory, with each state and territory having its own history and structure. In December 2014, there were 21,344 taxis in Australia. Taxis in Australia are required to be licensed and are typically required to operate and charge on a fitted taximeter. Taxi fare rates are set by State or Territory governments. A vehicle without a meter is generally not considered to be a taxi, and may be described, for example, as a hire car, limousine, carpool, etc. Most taxis today are fueled by liquid petroleum gas. A2B Australia owns and operates the Cabcharge payment system, which covers 98% of taxis in Australia, and operates one of Australia's largest taxi networks.

Taxi services are particularly valuable to less mobile groups in the community, such as elderly and disabled people. As a result, government intervention has historically ensured that taxi services have assisted in ensuring equity, reliability, quality, and safety. At the same time, regulation has created barriers to entry and limited competition in the sector. In April 1995, the Federal and all State and Territory governments entered into the Competition Principles Agreement that required all jurisdictions to review legislation which restricts competition by the year 2000. As a result of pressures from competition law, the Competition and Consumer Act 2010 (and preceding legislation), and evolving technology, the regulated industry is facing challenges from deregulated vehicle for hire companies including Uber.

== Brief history ==
Australia adopted horse-drawn taxis once cities were established and, in the case of Queensland, Brisbane introduced the first horse-drawn taxis, which plied throughout the city. These also included hansom cabs, a more elaborate type with a closed-in cabin for passengers with two small front doors and glass windows and their driver sitting high at the back. This type of vehicle was a standard type used in England. Hansom cabs were used in Brisbane until 1935, operating from a rank outside the Supreme Court in George Street.

Motor taxis were introduced into Australia not long after they were put into service in the United Kingdom and Europe. In 1906 Sydney inaugurated motorised taxis, followed soon after by the other states.

The taxis of the period included a variety of types, with tourers and sedans. The latter were mainly French built Renaults, which were designed as taxis, not unlike the hansom cabs. Brisbane had a number of them that plied from the ranks outside Parliament House, Brisbane in Alice Street, and the Supreme Court of Queensland building in George Street. As applied to the hansom cabs, the Renaults catered mainly for gentlemen of standing, including judges, barristers and other notables. The drivers wore uniforms with leggings, the same as those worn by chauffeurs of horse-drawn carriages.

Each large taxi company had telephones installed in a steel box type cover at city and suburban ranks, direct to the switch control rooms in the city.

Although motor vehicle taxis were being used at the time, a few horse-drawn taxis continued service in Brisbane until the early 1920s. Country towns had them for a while longer.

The progress through the years included many types of tourers from circa 1910 until the late 1920s, with British and American cars predominating. Makes featured such names as Buick, Dodge, Talbot, Vauxhall, Saxon, Ford, Chandler, Studebaker, Chevrolet, Hupmobile, Whippet, Oldsmobile, Marmon, Pontiac, Hudson, Oakland, Erskine, Rugby, Essex and Chrysler.

Sedans were added during the late 1920s and included similar makes of vehicles. This was the case with all cars being imported into Australia until World War II. American cars proved more suitable to Australian motoring conditions, especially for taxis. General Motors built thousands in Australia, as did the other American companies including Ford and Chrysler.

== Current industry structure by state or territory ==
=== New South Wales ===
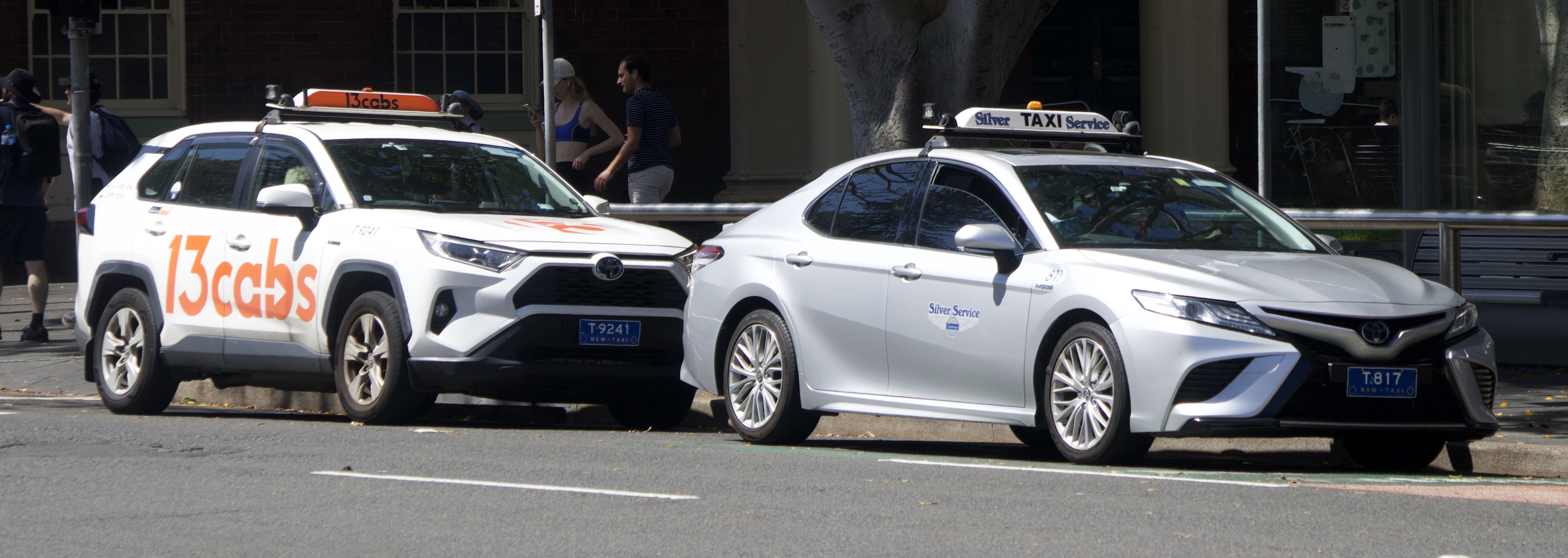
Toyota RAV4 13CABs and Toyota Camry Silver Service.

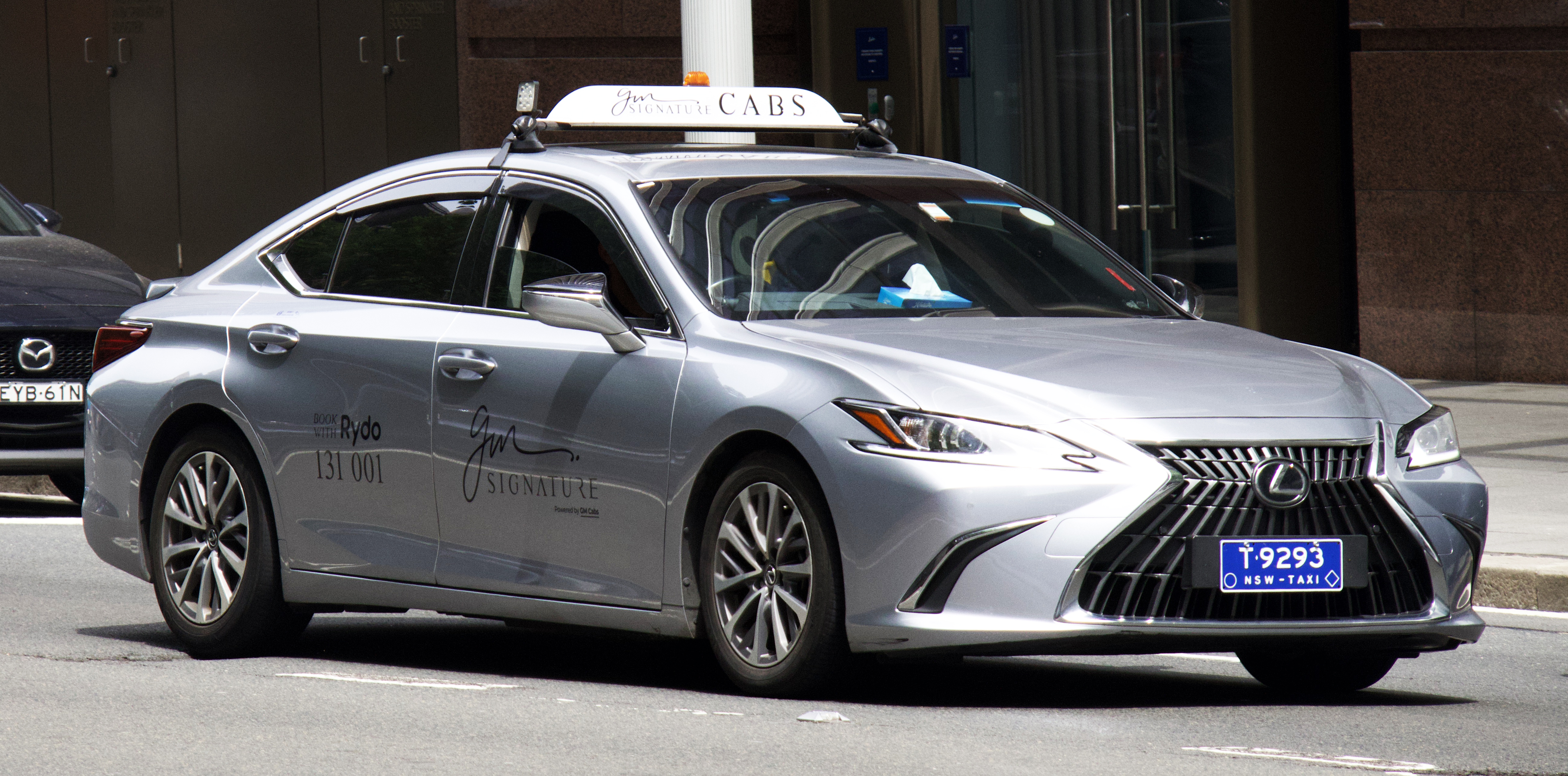
GM Taxis Lexus ES.

New South Wales is served by around 6,000 taxis, and the industry employs over 22,700 taxi drivers, the largest number of taxis and drivers in Australia.

In general, individual taxis are owned by small-scale operators who pay membership fees to regional or citywide radio communication networks. These networks provide branding as well as telephone and internet booking services to operators and drivers.

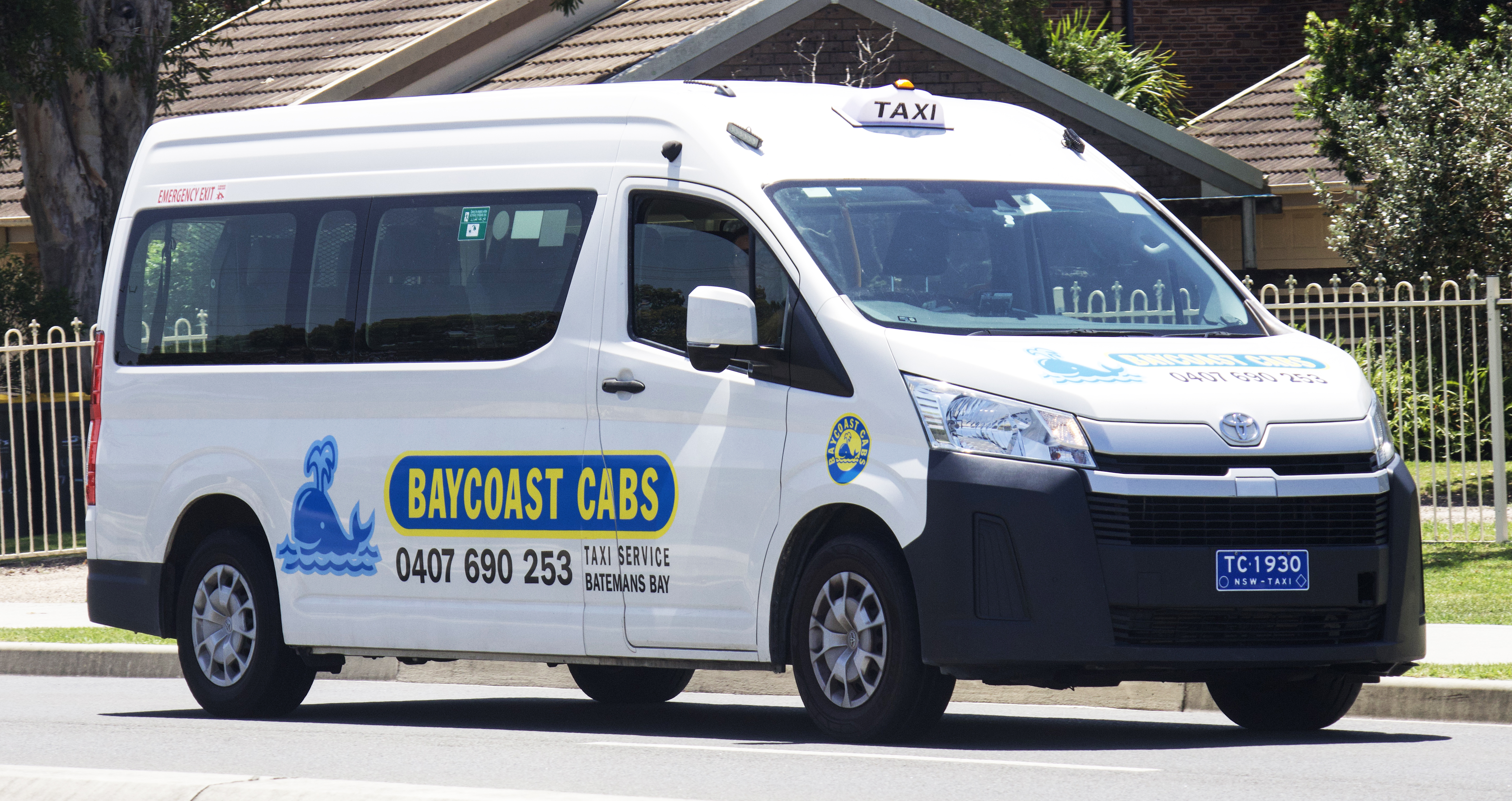
Baycoast cabs Toyota HiAce commuter in Batemans Bay, New South Wales.

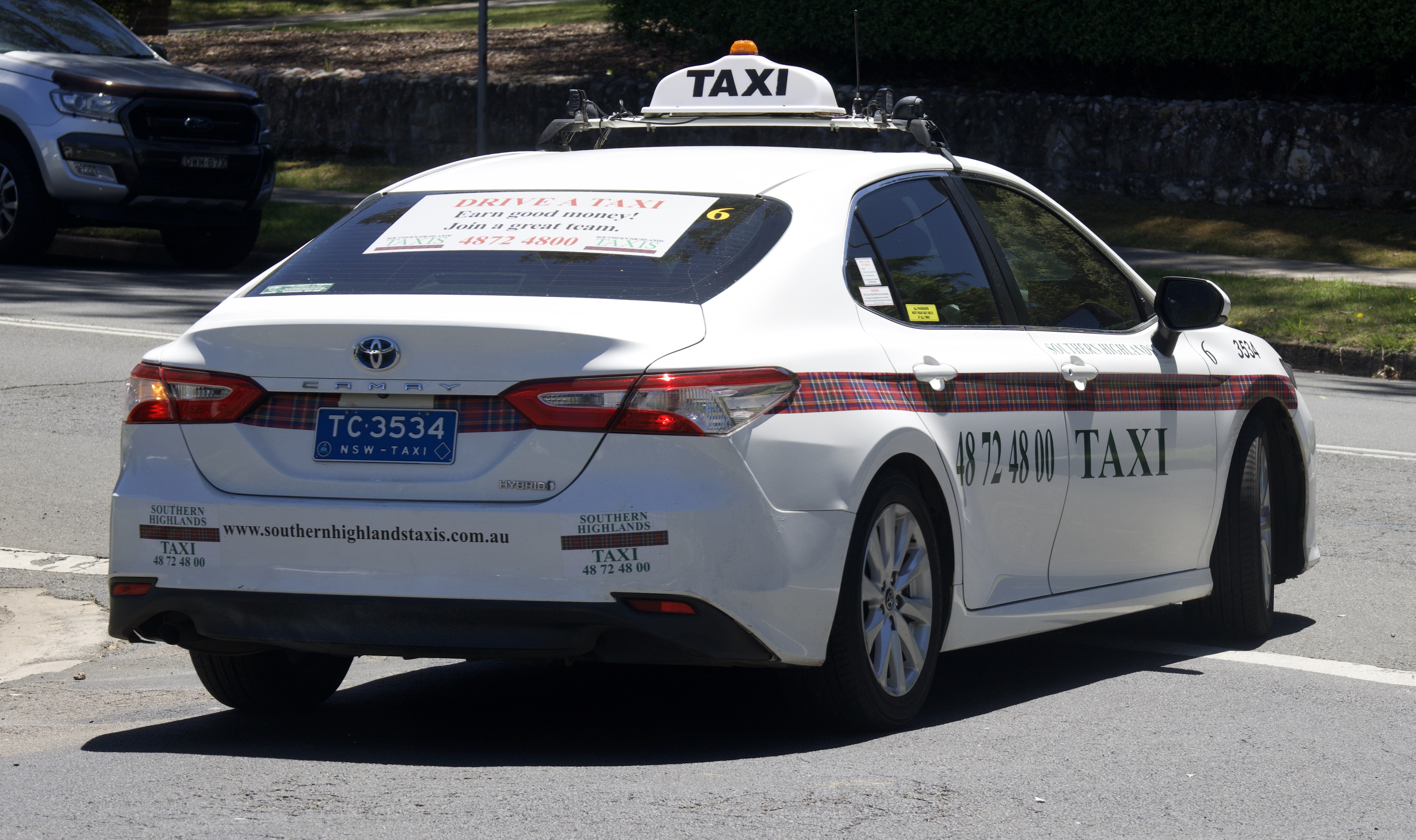
Southern Highlands Toyota Camry in country New South Wales.

Fares are set by the Independent Pricing and Regulatory Tribunal of New South Wales (IPART). Other aspects of the industry are regulated by the Transport for NSW. The industry plays a self-regulating role through the New South Wales Taxi Council.

Vehicle operators are represented by the New South Wales Taxi Industry Association and, in country New South Wales, by the New South Wales Country Operators Association. Drivers are represented by the New South Wales Taxi Drivers Association. The New South Wales Transport Workers Union purports to represent taxi drivers. Most regional centers have a local taxi network.

=== Queensland ===
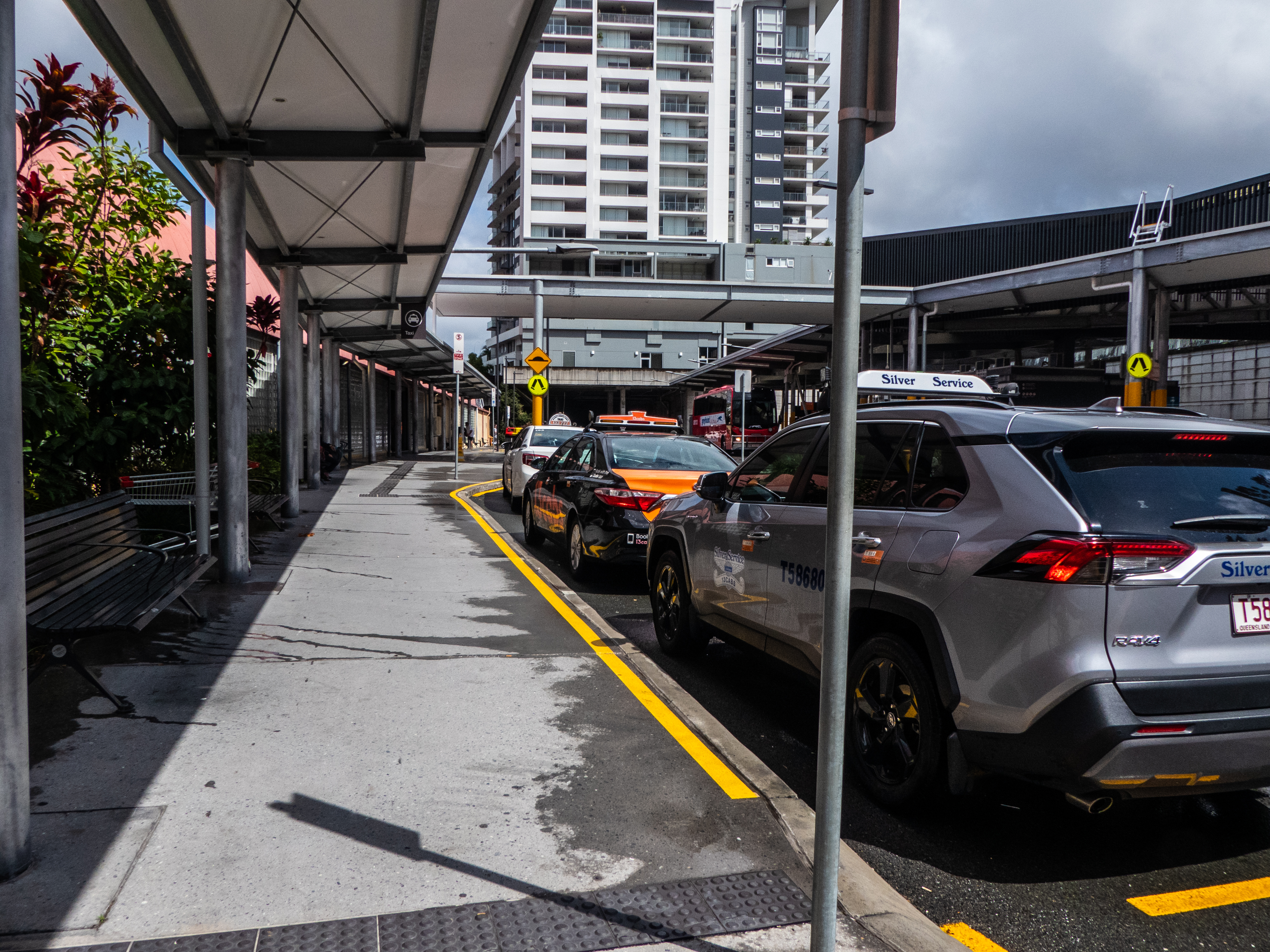
Line of Brisbane taxis

There are numerous taxi services throughout Queensland which operate in all main city centers, as far north as Thursday Island off North Queensland.

Prior to a taxi company being formed in Queensland, owners of taxis simply had signs on the vehicles indicating "For Hire" painted on the side, front and rear. Before 1924, all taxis plied for hire without a means of recording the mileage, other than the driver himself calculating the fare according to how far he drove his passengers. There was a fare scale, however, the driver could charge whatever he thought was nearest to the amount specified. This no doubt, brought about the introduction of meters.

The first taxi company in Queensland was Ascot Taxi Service which was formed in 1919 in Brisbane by two motor mechanics, Edmund William Henry Beckman and Edward Roland Videan. In 1924, the Yellow Cab Company imported their taxis from the United States, which were built especially for taxi work by the Yellow Cab Company in Chicago. The vehicle was the A2 Brougham (mustard pots)—a sedan with the driver separated from the passengers by a window with the baggage compartment in front beside him. The meter was alongside the window by the driver's side. The taxis were also the first fitted with meters in Australia. The vehicle was known as a yellow cab, having been built by the company with that name plate on the front of the radiator. The engines were also built especially for the type and were similar to the Willys Knight. The driver's compartment did not have side windows. The Broughams were taken out of service in 1936.

The Yellow Cab Company has now become the largest cab fleet in Brisbane and introduced the first computerized data dispatch from the control room to taxis. The system was designed to increase efficiency and provide a better and safer service for the public and increase drivers' security. The computers have been installed into the fleet of over 580 taxis.

The Taxi Council of Queensland is the trade association and its objective is to expand the total market for taxi services.

=== Victoria ===
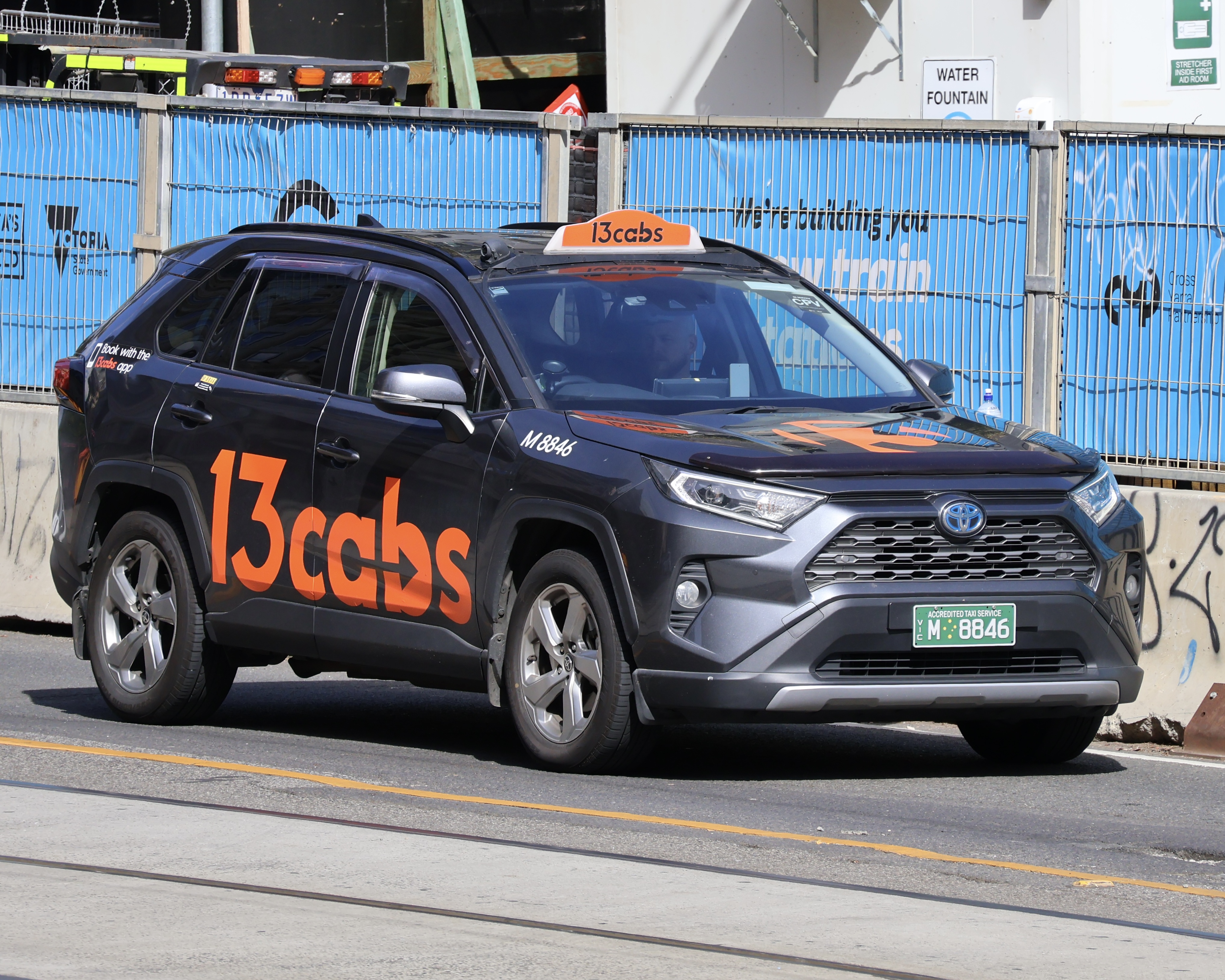
Toyota RAV4, 13CABS (regular service)

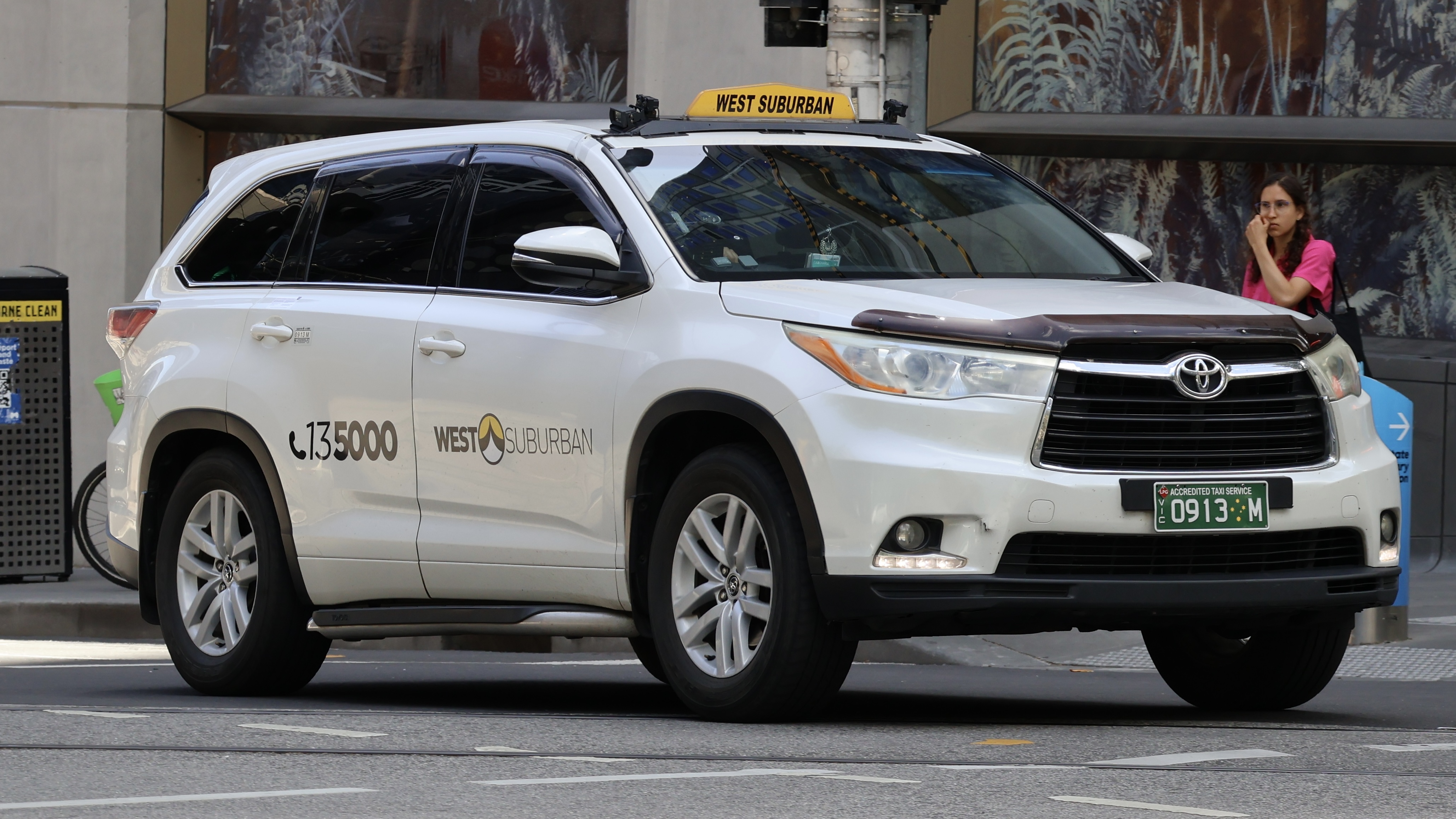
Toyota Kluger, West Suburban Taxis (regular service)

Taxis and private hire cars are a part of public transport in Victoria. In December 2014, there were 5,778 taxis in Victoria. Each taxi is required to be licensed and one vehicle only is permitted to operate on each license. The number of licenses issued is restricted, but transfers of a license can take place. License fees were abolished in 2018.

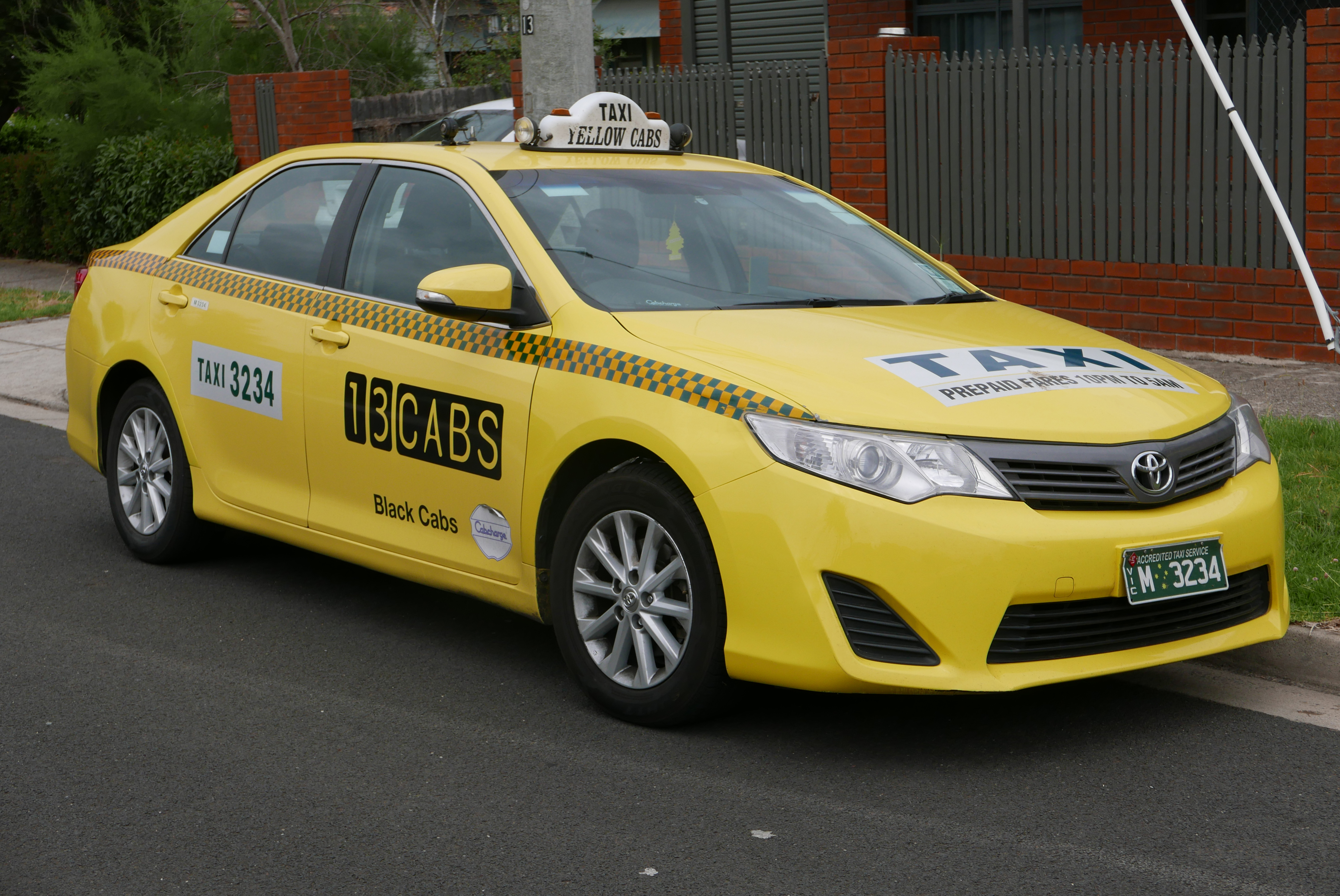
Some Melbourne taxicabs continue to operate in the yellow colour

Eight taxi license holders own and control more than 10 licenses. The largest license holders are A2B Australia and the Gange Corporation, both of which hold licenses under a variety of names. A2B Australia also operates the 13cabs booking network, and the Gange Corporation operates the Silver Top Taxis booking network. These companies are the two main network service providers in the greater Melbourne area. Taxi operators pay the booking service an affiliation fee.

More than 60% of licenses are assigned (or leased or rented) to taxi operators, who pay the license holder assignment fees. These fees fluctuate, and typically are in the order of $24,000 per annum. The operator owns, maintains and operates the taxi vehicle as well as the taximeter. Taxi operators may drive their taxis or may employ drivers. In June 2016 there were 14,771 active taxi drivers. Taxi drivers are required to be registered, and their registration certificate must be displayed in the taxi. A taxi operator can sell the taxi, comprising the assigned license, vehicle and meter, as a going concern. Besides receiving the assignment fees from the taxi operator, license holders also commonly benefit from capital growth in license values, or carry the risk of a decline in the market value of a license.

Concern about the availability and quality of taxis continues to be a major public issue in Victoria.

Significant reforms were made to the industry in 1994 under the Kennett Government, including taxis being required to be painted canary yellow. In 2002, peak service taxis, which must be yellow and a green top, were introduced to operate at night, between 3 pm and 7 am, and at special events only. In 2013, the taxi regulations were relaxed to allow colours other than yellow.

The taxi industry in Victoria was the subject of a major government inquiry, the Taxi Industry Inquiry in 2011.

The market value of a taxi license fluctuates over time. They were estimated to be valued at around $464,000, in October 2008. In April 2011, metropolitan taxi licenses had an approximate market value of $512,500. In June 2016 the approximate market value of a metro license was $158,688. Taxi licenses were abolished in 2018, and license holders are to be compensated at a cost of $494 million.

In 2008, there were 3,774 licensed taxis in Melbourne, including 235 wheelchair accessible taxis. In 2011, there were 5,045 taxi licenses across Victoria, including 502 wheelchair accessible taxis. In December 2014, there were 5,778 taxis in Victoria. More recently, the number of taxi licenses were:

Number of taxi licenses
	September 2015	June 2016
Metropolitan	4,812	4,660 including 443 wheelchair accessible taxis
Urban	488	505 including 85 wheelchair accessible taxis
Regional	335	336 including 72 wheelchair accessible taxis
Country	162	162 including 35 wheelchair accessible taxis
Total	5,797	5,663 including 635 wheelchair accessible taxis

In 2018, Uber, DiDi, Shofer, Taxify, GoCatch, Shebah, and Ola Cabs were legalized in Victoria. Taxi licenses were abolished and license holders are to be compensated by an 8-year A$1 levy on all taxi and ride-booking services in Victoria.

==== Regulatory scheme ====
Victoria does not have a dedicated industry statute covering the taxi industry. The prime operational statute for the taxi industry is the Transport (Compliance and Miscellaneous) Act 1983. Part 6 of that Act contains the key provisions regulating the taxi industry including provisions relating to licensing, accreditation and compliance. The overarching Transport Integration Act 2010 (TIA) is a key piece of legislation. It both establishes the taxi industry regulator, the Director of Public Transport, and contains a set of high level policy objectives and principles which the regulator must have regard to when exercising functions including licensing and accreditation decisions. In practice, the Director delegates taxi industry functions to the general manager of the Victorian Taxi Directorate. Another key operational legislative instrument is the Transport (Taxi-cab) Regulations 2005.

The Taxi Industry Inquiry of 2011 resulted in major reforms to Victoria's taxi industry and has had a far reaching impact on taxi services in Melbourne and beyond. The Transport Legislation Amendment (Taxi Services Reform and Other Matters) Act 2011 created the Taxi Services Commission to regulate the taxi industry. The Commission commenced its role on 1 July 2013 and began operations on 19 July. Accreditation requirements apply to a number of key parties in the taxi industry.

==== Taxi Talk ====
Taxi Talk Magazine – Voice of the Taxi Industry – was the first ever magazine dedicated solely to the Victorian taxi industry. The first edition was delivered to depots on 1 May 1966, and each issue was a small pocket size magazine, 8 in × 5 in (200 mm × 130 mm), until Taxi Talk became a B5 colour magazine produced monthly. With collaborations from all sectors of the industry, the magazine kept taxi owners, operators, drivers, industry suppliers, service trade providers, associations and government interested people up to date with the latest news within the Victorian taxi industry.

In April 2017, Taxi Talk was rebranded to represent the taxi industry on a national level and developed into DRIVE NOW (previously DRIVE A2B) Magazine, the new Voice of the Australian Commercial Passenger Transport Industry. In September 2018, DRIVE NOW printed its first issue, and since has featured information on the Australian taxi industry for every State and Territory in Australia.

=== Tasmania ===
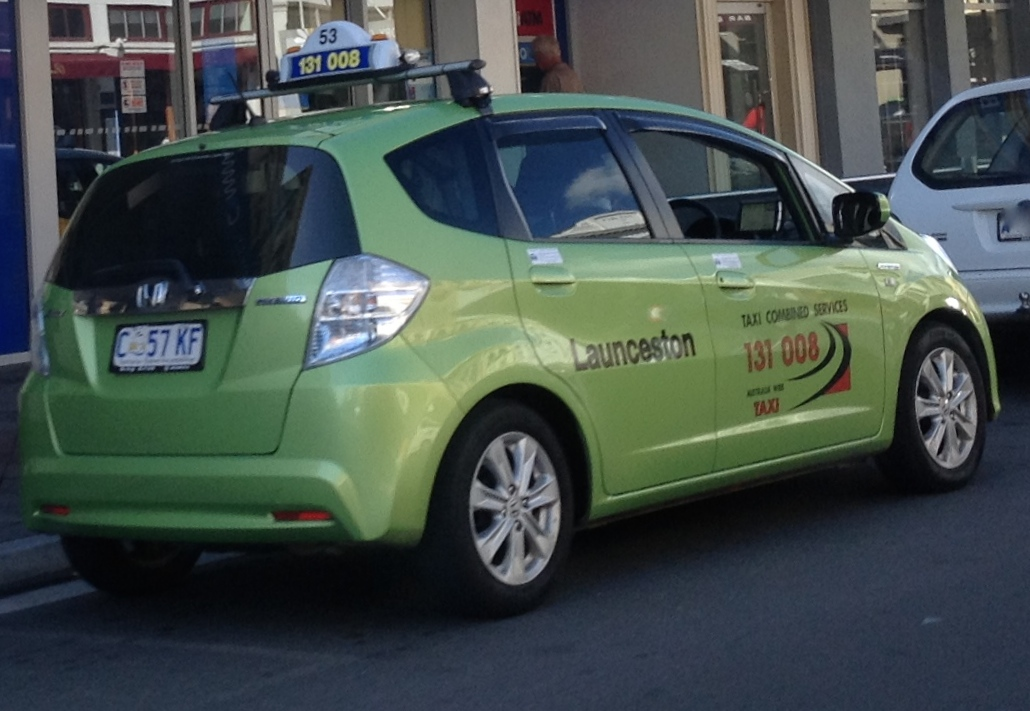
Honda Jazz Hybrid taxicab in Launceston

As at 19 February 2009, there are 448 perpetual, 8 owner-operator and 45 wheelchair accessible taxi licenses on issue in Tasmania. The industry employs over 1,000 taxi drivers: some owner-drivers and most drivers on a bailiff agreement commission basis.

There are 3 main providers in Hobart – 131008 Hobart, Taxi Combined and Yellow Cabs. 131008 Hobart alone service over 50% of Hobart's immediate population. The remainder of the industry consists of smaller fleet operators with several licenses each and the rest are owner-operators. The location of taxi ranks in the southern district are around the main CBD area, with many others in suburbs close to Hobart.

The Tasmanian Taxi Association began publishing a quarterly industry newsletter "TTA Taxi Talk" in December 2008. In October 2008 Yellow Cabs began operating their first Toyota Prius, becoming Tasmania's first taxi company to run hybrid vehicles.

=== Western Australia ===
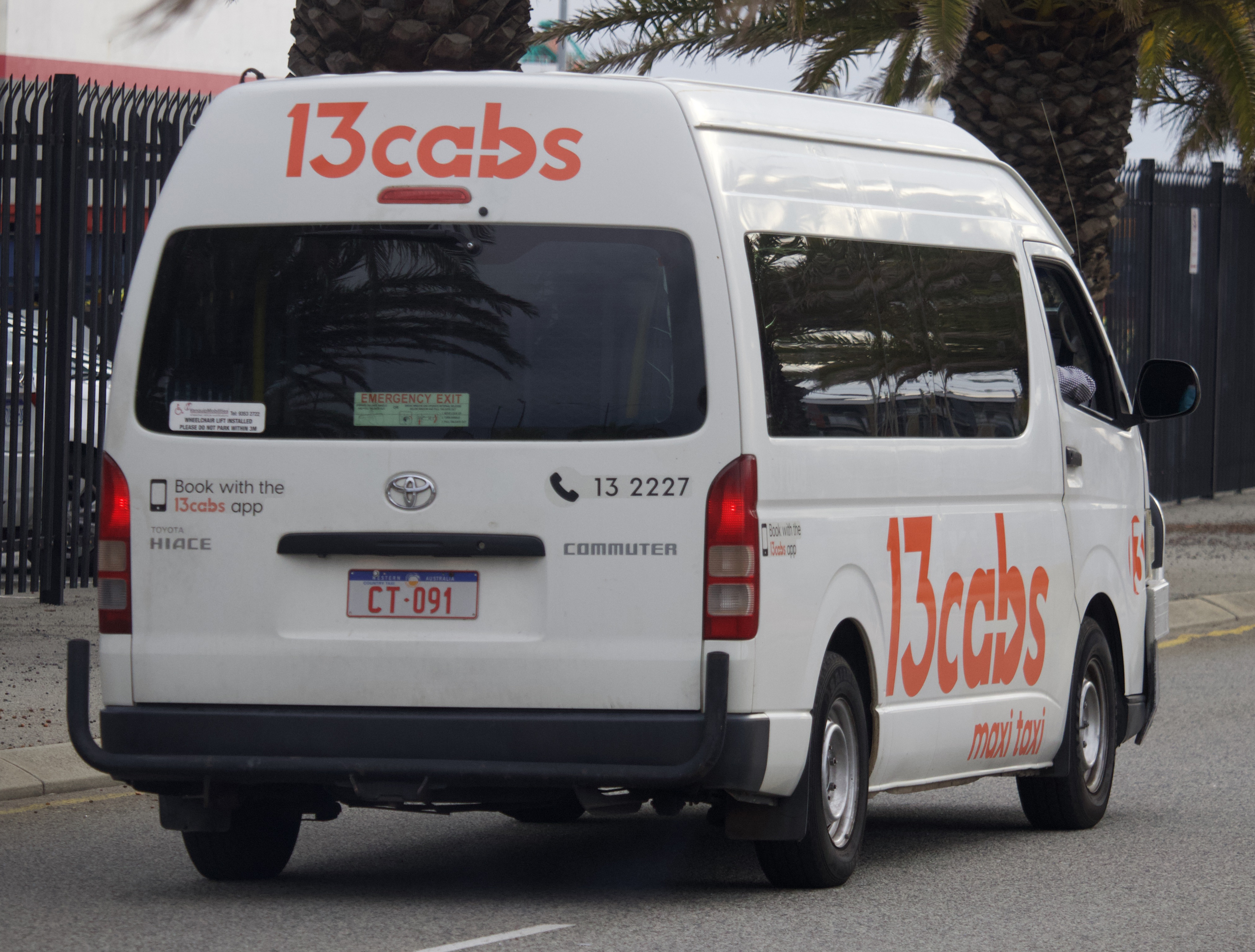
13cabs Toyota HiAce with country taxi registration plate

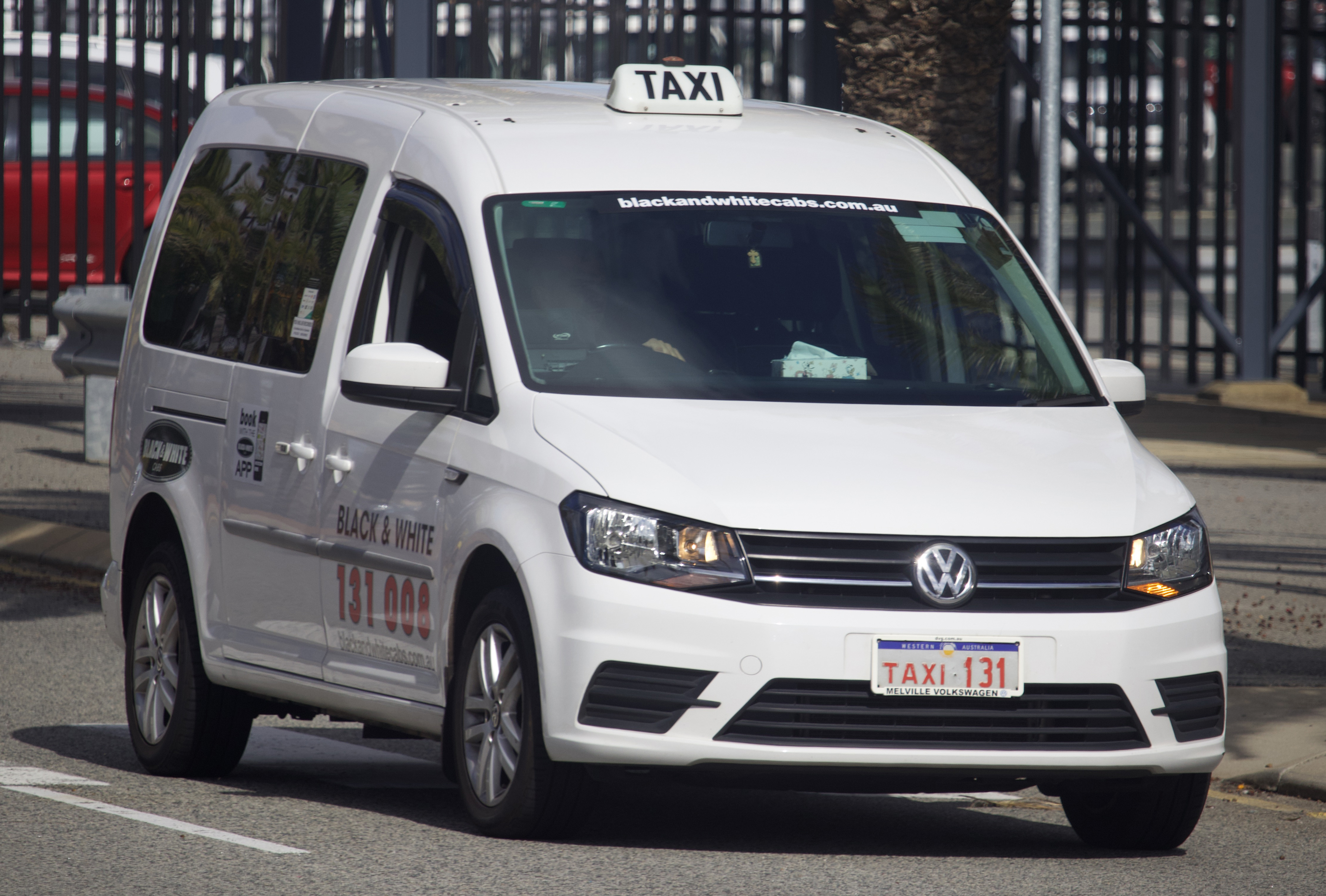
Volkswagen Caddy Black and White taxis

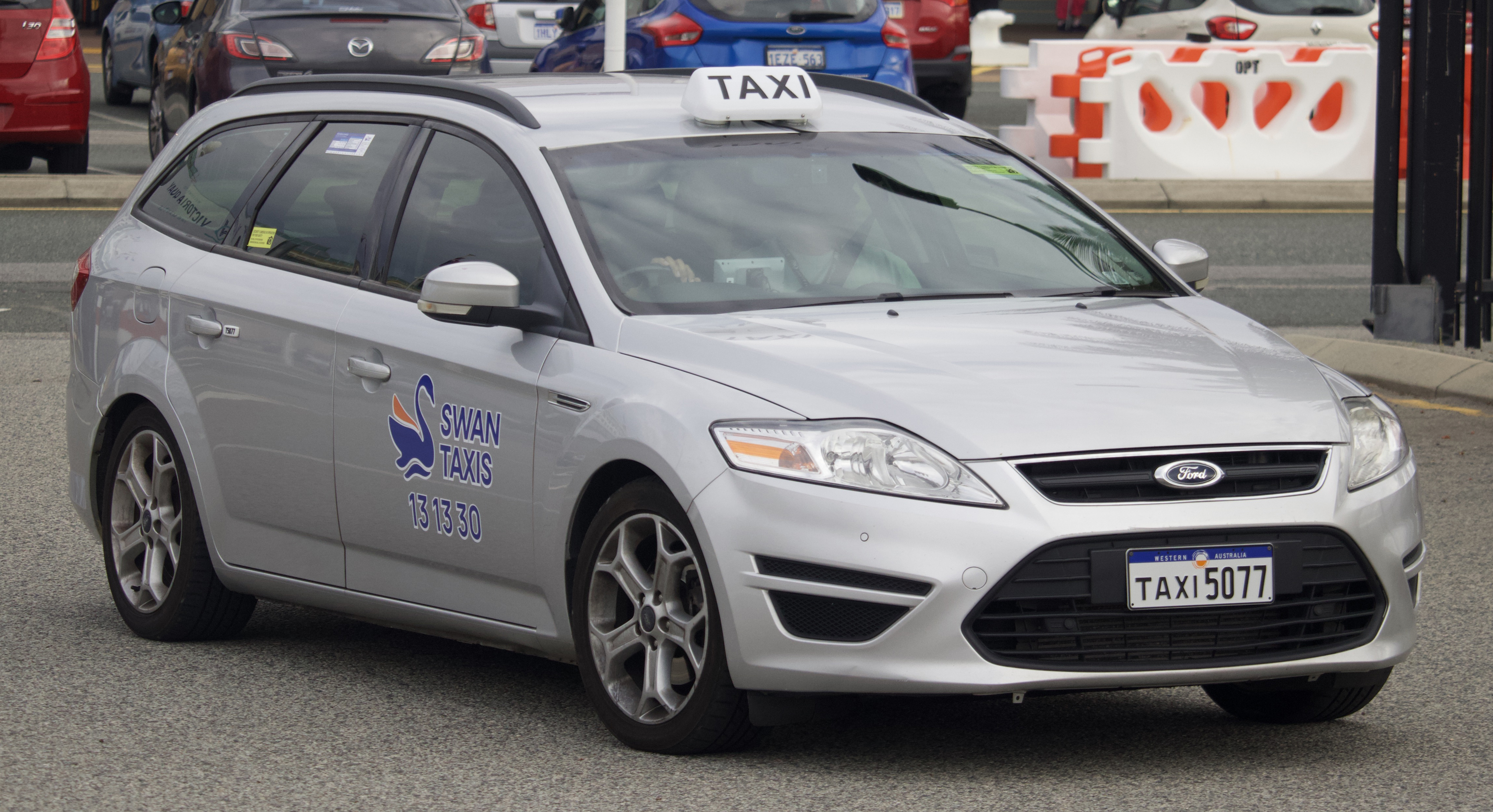
Ford Mondeo operated by Swan Taxis.

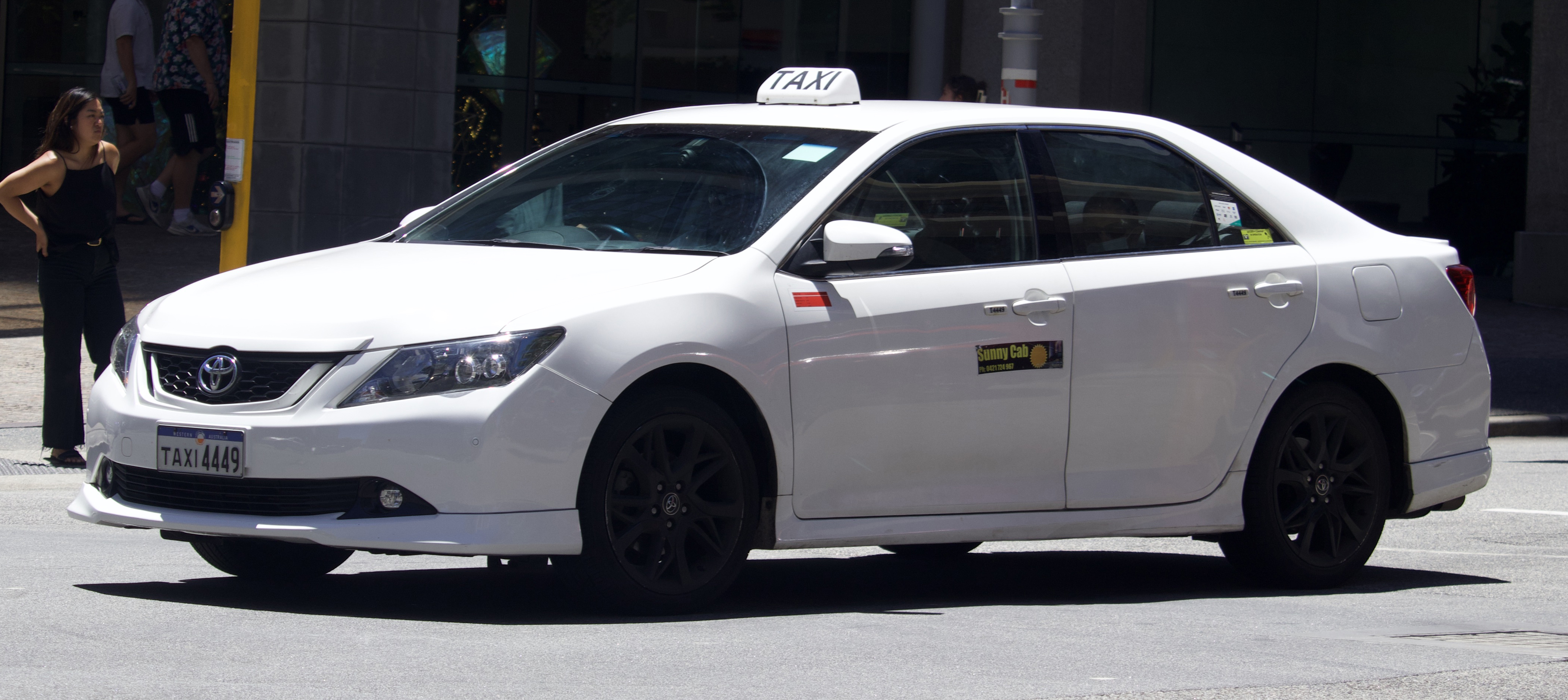
Sunny Cabs (privately operated) Toyota Aurion.

There are two main taxi dispatch service operators in the greater Perth area of Western Australia: Australian owned (parent company ASX listed) Black and White Taxis (with about 10% of traffic), providing Black & White Cabs, Sunseeker Taxis, Maxi Cabs, 13eCab and 13LCab; and Singaporean owned (through a subsidiary of ComfortDelGro) Swan Taxis (with almost 90% of traffic) which dispatches Swan Taxis, 13Cabs, Easy Access Perth, Coastal Cabs, Perth Taxi Services, Silver Service, Tricolor and Yellow Cab taxis. Other much smaller independent dispatch companies include West Coast Cabs, Rainbow Taxis, Carlisle Cabs, Cabwest and White Eagles.

In Perth, there were 2,215 taxis operating in 2013, most being either conventional sedans or station wagons. This number included 116 multipurpose taxis that can also cater for passengers who use wheelchairs, 41 peak period restricted taxis and 75 restricted area taxis. An additional fifty London-style taxis were introduced in late 2013, dispatched by Black and White Cabs.

Outside the Perth metropolitan area, taxi fleets vary considerably in size from the largest, Kalgoorlie/Boulder with 44 licensed taxis (2013), to numerous very small towns with only one licence. The largest rural taxi fleets for 2014 were Kalgoorlie/Boulder (44), Mandurah (36), Bunbury (30), Broome (29), Geraldton (25), Port Hedland (23) and Carnarvon (23).

All taxis in Western Australia have meters operated by the distance and time. The meter is connected to a rooftop light that illuminates when the cab is vacant. Cabs can be booked either by phone call or on the internet. Hailing of taxis on the street is permitted in Western Australia. There are also taxi ranks at airports, many railway stations, popular nightspots and shopping centres.

=== Australian Capital Territory ===
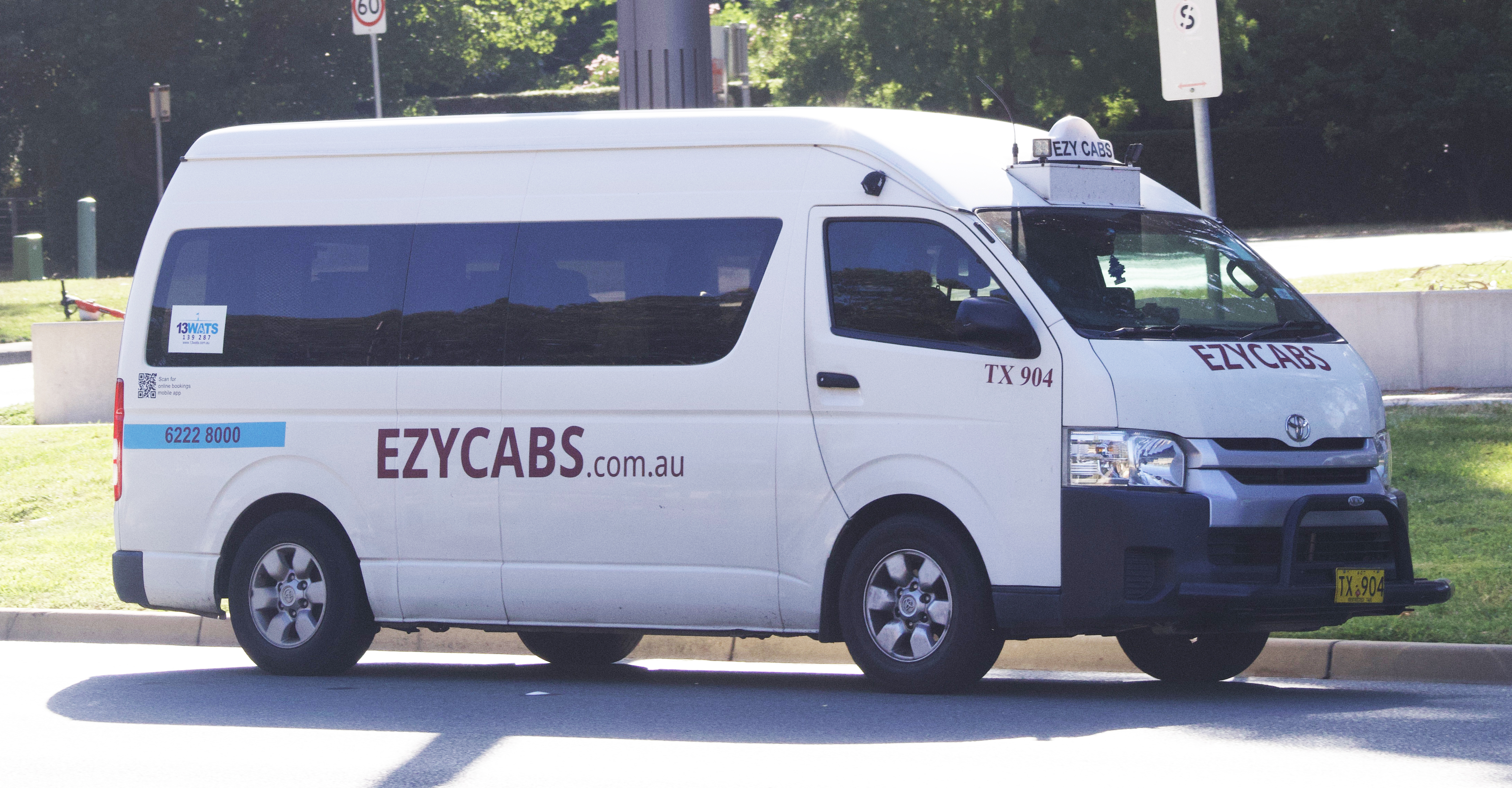
EzyCabs Toyota HiAce

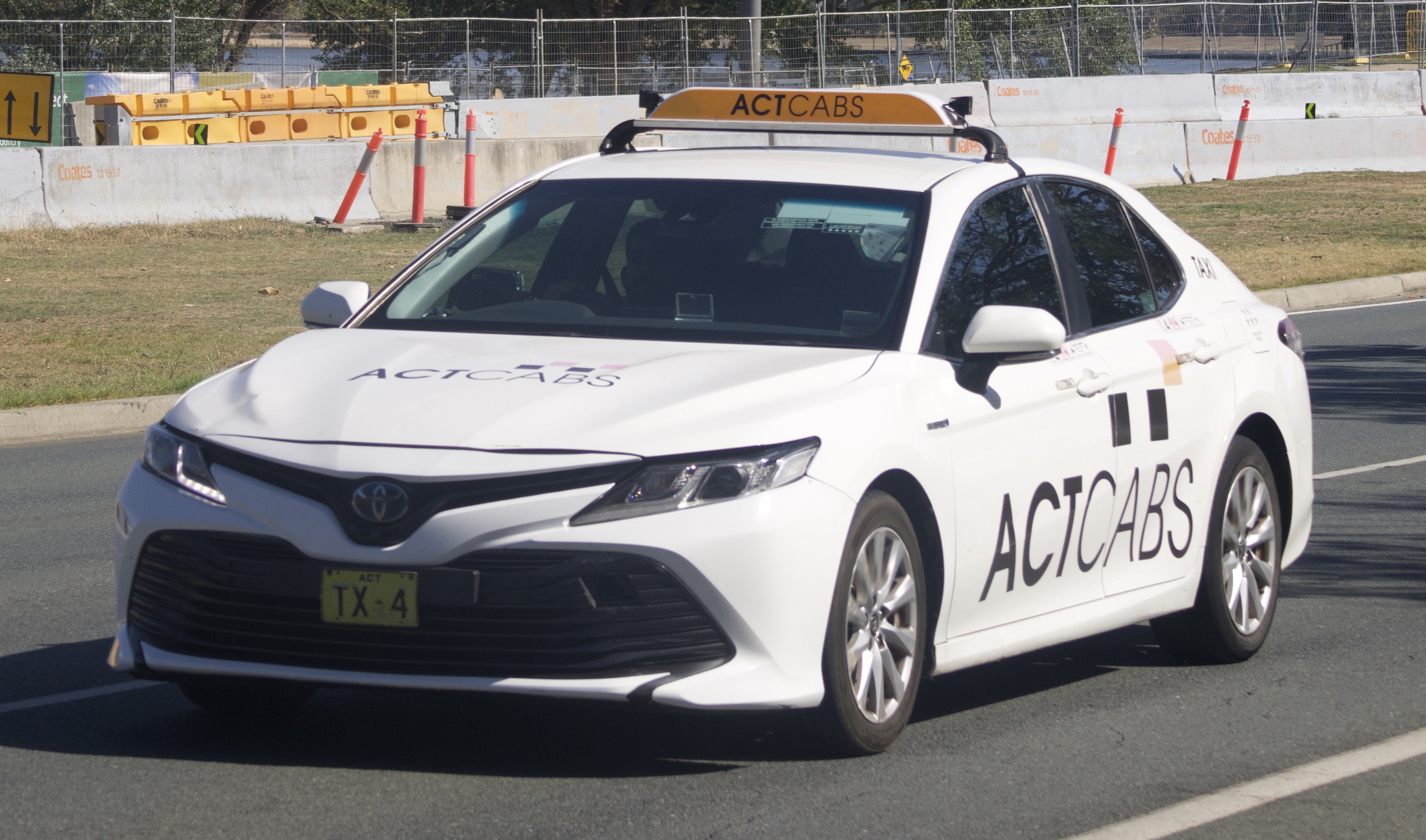
ACT Cabs Toyota Camry Ascent Hybrid

Taxis in the Australian Capital Territory originated from hire cars, which began operating in Canberra from 1924. The most well-known operators of the Canberra hire car industry at this time were Horrie and Alice Cleaver.

In 1956, one hire car was successfully fitted with a two way radio, leading to a new era of radio hire cars. Twenty-seven of these radio hire cars worked from the owners' homes as well as from ranks in the city, and picked up hails; these were then called public hire cars or taxis. Fares were calculated by the operators and were based on a return trip. Within the next year, Deluxe Taxis and Black and White Taxis were introduced and started servicing the public.

Aerial Taxis was founded in 1957 by Ken Lambert, Bruce Lamber, Jack McCarthy, Bill Dennis, Clem Sykes, Alec Vince and Rex Brodie. The founders created a telephone booth sized dispatch center and set up an antenna for their two way radios at the Ampol Service Station in Kootara Cres, Narrabundah. The name Aerial Taxis came about, as each vehicle in operation needed a one metre long antenna fixed onto the roof. By 1963, Aerial Taxis was thriving and merged with the only other taxi group in the state Deluxe Taxis. Aerial Taxis is known today as Canberra Elite (Canberra Cabs).

Canberra Cabs is now one of Canberra's largest taxi booking service providers, alongside taxi service ACT Cabs.

=== Northern Territory ===
To own and operate a taxi in Northern Territory, one has to be approved as an accredited operator, attain a Commercial Vehicle Licence (CVL) and register their taxi. There is a limit on how many taxi licences can operate in Darwin and Alice Springs, and licences are issued by ballots. A ballot is held every time taxi licences become available, with people receiving 3 weeks notice on when it will occur.

Fares in Northern Territory are regulated by the Government of the Northern Territory. Taxi meters must be certified each year and checked they are showing the correct set fares. Taxi vehicles are also required to have a roof sign, including two tariff indicator lights indicating the rate being charged on the meter, and the word 'TAXI' on the front, which is to illuminate when the taxi is currently operating and not already servicing a passenger.

=== South Australia ===
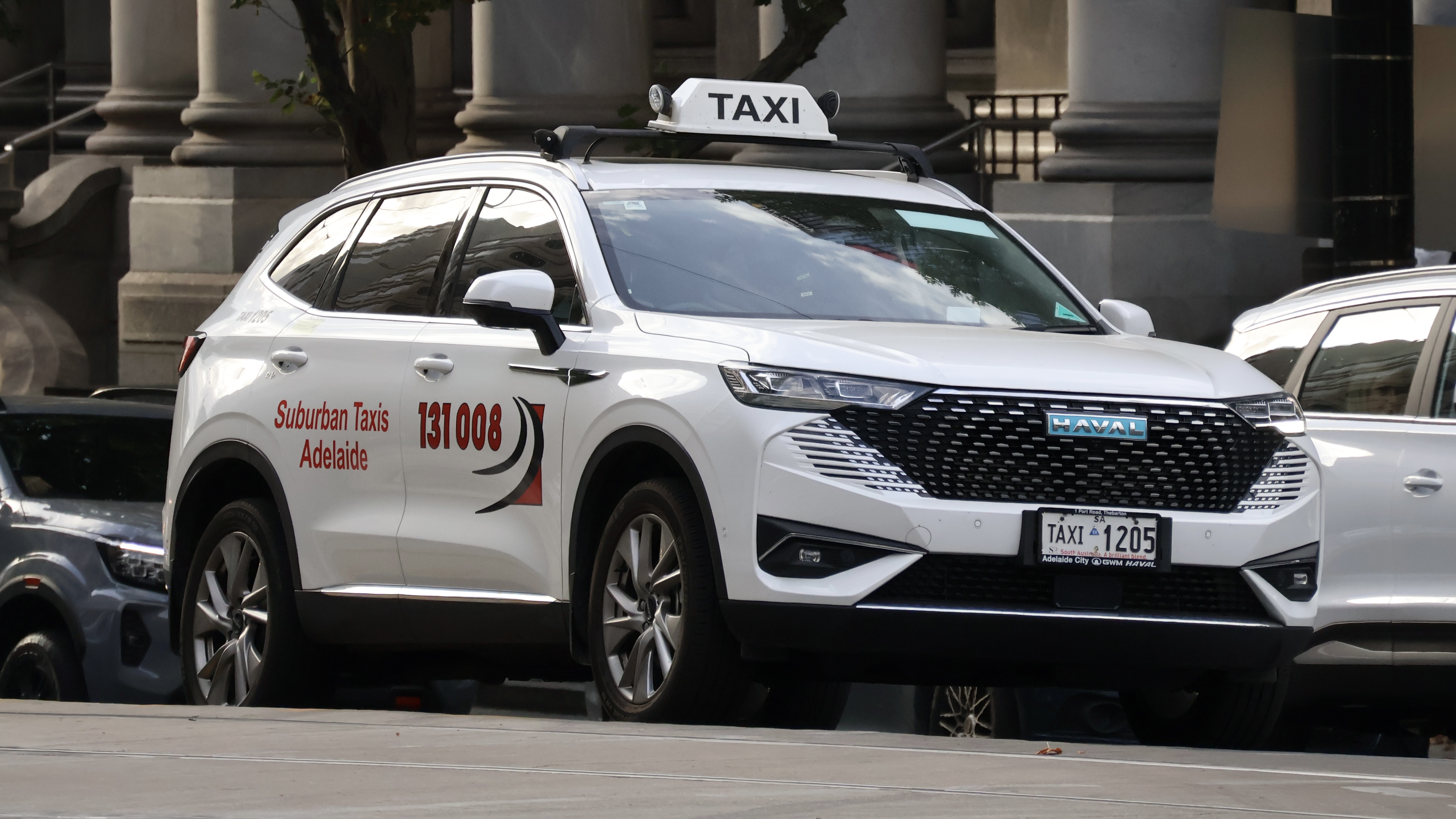
Adelaide Suburban Taxis

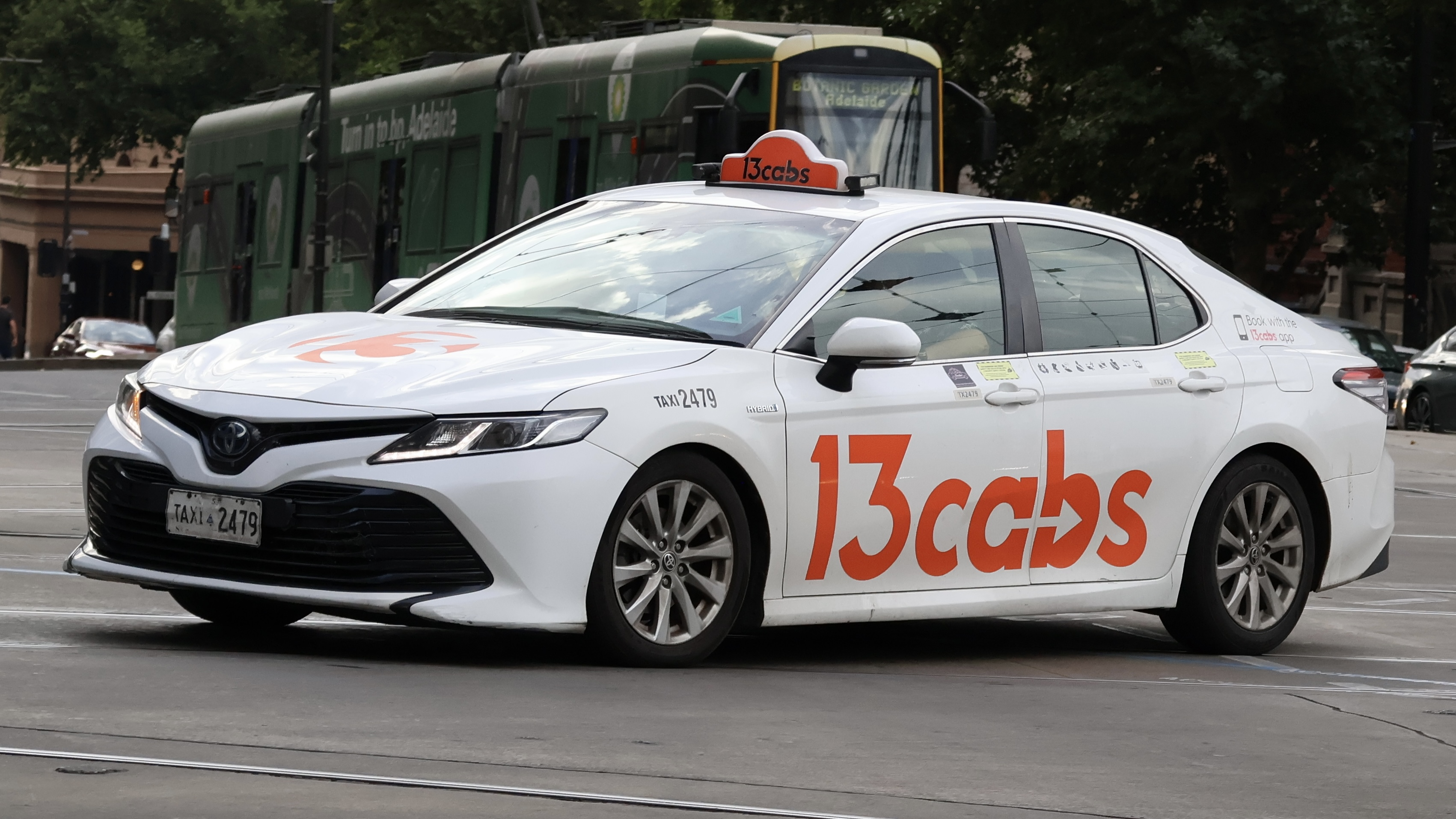
13CABS

As at 1 September 2020, there are 994 metro taxis, 253 country taxis and 102 metro wheelchair accessible vehicles registered in South Australia. In addition, as at 1 September 2020, there are 780 accredited taxi only drivers in South Australia.

Under the current legislation and the standards outlined by Department for Infrastructure and Transport (DIT), vehicles used as taxis must meet road safety and basic amenity requirements. Taxis are to display the details of the booking service provider or operator and a vehicle inspection sticker on the left hand corner of the windscreen.

On 1 October 2016, maximum fares for Adelaide metro taxis increased, for the first time within a period of 3 years, by 3%. In Adelaide, fares are calculated by the flagfall, distance travelled and waiting time. Tariffs set these rates depending on the time and day and the number of passengers in the taxi.

=== Cabcharge ===
The Cabcharge account payment system was established in 1976 to provide a way to pay for taxi fares throughout Australia and participating countries. Cabcharge has been the subject of Federal Court proceedings over alleged anti-competitive practices including predatory pricing activities and was subjected to a record high $15 million settlement for these behaviours. The company is also facing criticism of profiteering for the 10% surcharge it imposes on taxi fares paid by card and the matter is currently being investigated by the Reserve Bank of Australia, and the surcharge has been limited to no more than 5% in Victoria, New South Wales and Western Australia.

== See also ==
- Taxicabs by country
- Legality of ridesharing companies by jurisdiction#Australia
