= Tinybeans =

Family photo sharing app

- Developer: Tinybeans
- Operating system: Android, iOS
- Available in: English
- Website: tinybeans.com

Tinybeans is a family photo sharing app that helps parents capture and organize their children’s life stories using photos, video, and written messages. The primary advantage for parents is not having to give away ownership of the images and videos they post. The site also includes additional privacy features not typical of larger social media sites. Founded in Sydney, Australia in 2012, Tinybeans has a large user base in over 200 countries, with a majority of users residing in the United States.

== History ==
Stephen O'Young built the first version of the website to track his three children's milestones and an app to share their photos with his family. In March 2012, O'Young founded Tinybeans with Sarah-Jane Kurtini to make the site and app publicly available. Tinybeans competes directly with other social media companies by letting users own the rights to the images and videos they upload. Additionally, user privacy is maintained by not including a search function to find users. A parent must directly invite the users they share content with, making it harder for strangers to obtain family photos. Parents are encouraged to overshare on the app in ways that may get them labeled with pejoratives like "Instamum", "sharenting", or "baby spam" on other social media platforms.

In April 2017, Tinybeans was listed on the Australian Securities Exchange as TNY. The listing press cited a user base of 1.6 million parents and family members in 200 countries. The Tinybeans app is free to download and use. Prior to their public listing, Tinybeans raised $2 million in private capital funding Revenue comes from a paid premium version, photo printing, and site advertising. The company has direct advertising relationships with both The Walt Disney Company and Walmart. Tinybeans CEO Eddie Geller says site hosting and security is managed by Amazon Web Services. Geller said the US market has always been the goal and that 80% of new users come from the US.

In October 2017 Tinybeans appointed Bane Hunter (of GetSwift) to their advisory Board.
