= Reg Kermode =

Australian businessman (1926–2014)

Reg Kermode AM MBE
- Born: 24 September 1926
- Died: 30 April 2014 (aged 87)
- Occupations: Businessman, public transport operator
- Years active: 1965-2014
- Known for: Founding A2B Australia and Cabcharge

Reginald Lionel Kermode AM MBE (24 September 1926 – 30 April 2014) was an Australian businessman and taxicab operator most well known for founding Cabcharge in 1976.

== Early life ==
Reg Kermode was born on 24 September 1926 to Reginald and Mary Kermode (née Dillon). He grew up in Smithtown, New South Wales, and left school at the age of 15 to join the Postmaster-General Office.

== Life and career ==
Kermode decided to enter the taxi industry in 1965 and had become the chairman of Taxis Combined by 1975. During the 1980s, Kermode became known as Sydney's "Taxi kingpin" because of the role he played in the taxi industry. He was also the president of the NSW Taxi Council and the director of the NSW Taxi Industry Association. He fostered a long-standing relationship with Neville Wran, the former Premier of New South Wales, and Wran served on the group of Cabcharge for 10 years.

== Cabcharge Australia ==
Kermode founded Cabcharge Australia in 1976 and served on the company's board of directors for 39 years. During this time, Cabcharge came to be the electronic payment system used by 97% of the taxi fleets in Australia.

=== Sydney Morning Herald allegations ===
Kermode was the subject of sustained criticism by Linton Besser, a journalist for the Sydney Morning Herald. Besser, who referred to Kermode as the "Taxi tsar of Sydney", accused him of taking advantage of industry and political connections.

== Honours and recognition ==
Kermode was appointed a Member of the Order of the British Empire in 1979 for service to the transport industry. In the 1987 Birthday Honours he was made a Member of the Order of Australia (AM) for "service to secondary industry, particularly to the transport industry".

== Death ==
On 29 April 2014, Kermode resigned from Cabcharge after revealing that he had been diagnosed with cancer. Kermode died on 30 April 2014, aged 87. His funeral was held at St Jude's Church, Randwick on 8 May 2014.
