= Refusal to deal =

Potentially unlawful anti-competitive practice

Though in general, each business may decide with whom they wish to transact, there are some situations when a refusal to deal may be considered an unlawful anti-competitive practice, if it prevents or reduces competition in a market. The unlawful behaviour may involve two or more companies refusing to use, buy from or otherwise deal with a person or business, such as a competitor, for the purpose of inflicting some economic loss on the target or otherwise force them out of the market. A refusal to deal (also known as a group boycott) is forbidden in some countries which have restricted market economies, though the actual acts or situations which may constitute such unacceptable behaviour may vary significantly between jurisdictions.

== Definitions ==
The Australian Competition & Consumer Commission defines unlawful refusal to deal as follows:

Agreements involving competitors that involve restricting the supply of goods are prohibited if they have the purpose or effect of substantially lessening competition in a market in which the businesses operate.

The Indian Competition Act, 2002 (s. 4-d) defines refusal to deal as follows:

"Refusal to deal" includes any agreement which restricts, or is likely to restrict, by any method the persons or classes of persons to whom goods are sold or from whom goods are bought

In Canada, refusal to deal is considered a restrictive trade practice and is defined in Section 75 of the Competition Act (R.S.C., 1985, c. C-34).

== See also ==
- ACCC v Cabcharge Australia Ltd
- Commercial law
- Competition law
- Essential facilities doctrine
- Exclusive dealing
- Market economy
- Market power
- Monopoly
- Monopsony
- Zero tolerance
