= 13cabs =

Australian taxi network

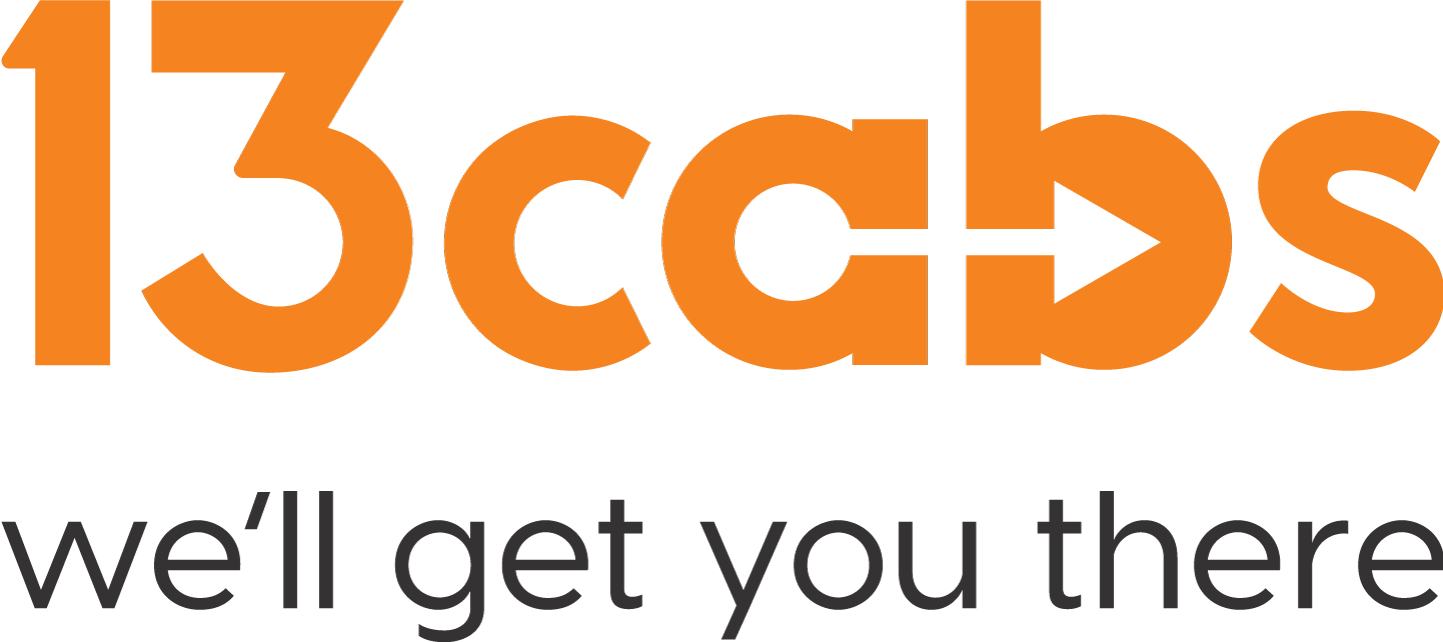
- Industry: Taxi
- Headquarters: Melbourne, Australia
- Area served: Adelaide; Brisbane; Hobart; Melbourne; Newcastle; Sydney
- Subsidiaries: 13things
- Website: www.13cabs.com.au

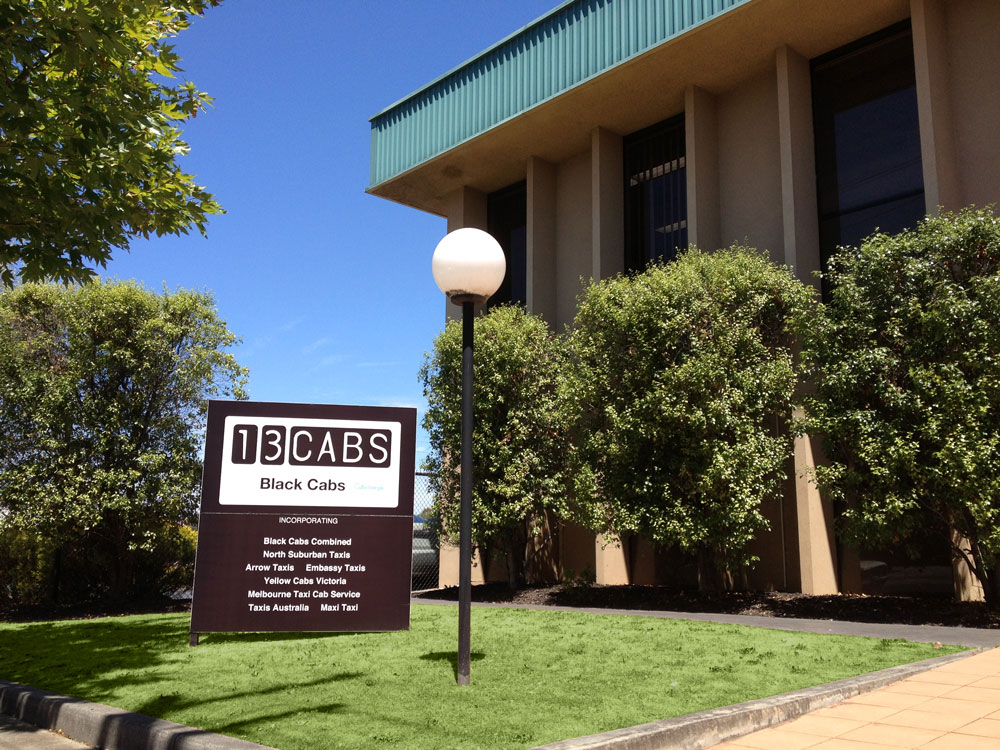
13cabs Head Office in Oakleigh, Victoria

13cabs is an Australian taxi network with a fleet of over 10,000 vehicles. Named after their phone number (13 22 27 or "13cabs"), and a part of A2B Australia, 13cabs operates in Sydney, Melbourne, Adelaide, Brisbane, Perth and Newcastle. 13cabs has expanded to the Northern Territory, regional Victoria and regional Queensland, providing a 24/7 booking service via three Australian-based contact centres.

In March 2020, in an effort to counter the impact of the COVID-19 pandemic on the taxi industry, it was announced that 13cabs had established a subsidiary named 13things, a home delivery service that offers to pick up and deliver goods and parcels.

In February 2025, 60 Minutes Australia uncovered fraud and abuse of customers, often those with physical or mental disabilities, conducted by 13cabs' drivers. The fraud typically involved exploitation of loopholes in the Cabcharge terminal and payment systems that A2B supplies to Australian state and federal agencies.

== Community ==
13cabs supports and creates community programs such as the 13cabs Taxi Driver Memorial Cup, an annual cricket match between a team of taxi drivers and a team of professional athletes. In 2019, 13cabs facilitated over eight million trips supporting passengers with a disability. Other initiatives include helping to deliver medical goods to hospitals, partnering with charitable organisations like Guide Dogs Australia, the Royal Children's Hospital and the Good Friday Appeal.

== Locations ==
13cabs operates in all states and territories of Australia

Adelaide
Brisbane
Darwin
Melbourne
Perth
Sydney
Airlie Beach
Alice Springs
Albury
Bairnsdale
Ballarat
Bathurst
Bendigo
Blue Mountains
Bundaberg
Coffs Harbour
Dubbo
Darwin
Forster
Gold Coast
Geelong
Geraldton
Ipswich
Logan
Mackay
Mandurah
Newcastle
Rockhampton
Sale
Shepparton
Surf Coast
Tamworth
Taree
Toowoomba
Townsville
Tully
Tuncurry
Warrnambool
Wellington
Wodonga
Wollongong

== Awards ==
On 25 July 2014, 13cabs was awarded the Monash Business Awards Business of the Year 2013–2014.
