= Housing Industry Association =

Australian homebuilders association

- Formation: June 1945; 80 years ago
- Type: Non-government organisation
- Location: Campbell, ACT, Australia
- National President: Ian Hazan
- Managing Director: Jocelyn Martin
- Main organ: National Board of Directors
- Website: hia.com.au
- Formerly called: Builders and Allied Trades Association

The Housing Industry Association (HIA) is the peak national member association for residential construction and home building, renovation and development. The organisation was founded in 1945 to advocate for builders and strengthen the industry.

HIA offers annual membership to builders and other residential building professionals who run small businesses in the Australian housing sector. The association is dedicated to arming members with knowledge, expert advice, resources and support to help them scale their business and build homes for all Australians.

The HIA's headquarters are located in Canberra. The association also has offices in every capital city and dozens of regions across Australia.

== Services ==
HIA provides a range of services, information and training to assist HIA members and those in the home building industry.

HIA's advocacy work speaks for their national membership across all levels of government. The organisation collaborates with an Australia-wide network of regional representatives to develop policies and recommendations that benefit and recognise the importance of the Australian housing industry. HIA contributes to enquiries and represents members at events and forums that impact on the residential building sector. Policy areas include economics, industry, building, planning, industrial relations, legal, environment, training and skills. The association conducts surveys, undertakes research and publishes expert analysis and reports including new home sales on a regular basis.

== History ==
The Housing Industry Association (HIA) was created in 1945. It was initially called the Builders and Allied Trades Association (BATA). In its first three years the group signed up 1,000 members. In June 1965 the organisation became a national association. HIA's scope and services have expanded significantly since its inception. Today, the association continues to honour their origins while embracing the broader role they play in supporting Australia’s building industry.

== See also ==
- Australian property bubble
- Silberberg v The Builders Collective of Australia Inc.
