= Hunter Valley Developments Pty Ltd v Cohen =

Australian legal case

- Court: Federal Court of Australia
- Full case name: Re Hunter Valley Developments Pty Limited; Anthony Neary Walker; Mende Brown v the Honourable Barry Cohen Minister of Home Affairs and Environment
- Argued: 20 June 1984
- Decided: 5 July 1984

Court membership
- Judge sitting: Wilcox J

Hunter Valley Developments Pty Ltd v Cohen is a 1984 decision of the Federal Court of Australia about the discretion to allow applications for review an administrative decision under section 11 of the Administrative Decisions (Judicial Review) Act 1977 that were made later that the statutory limits allowed.

In 1981 Hunter Valley Developments Pty Ltd applied for a "10BA" tax incentive for creation of a feature-length film. After some correspondence between the parties, the 10BA application was rejected in 1982. In 1984, the company applied for judicial review of the decision. By 1984, the respondent was Barry Cohen, then the Minister of the Department of Home Affairs and Environment.

In a decision that aggregated previous case law, Justice Murray Wilcox identified six issues to be considered:

- whether the applicant has demonstrated why there was a good reason for the delay in the application and that it was "‘fair and equitable in the circumstances"
- whether the applicant has continued to contest the decision, even if outside statutory review provisions
- whether there may be any adverse consequences to the decision maker caused by the delayed application
- whether there may be any adverse consequences to the decision maker or the public at large by the acceptance of the delayed application
- the merits of the applicant's case itself
- whether it would be fair to other parties in similar situations to the applicant to allow the delayed application

The principles in the case have been adopted to apply to extension of time applications in courts and tribunals including the Supreme Court of Queensland, the Commonwealth Administrative Appeals Tribunal and the Victorian Civil and Administrative Tribunal.
