= Cabcharge =

Taxi account payment system

The Cabcharge account payment system was established in 1976 to provide taxi passengers a way to pay for taxi fares by non-cash means. The payment system is owned and operated by A2B Australia (formerly Cabcharge Australia), part of ComfortDelGro. In the UK and Singapore, Cabcharge is operated by other subsidiaries of ComfortDelGro.

Cabcharge Australia's commercial activities, in which the Cabcharge payment system is an integral part, have been controversial at times and the company has faced regular accusations of excessive charging or profiteering and predatory and anti-competitive practices. The company was recently subject to adverse court proceedings and a major settlement arising from these behaviours.

== Cabcharge system ==
The Cabcharge system has several aspects:

- Cabcharge accounts – customers can create a line of credit for use to pay for taxi fares and related charges, and involves the use of a Cabcharge credit card, e-ticket or paper voucher. The value of taxi fares paid using such instruments in Australia in 2007/08 was over A$455 million. Cabcharge levies a 10% service fee on such payments.
- payment processing system – drivers can process Cabcharge instruments and other non-cash payments (e.g. credit and debit cards) manually or electronically. The manual system uses dockets and cheque-like vouchers supplied by Cabcharge, which are processed using credit card imprinters. The electronic system uses EFTPOS terminals and other equipment supplied by Cabcharge. In 2008, customers in Victoria paid at least $350 million in taxi fares using banking cards. Cabcharge's EFTPOS terminals were present in approximately 95% of Australia's taxis. Cabcharge does not charge drivers, owners or networks for supplying equipment for the payment processing system, instead charging passengers a 10% service fee. Networks are paid a commission out of the service fee.
- taximeters and meter updates – Cabcharge began supplying these from late 2004. Taximeters, which record the charge for each passenger's journey, require regular updates for taxi fare changes. Updates cannot be installed by drivers or operators. A significant point of difference of Cabcharge's meters compared to their competitors is that updates can be installed "over the air" by mobile telephony and Cabcharge's EFTPOS systems, whereas competitors' meter upgrades have to be physically installed, requiring taxis to be off the road for a period of time. The meters and updates are part of an integrated electronic payment and radio dispatch system with other taxi equipment supplied by Cabcharge.

== Controversy over surcharge ==
Cabcharge was criticised for the 10% surcharge it collected on taxi fares paid by credit and debit cards. Critics argued that the charge was excessive compared with the cost of processing card payments. Professor Allan Fels, the former head of the Australian Competition & Consumer Commission, approached the Reserve Bank of Australia in 2011 to help lower the surcharge. The Reserve Bank also reviewed taxi payment surcharges and excessive card surcharging. Victoria legislated in late June 2013 to limit the surcharge to 5% or less from February 2014. New South Wales reduced the surcharge to 5% from December 2014. Western Australia reduced the surcharge to 5% in February 2015.

== Findings of the Taxi Industry Inquiry ==
The Taxi Industry Inquiry headed by Professor Fels has made a number of major criticisms of Cabcharge and its activities in a recent report.

=== General anti-competitive conduct ===
"There are now significant anti-competitive forces at play within the industry, most notably the concentration of power with the major taxi networks and Cabcharge."

"The inquiry is concerned primarily about the effectiveness of competition in markets for payments processing and payment instruments. Over time, it appears to the inquiry that Cabcharge has been extremely effective in stifling the development of competition in these markets."

=== Predatory use of payment instruments ===
"In relation to payment instruments, if the market is defined for taxi-specific payment instruments, then Cabcharge has a very strong position in this market. It appears to have largely captured the network effects and has reinforced this by integrating into payments processing and network services."

"There is a high level of market concentration in the non-cash payment systems market with one enterprise, Cabcharge, historically holding market power in both taxi-specific payment instruments and payments processing. Cabcharge is the only significant taxi-specific payments instrument, and Cabcharge estimates that its electronic payment processing system is found in approximately 97 per cent of Australian taxis, limousines and water taxis, including all – or nearly all – taxis in Victoria."

"...markets for payment instruments and processing are characterised by strong network effects. Cabcharge has been able to take advantage of these network effects by tying its branded cards to its processing facilities; that is, only Cabcharge EFTPOS terminals are permitted to process Cabcharge cards. Cabcharge has not given other payment providers access to process Cabcharge’s own cards and vouchers. As Cabcharge cards are the most widely used payment instrument, and the only significant taxi-specific payment instrument, a taxi operator that does not have the ability to process these cards will be seriously disadvantaged. This means that alternative processors face a significant barrier to establishing a market presence. Market inquiries indicate that Cabcharge branded charge account cards and eTickets account for up to 40 per cent of non-cash transactions in the taxi industry. This was a key issue that the ACCC sought to address in ACCC v Cabcharge Australia Ltd."

=== Predatory activities through mergers and service controls ===
"Numerous vertical mergers involving Cabcharge have been cause for concern for the ACCC over the past 15 years. Cabcharge’s acquisition of network service providers (NSPs) in Australian capital cities is considered to have given Cabcharge valuable influence over the payment systems installed in its affiliated taxis and raised barriers to entry that have protected its position in the payments system market."

"Through its NSPs, Cabcharge also provides a wide range of services to the industry, including driver training, taxi vehicle 'fit-outs', taxi cameras and meters, licence brokerage and insurance for taxi operators. It is the inquiry’s view that these activities have implications for competition in the payments services markets. More specifically, they help to maintain market power in payment instruments and payments processing: that is, Cabcharge is not likely to be seeking to 'foreclose' downstream markets by providing affiliated NSPs with lower cost access to payments services, but is seeking to make it more difficult for entrants into payments processing to provide services to taxi operators. Through this strategy, elements of the market essentially become foreclosed to other processors, making it harder for them to build scale and compete with Cabcharge. This protection of the 10% surcharge is a key consideration for Cabcharge given that income from the service fee contributes around $87.3 million to its annual revenue (almost 50 per cent of the company’s total annual revenue)."

=== Observations about Cabcharge's 10% surcharge ===
"... even with the lessening of some barriers to competition – such as access to processing Cabcharge-branded cards and the removal of the MPTP-Cabcharge monopoly – the 10 per cent surcharge is likely to remain common practice. Market pressure for a reduction in the surcharge may only occur if and when taxi operators and networks effectively compete for consumers by lowering fares and the costs of associated payment methods."

"The inquiry is concerned that consumers pay excessive fees for processing electronic payments of taxi fares. The significant market power historically exercised by Cabcharge in setting its 10 per cent service fee appears to act as a 'marker' for other payment service providers. This is a particular concern in relation to general bank issued or third party payment instruments, given that average surcharges applied by merchants in other sectors are between one and four per cent."

"The lack of access to Cabcharge branded cards has also reduced competition nationwide in markets for taxi payments processing. However, the Victorian Government has little power to effect change in this area. Competition law rests in the federal domain, with the ACCC being responsible for ensuring that payments system arrangements comply with the competition and access provisions of the Commonwealth Competition and Consumer Act 2010. As discussed above, the ACCC has endeavoured to address the commercial barriers to entry in the past and continues to monitor Cabcharge’s behaviour. The inquiry supports the ACCC’s continued scrutiny of this issue."

"... the inquiry remains concerned about the 10 per cent surcharge currently imposed on Victorian taxi users. The fact that half of these fees overall are funnelled back to drivers, NSPs and operators strongly suggests that the 10 per cent is unnecessarily high and that there will be significant consumer benefit in lowering the charge to a level where these payments are minimal or eliminated."

=== Concluding criticisms about misuse of commercial power ===
"Perceptions of poor service performance, high fares and a low level of innovation are major contributors to stagnating demand for taxi services. The uneven distribution of income derived by the taxi industry also affects service quality. Licence holders benefit significantly from the scarcity of licences; others in the industry with market power, such as network service providers (NSPs) and Cabcharge, also do well. On the other hand, taxi drivers engaged by operators receive around half the wage they would be entitled to if they were treated as employees. Taxi operators who are paying fees to licence holders under assignments are also under increasing cost pressures. ... there are now significant anti-competitive forces at play within the industry, with many years of constraints on competition creating an industry mindset that is heavily focused on protecting incumbent interests, rather than seeking ways to improve services to consumers."

"NSPs generally appear to have significant market power. They have few competitors and, in many cases, have no other competitors in their allocated zones. There appear to be significant economies achieved by having larger network size, but regulation has also contributed to high market concentration. Where firms have significant market power, this may be extended into other markets by vertical integration and other vertical relationships. Of particular concern in this regard, are the links between Cabcharge and one of the major metropolitan NSPs and the extension of NSP activities to in-vehicle equipment supply."

"The inquiry’s view is that commercial barriers set up by Cabcharge are best addressed by the ACCC and the Reserve Bank of Australia, who oversee and enforce regulation of anti-competitive behaviour in payment systems markets and the efficiency of the payment systems and are best placed to ensure regulatory consistency between the states."

== Winner of one of Australia's shonkiest products ==
The Australian consumer magazine Choice confers awards annually, the Shonky Awards, to recognise Australia's poorest or "shonkiest" products. Choice states that the competition "recognises and reprimands misleading claims, false advertising, lack of transparency, faulty goods and/or poor service."

Cabcharge was awarded a Shonky Award in 2012 for its 10% surcharge on taxi fares paid by card.

== See also ==
- Taxi Industry Inquiry
