= ASIC v GetSwift Ltd =

Decision of the Federal Court of Australia

ASIC v GetSwift Ltd is a 2023 decision of the Federal Court of Australia brought by the Australian Securities & Investments Commission (ASIC) against technology company GetSwift Ltd which resulted in the largest ever penalty awarded for corporate misconduct and resulted in reforms to listing rules on the Australian Securities Exchange (ASX).

In June 2020 ASIC began proceedings in the Federal Court against GetSwift Ltd alleging GetSwift and its directors Bane Hunter, Joel Macdonald and Brett Eagle made representations in a series of ASX announcements relating to client agreements, between February 2017 and December 2017 that were misleading and that it failed to notify the ASX of material information in relation to these client agreements.

In November 2021 the Federal Court found the directors were knowingly involved in multiple continuous disclosure breaches and made multiple deceptive contraventions and breached their director duties. GetSwift appealed decision before later withdrawing its appeal.

In February 2023 the Federal Court handed down the largest ever penalty for corporate misconduct, with $18m in penalties issued to Getswift and its directors Hunter, Macdonald and Eagle and disqualifying each director from managing Australian corporations for 15, 12 and two years respectively.

The case caused the ASX to tighten its rules now requiring all public directors to "provide evidence of their good fame and character".

== Background and timeline of events leading to civil case ==
In 2013 Former AFL footballers Joel Macdonald, James Strauss and Rohan Bail launched alcohol delivery service Liquorun. In 2015 after raising seed investment, the company pivoted to providing software to delivery services and rebranded as GetSwift.

The newly rebranded GetSwift listed on the Australian Securities Exchange (ASX) in October 2016.

Six months later, the company raised $24 million in funding in June 2017 from new and existing investors, including US institutions Horney, IFM and Regal. In this capital raise Hunter was quoted in saying "Data talks, Bullshit walks" and reported annual revenues of $336,356.

On 1 December 2018, the ASX placed GetSwift into a temporary trading halt after shares spiked 83% to $3.60 following an announcement by the company about a deal with retail giant Amazon. At the same time, the company also announced a deal with Yum! Brands, the operator of KFC and Pizza Hut in Australia, which like the Amazon announcement did not include any information on how the deal would affect the company's financials. The company had announced a partnership with the Commonwealth Bank with an estimated aggregate transaction value of $9billion.

Less than a week after having its shares suspended, GetSwift issued 18,750,000 shares at $4 each raising $75 million.

=== Investigation by AFR and trading halt ===
On 19 January 2018, several weeks after the trading halt, an investigation by the Australian Financial Review claimed that the company had twice failed to notify the market that it had lost significant contracts with Australian businesses, with many of its announced partnerships failing to proceed beyond pilot stage. At the time, the company had made 18 such announcements.

On 22 January, GetSwift entered into a voluntary trading halt after its shares dropped 55 percent following the investigation. After issuing the halt, the ASX put 28 questions to the company. In its responses, GetSwift denied it had ever failed to adequately update the market. However, the ASX found the responses unsatisfactory and the company remained suspended.

== ASIC launches civil proceedings ==
In February 2019, the ASIC commenced civil proceedings against Directors Bane Hunter and Joel Macdonald and alleged that they had both made multiple misleading statements to the public and failed to discharge their duties to the public. ASIC later amended its proceedings to include non executive director and company solicitor Brett Eagle.

In June 2020, the ASIC presented its case to the Federal Court. The ASIC alleged GetSwift and its directors misled investors in 2017 in a series of announcements that sent its share price up 1900%.

== Findings ==
In November 2021, the Federal Court found in favour of ASIC in a 800 page ruling.

Justice Lee ruled Bane Hunter was “knowingly involved” in 16 of the 22 continuous disclosure breaches, 29 of the misleading and deceptive conduct contraventions, and had breached his director's duties.

Justice Lee found Joel Macdonald was “knowingly involved” in 20 of the 22 continuous disclosure breaches, 33 of the misleading and deceptive conduct contraventions, and had breached his director's duties.

Justice Lee found Brett Eagle was “knowingly involved” in three of the 22 continuous disclosure breaches and had breached his director's duties.

== Federal Court judgment ==
In February 2023, the Federal Court handed down the largest ever penalty in Australia's history against GetSwift and its directors Joel Macdonald, Bane Hunter and Brett Eagle in a 70 page ruling.

- Former executive chairman and CEO Bane Hunter was fined $2 million and disqualified from managing corporations for 15 years.
- Managing director and former CEO Joel Macdonald was fined $1 million and disqualified from managing corporations for 12 years.
- Solicitor and non-executive director Brett Eagle was fined $75,000 and disqualified from managing corporations for 2 years.

=== Judges remarks ===
In making his ruling, Justice Lee considered the lack of remorse by those involved and in particular said Mr Hunter was “unrepentant and lacks any insight into his conduct” and “should not be in charge of the affairs of a company”, adding ASIC had been unable to “explore where all the money raised from investors went”. He also found Mr Macdonald was focused on making money and had “little understanding or regard for his legal obligations as a director”.

In deciding to award the largest ever penalty, Justice Lee said “There is no evidence of contrition or remorse by the two of the company’s senior officers primarily responsible,” and “Indeed, such evidence as there is points in the opposite direction. That Mr. Macdonald feels a ‘level of peace’ is not only cold comfort to those that have suffered loss, but also reflects a troubling and defiant lack of insight into the scale and seriousness of the wrongdoing set out in excruciating detail in the [court ruling].”

In delivering the ruling, Federal Court Justice Lee said:

"GetSwift and those primarily responsible for its wrongful conduct, could be described as representing the unacceptable face of start-up capitalism,"

"Mr Hunter is a man who is presently wholly unsuited to be in a position of responsibility in a public company," Justice Lee said.

"Mr Macdonald has little understanding or regard for his legal obligations as a director, when they get in the way of pursuing a strategy to make money."

== See also ==
- ACCC v Cabcharge Australia Ltd
