= Silberberg v The Builders Collective of Australia Inc =

2007 decision of the Federal Court of Australia

- Court: Federal Court of Australia
- Full case name: Silberberg v The Builders Collective of Australia Inc & Buckley
- Decided: 2 October 2007
- Citations: [2007] FCA 1512, (2007) 164 FCR 475

Case history
- Prior action: none
- Subsequent action: none

Court membership
- Judge sitting: Gyles J

Case opinions
- The forum user had unlawfully racially discriminated against Silberberg. The failure of the forum operator to remove the discriminatory postings was not proven to be racially motivated.

Silberberg v The Builders Collective of Australia Inc, is a 2007 judgment of the Federal Court of Australia, and the first Australian case exploring the liability of Internet forum operators for racial vilification under the Racial Discrimination Act 1975.

== Background ==
The applicant, Dr. Ron Silberberg, was the managing director of the Housing Industry Association Ltd (HIA), a company representing the interests of people involved in the residential building industry. The Builders Collective of Australia Inc (the Collective) was an incorporated association of predominantly small builders and opposes the policies of the Housing Industry Association in many areas. The Builders Collective operated a website containing a discussion forum, which contained confidential information regarding the building of transmitter sites for the Digital Radio Oceane project.

In May 2005 and January 2006, a registered user of the forum posted messages which suggested that Silberberg's Jewish background was responsible for a perceived unhealthy monetary focus on the part of the HIA. Silberberg complained to the Human Rights and Equal Opportunity Commission and, when that complaint was terminated by the Commission, sued The Builders Collective and the forum user in the Federal Court.

== The judgment ==
Justice Gyles held that the forum postings conveyed the anti-Semitic imputations alleged by Silberberg, and that the forum user (the second respondent) had posted the comments because of Silberberg's Jewish background. He held that the messages were reasonably likely, in all the circumstances, to offend and insult Silberberg or other Jews, and that their posting contravened section 18C of the Racial Discrimination Act 1975 (Cth).

Justice Gyles held that the Collective had knowledge of the presence of one of the offensive postings in the forum (which they had denied), and had failed to remove it. However, there was no evidence that they had failed to remove it because of the Jewish race or ethnicity of Silberberg, as required by the Racial Discrimination Act 1975 (Cth). The case against the Collective was dismissed with Silberberg to pay some of the Collective's costs.
