= ACCC v Cabcharge Australia Ltd =

2010 case in the Federal Court of Australia

- Court: Federal Court of Australia
- Full case name: Australian Competition and Consumer Commission v Cabcharge Australia Ltd
- Decided: 17 November 2010
- Citation: [2010] FCA 1261

Case history
- Subsequent action: ACCC v Cabcharge Australia Ltd (No 2) [2010] FCA 837

Court membership
- Judge sitting: Finkelstein J

ACCC v Cabcharge Australia Ltd is a 2010 decision of the Federal Court of Australia brought by the Australian Competition & Consumer Commission (ACCC) against Cabcharge. In June 2009, the ACCC began proceedings in the Federal Court against Cabcharge alleging that it had breached section 46 of the Commonwealth Trade Practices Act (TPA) by misusing its market power and entering into an agreement to substantially lessen competition. The action alleged predatory pricing by Cabcharge and centred on Cabcharge's conduct in refusing to deal with competing suppliers to allow Cabcharge payments to be processed through EFTPOS terminals provided by rival companies and supplying taxi meters and fare updates at below actual cost or at no cost.

In September 2010, to settle the action, Cabcharge admitted a number of contraventions of TPA and the Federal Court imposed a fine of $15 million ($14 million in civil penalties and $1 million in costs), the highest ever penalty imposed for misuse of market power. The judgement was delivered by Justice Raymond Finkelstein on 17 November 2010.

== Background ==
Cabcharge provides various products and services in Australia and overseas, predominantly to taxi drivers, owners and networks (the firms that provide booking and dispatch services to drivers and owners). The services that Cabcharge provide include non-cash payment processing systems for taxi fares, payment processing systems for taxis and provision of taxi meters. The company holds a dominant market position in these services across Australia as it supplies almost 97% of Australian taxis with its electronic payment system.

The ACCC began proceedings in June 2009 in the Federal Court against Cabcharge. The ACCC action alleged that Cabcharge had breached section 46 of the Trade Practices Act (TPA) by misusing its market power and entering into an agreement to substantially lessen competition. The action alleged predatory pricing by Cabcharge and centred on Cabcharge's conduct in refusing to deal with competing suppliers to allow Cabcharge payments to be processed through EFTPOS terminals provided by rival companies and supplying taximeters and meter updates at below actual cost or at no cost.

At the relevant date, to breach Section 46 of the TPA, a corporation must have misused its substantial market power to:

- eliminate or substantially damage a competitor
- prevent the entry of a person into that market or any other market; or
- deter or prevent a person from engaging in competitive conduct in that market or any other market.

Section 46 of the TPA was amended numerous times since September 2007 to strengthen the ACCC's ability to successfully bring proceedings for alleged contraventions. For example, in September 2007, a sub-section 46(1AA) was introduced into the TPA to prohibit corporations with substantial market share from engaging in predatory pricing. Predatory pricing occurs when a company sets its prices below cost for a sustained period for one of the anti-competitive purposes referred to above. In November 2008, the TPA was amended again to make clear the circumstances when corporations had 'taken advantage' of their market power. This change sought to deal with the evidentiary difficulties the regulator encountered in establishing this element in earlier cases. Since January 2007, the courts have also been given power to impose a civil penalty for each act or omission contravening the TPA. Civil penalties can now be imposed up to the greater of $10 million, three times the value of the benefit obtained from the misconduct, or 10% of the annual Australian turnover of the company involved.

== Resolution ==
=== Cabcharge admissions ===
To settle the proceedings, Cabcharge admitted to three contraventions of the TPA. The company agreed to the issue by the court of declarations, compliance orders, civil penalties of $14 million and costs of $1 million.

=== Cabcharge settlement ===
On 24 September 2010, Justice Finkelstein approved the settlement of the action and declared that Cabcharge had breached the TPA by taking advantage of its substantial degree of power in the Australian markets for the supply of services to enable non-cash payments for taxi fares and charges by taxi passengers and non-cash instruments that could be used only for the payment of taxi fares and charges.

== Judgement ==
=== Refusal to deal ===
It was found that since 2005 Cabcharge had unreasonably refused to deal with a potential competitor (namely Travel Tab which had changed its name to Mpos in January 2007) in the payments and instruments markets by refusing to allow Travel Tab/MPos to process Cabcharge instruments (e.g., Cabcharge cards) on Mpos EFTPOS equipment. It was found that: "With respect to both refusals, Cabcharge acknowledges that although there would have been time and costs involved in developing appropriate interfaces, there was no technical reason that would prevent any electronic taxi-specific payment product from being processed by any EFTPOS terminal as long as that taxi-specific instrument and the relevant EFTPOS terminals complied with all relevant banking/financial industry protocols, including security protocols."

It was found that: "Cabcharge’s refusals were for the purpose of preventing Travel Tab/MPos from processing Cabcharge instruments electronically and resulted in Cabcharge’s payment processing system remaining the only system that processed Cabcharge’s instruments electronically."

=== Predatory pricing ===
Between September 2004 and October 2007 Cabcharge acquired taximeters at a cost of $250 per meter. Of these, Cabcharge supplied approximately 727 units free of charge and approximately 5613 units at an invoiced price of $100 (of which it did not obtain any payment for approximately 758 units). At the time its competitors sold meters for between $430–550 plus GST. Cabcharge installed 197 meters free of charge at an estimated cost of $120 to $160 per installation. From 9 November 2007, it sold meters at a retail price of $250.

In addition, Cabcharge supplied meter updates free to networks and operators, notwithstanding that it incurred costs of around $75,000 to supply these updates. At the time its competitors charged $70 to $110 plus GST per update. Cabcharge funded its losses from profits it made from its payment processing systems.

It was found that Cabcharge took advantage of the substantial degree of power it had in the payment processing market for the purposes of: (1) affecting the profitability of other suppliers of meters and updates; (2) ensuring that other suppliers of meters and updates could not match or be price competitive with Cabcharge; and (3) ensuring that alternative suppliers did not commence supplying electronic processing services.
