= A2B Australia =

Australian public company

A2B Australia Limited
- Type: Subsidiary
- Traded as: ASX: A2B
- Industry: Land transport
- Founded: 1976; 50 years ago
- Founder: Reg Kermode
- Headquarters: Sydney, Australia
- Area served: Australia; Europe; United Kingdom
- Key people: Mark Bayliss; (Executive Chairman)
- Revenue: $147 million (2023)
- Net income: $27 million (2023)
- Parent: ComfortDelGro Australia
- Subsidiaries: 13cabs
- Website: www.a2baustralia.com

A2B Australia (formerly Cabcharge Australia) is an Australian based taxi operator.

== Overview ==
Founded in 1976 by Reg Kermode, Cabcharge was listed on the Australian Securities Exchange in 1999. Its subsidiaries operate booking and dispatch services for taxis in Australia under the Taxi Networks and 13cabs brands.

Its activities have sometimes been controversial and it has faced strong criticism at times from inquiries and regulatory bodies, especially over its Cabcharge taxi payment system. The company was the subject of Federal Court proceedings in 2010 over alleged anti-competitive practices including predatory pricing activities.

It was heavily fined and paid a record high $15 million settlement for these behaviours. The company is also facing accusations of profiteering for the 10% surcharge it imposes on taxi fares paid by a payment card and the matter was investigated by the Reserve Bank of Australia.

The surcharge has been reduced by law to 5% in Victoria following recommendations made by the Taxi Industry Inquiry and a further review of the surcharge in that State may lead to the figure being set at well below 5%. In December 2014 the surcharge was also reduced to 5% in New South Wales. As at November 2018, it operated 9.963 taxis.

== History ==
Former Cabcharge logo

The Cabcharge taxi payment system was established in 1976 to provide an alternative payment system to cash in the taxi industry.

In January 2002, Cabcharge acquired Combined Communications Network to provide taxi booking and dispatch services in Sydney. Today, it provides taxi booking and dispatch services through Taxi Networks in New South Wales (Combined Communications Network) and 13cabs in Victoria. Today, over 7,000 taxis operate on Cabcharge booking and dispatch networks in Sydney, Melbourne, Adelaide and Newcastle.

In March 2003 it acquired Black Cabs, Melbourne's second largest taxi company, to be followed by Newcastle Taxis and Melbourne's Arrow Taxis.

In 2001, Cabcharge formed a joint venture with Singapore-based DelGro Corporation (now ComfortDelGro) to form CityFleet Networks in the United Kingdom, in which Cabcharge held a 49% interest. In 2005, Cabcharge formed another joint venture company with ComfortDelGro to form ComfortDelGro Cabcharge (CDC) in Australia, in which Cabcharge held a 49% interest. CDC purchased Hillsbus and Westbus and later Blue Ribbon. In 2009, CDC purchased the Kefford Corporation in Victoria, and expanded by acquiring other bus operations. In February 2017, Cabcharge sold its shareholding to ComfortDelGro.

In October 2018, it was announced the business would be rebranded as A2B Australia. The motion to change the name change was passed by the shareholders at the company's annual general meeting in November 2018.

In December 2023, A2B entered into a scheme of arrangement for ComfortDelGro Australia to purchase the business, subject to shareholder and regulatory approval. On April 11, 2024, ComfortDelGro Australia announced that it had completed the purchase of A2B Australia.

== Outline ==
A2B Australia's principal activities include:

- provision of charge account facilities for businesses and individuals to enable non-cash payment of taxi fares.
- development of a point-of-sale system that allows taxi users to pay their fare using third party charge, credit and debit cards and Cabcharge products. The system requires passengers to pay a 10% surcharge on their fare although the surcharge is currently being reviewed by the Reserve Bank of Australia following public comments and complaints that the surcharge is excessive. The surcharge has been limited in New South Wales and Victoria to 5%.
- software development.
- provision of taxi booking and dispatch services. Additional capture of taxi owners, operators and drivers is practised through provision of services including repairs and installation of in-vehicle equipment, insurance, vehicle leasing and training.
- development of taxi-related hardware and software like taxi security camera systems, meters, and transaction processing equipment.

== Federal Court action by ACCC ==
In June 2009, the Australian Competition & Consumer Commission (ACCC) began proceedings in the Federal Court of Australia against Cabcharge alleging that Cabcharge had breached the Trade Practices Act (TPA) by misusing its market power and entering into an agreement to substantially lessen competition. The action centered on Cabcharge's conduct in refusing to deal with competing suppliers to allow Cabcharge payments to be processed through EFTPOS terminals provided by rival companies and supplying taxi meters and fare updates at below actual cost or at no cost.

On 24 September 2010, Cabcharge admitted to three contraventions of the TPA to settle the proceedings. The Federal Court approved the settlement, and declared that Cabcharge had breached the TPA by taking advantage of its substantial degree of power in the Australian markets for the supply of services to enable non-cash payments for taxi fares and charges by taxi passengers and non-cash instruments that could be used only for the payment of taxi fares and charges. The Court imposed the highest ever penalty for misuse of market power, imposing a fine of $15 million ($14 million in civil penalties and $1 million in costs).

== Sydney Morning Herald allegations ==
Cabcharge's former CEO Reg Kermode was the subject of a sustained campaign of criticism by Sydney Morning Herald journalist Linton Besser. Besser calls Kermode, "The Taxi Tsar". Besser claims that Cabcharge and Reg Kermode "...along with the industry's other big players, continues to benefit from millions of dollars worth of free taxi plates issued to it by successive governments..." as a result of political and bureaucratic connections and favouritism stretching over a generation.
