= Gramin Bhandaran Yojana =

Gramin Bhandaran Yojana, or Rural Godown Scheme, is an Indian government initiative to offer subsidies to individuals or organizations which build or repair rural godowns.

== Introduction ==
The network of rural storage will increase the holding capacity for small farmers, to sell their produce at a reasonable price, not by selling them in thunderstorms. Accordingly, the Rural Storage Scheme was started in 2001-02 under the Capital Investment Subsidy Scheme for the construction / renovation of rural warehouses.

== Rural storage scheme capacity ==
Capacity under this scheme will be decided by the entrepreneur. But to get the subsidy, the capacity of the warehouse should be minimum 100 tonnes and maximum of 30,000 tonnes. If the capacity is more than 30,000 tonnes or less than 100 tonnes then subsidy will not be given under this scheme. Subsidies will also be provided in some special cases up to 50 tonnes capacity. Subsidy will also be provided to rural warehouses with a capacity of 25 tonnes in hilly areas. The loan repayment period under this scheme is 11 years.

=== Other agriculture schemes launched by Modi regime ===
Agriculture initiatives schemes launched by the Narendra Modi regime are:

- 2020 Indian agriculture acts
- Atal Bhujal Yojana
- E-NAM for online agrimarketing
- Gramin Bhandaran Yojana, for local storage
- Micro Irrigation Fund (MIF)
- National Mission For Sustainable Agriculture (NMSA)
- National Scheme on Fisheries Training and Extension
- National Scheme on Welfare of Fishermen
- Pradhan Mantri Kisan Samman Nidhi (PMKSN) for minimum support scheme
- Pradhan Mantri Krishi Sinchai Yojana (PMKSY) for irrigation
- Paramparagat Krishi Vikas Yojana (PKVY) for organic farming
- Pradhan Mantri Fasal Bima Yojana (PMFBY) for crop insurance

== See also ==
- Agriculture in India
- Agricultural insurance in India
- Irrigation in India
- Rashtriya Krishi Vikas Yojana
