= Pradhan Mantri Fasal Bima Yojana =

Indian agricultural insurance scheme

- Country: India
- Prime Minister(s): Narendra Modi
- Ministry: Ministry of Agriculture and Farmers Welfare
- Launched: 18 February 2016; 10 years ago
- Status: Active
- Website: pmfby.gov.in

The Pradhan Mantri fasal bima yojana (PMFBY) launched on 18 February 2016 by Prime Minister Narendra Modi is an insurance service for farmers for their yields. It was formulated in line with One Nation–One Scheme theme by replacing earlier two schemes Agricultural insurance in India#National Agriculture Insurance Scheme and Modified National Agricultural Insurance Scheme by incorporating their best features and removing their inherent drawbacks (shortcomings). It aims to reduce the premium burden on farmers and ensure early settlement of crop assurance claim for the full insured sum.

Pradhan Mantri Fasal Bima Yojna (PMFBY) aims to provide a comprehensive insurance cover against failure of the crop thus helping in stabilising the income of the farmers. The scheme covers all Food & Oilseeds crops and Annual Commercial/Horticultural Crops for which past yield data is available and for which requisite number of crop cutting experiments are being conducted under General Crop Estimation Survey. The scheme is implemented by empanelled general insurance companies. Selection of Implementing Agency is done by the concerned State Government through bidding. The scheme was earlier compulsory for loanee farmers availing crop loan /KCC account for notified crops and voluntary for others, but has been made voluntary since 2020 when reforms in the scheme were introduced. The scheme is being administered by Ministry of Agriculture and Farmers Welfare.

== Objective ==
Pradhan Mantri Fasal Bima Yojana aims at supporting sustainable production in agriculture

sector by way of

- Providing financial support to farmers suffering crop loss/damage arising out of unforeseen events
- Stabilizing the income of farmers to ensure their continuance in farming
- Encouraging farmers to adopt innovative and modern agricultural practices
- Ensuring flow of credit to the agriculture sector which will contribute to food security, crop diversification and enhancing growth and competitiveness of agriculture sector besides protecting farmers from production risks.

== Implementing agency ==
The scheme shall be implemented through a multi-agency framework by selected insurance companies under the overall guidance and control of the Department of Agriculture, Cooperation & Farmers Welfare, Ministry of Agriculture & Farmers Welfare, Government of India and the concerned State in co-ordination with various other agencies; financial institutions like commercial banks, co-operative Banks, regional rural banks and their regulatory bodies, government departments

== Coverage of farmers ==
All the farmers growing notified crops in a notified area during the season who have insurable in the crop are eligible.

Voluntary coverage: From 2020 Kharif onwards the enrollment is made 100% voluntary.

== Coverage of crops ==
1. Oil seeds
2. Food crop
3. Annual Commercial / Annual Horticultural crops.

In addition for perennial crops, pilots for coverage can be taken for those perennial horticultural crops for which standard methodology for yield estimation is available.

== Coverage of risks and exclusions.... ==
Following stages of the crop risks leading to crop loss are covered under the Scheme.

1. Prevented Sowing/Planting/Germination Risk: Insured area is prevented from sowing/planting/germination due to deficit rainfall or adverse seasonal/weather conditions.
2. Standing Crop (Sowing to Harvesting): Comprehensive risk insurance is provided to cover yield losses due to non-preventable risks, viz. drought, dry spell, flood, inundation, widespread pests and disease attack, landslides, fire due to natural causes, lightning, storm, hailstorm and cyclone.
3. Post-Harvest Losses: Coverage is available only up to a maximum period of two weeks from harvesting, for those crops which are required to be dried in cut and spread / small bundled condition in the field after harvesting against specific perils of hailstorm, cyclone, cyclonic rains and unseasonal rains
4. Localized Calamities: Loss/damage to notified insured crops resulting from occurrence of identified localized risks of hailstorm, landslide, inundation, cloud burst and natural fire due to lightning affecting isolated farms in the notified area.
5. Add-on coverage for crop loss due to attack by wild animals: States may consider providing add-on coverage for crop loss due to attack by wild animals wherever the risk is perceived to be substantial and is identifiable.

General exclusions: Losses arising out of war and nuclear risks, malicious damage and other preventable risks shall be excluded.

== List of insurance companies ==
Department of Agriculture Cooperation & Farmers Welfare has designated/empanelled Agriculture Insurance Company of India(AIC) and some private insurance companies presently to participate in the Government sponsored agriculture /crop insurance schemes based on their financial strength, infrastructure, manpower and expertise etc. The empaneled insurance companies at present are:

- Agriculture Insurance Company of India
- ICICI Lombard
- HDFC ERGO General Insurance Company
- IFFCO-Tokio General Insurance
- Cholamandalam MS General Insurance
- Bajaj Allianz General Insurance
- Reliance General Insurance
- Future Generali India Insurance
- TATA AIG General Insurance
- SBI General Insurance
- Universal Sompo General Insurance

== Unit of insurance ==
The scheme shall be implemented on an ‘Area Approach basis’ i.e., Defined Areas for each notified crop for widespread calamities with the assumption that all the insured farmers, in a Unit of Insurance, to be defined as "Notified Area‟ for a crop, face similar risk exposures, incur to a large extent, identical cost of production per hectare, earn comparable farm income per hectare, and experience similar extent of crop loss due to the operation of an insured peril, in the notified area.

Defined Area (i.e., unit area of insurance) is village/village panchayat level by whatsoever name these areas may be called for major crops and for other crops it may be a unit of size above the level of Village/Village Panchayat. In due course of time, the Unit of Insurance can be a Geo-Fenced/Geo-mapped region having homogeneous Risk Profile for the notified crop.

For risks of localised calamities and Post-Harvest losses on account of defined peril, the Unit of Insurance for loss assessment shall be the affected insured field of the individual farmer.

== Calendar of activity ==
Activity	Kharif	Rabi
Loaning period (loan sanctioned) for Loanee farmers covered on Compulsory basis.	April to July	October to December
Cut-off date for receipt of Proposals of farmers (loanee & non-loanee).	31 July	31 December
Cut-off date for receipt of yield data	Within a month from final harvest	Within a month from final harvest

== Problems ==
A rapid increase in enrollment was to be the hallmark of the PMFBY. The target was to cover 50% of the cropped area, about 9 crore 8 lakh hectares, by 2018-19.

In 2017-2018, the second year of the PMFBY, the enrollment numbers fell sharply, taking the coverage to below 2015 levels. Against the target of 50% for 2018-19, the coverage stands at less than 26% in 2017-18. The scheme is supposed to provide insurance protection to farmers against crop losses due to natural events – has turned into a bonanza for insurance companies while farmers are angry over delays in claim settlement, rejections and paltry compensation. Launched in 2016, four full seasons have passed since and the financial transactions show earnings of insurance companies reaching almost Rs.16,000 crore from the first three seasons, kharif 2016, rabi 2016-17 and kharif 2017. Although the rabi 2017-18 season is over yet over two months later, claim settlement is still not complete.

In other words, the scheme is essentially transferring farmers’ money and government funds to the insurance companies ’coffers while pretending to provide much needed compensation to farmers whose crops are lost in inclement weather conditions. RTI data received and reviewed by The Wire has revealed that farmers’ claims worth Rs 2,829 crore remain unpaid for the two seasons that the PMFBY has been implemented.

The RTI response of the ministry of agriculture and farmers’ welfare is dated October 10.

"A majority of claims for rabi 2017-18 are yet to be estimated/approved by company," the ministry noted in its response. Thus, for the 2017–18 season, a majority of the data pertains to Kharif 2017 and the data reflects only 1% of the claims paid for the rabi 2017–18 season.

For the 2016–17 season, claims of Rs 546 crore remain pending. Claims need to be settled within two months of harvest, according to the PMFBY guidelines. Harvest for the 2016–17 season would have ended in May 2017, at the very latest.

For the 2017–18 season, claims worth Rs 2,282 crore remain pending. The data essentially pertains to Kharif 2017–18, as pointed out by the ministry. The harvest for which would have ended in December 2017, at the very latest.

In 2020, several states exited the scheme, declining to implement it. The State of Gujarat exited the PMFBY scheme in August 2020, citing drains on the state's finances because of the high premiums charged under the scheme. The State of Punjab had declined to implement the scheme at all, and the states of Andhra Pradesh, Telangana and Jharkhand subsequently exited the scheme after initially signing up for it. Delay in settlement of claims defeats the very purpose of the flagship Pradhan Mantri Fasal Bima Yojana said the Parliamentary Standing Committee On Agriculture in the report tabled in Lok Sabha on August 10, 2021

=== Other agriculture schemes launched by central government ===
Agriculture initiatives schemes launched by the central government are:

- 2020 Indian agriculture acts
- PM Kisan Tractor Yojana
- E-NAM for online agrimarketing
- Gramin Bhandaran Yojana for local storage
- Irrigation in India#Micro
- National Action Plan for Climate Change#NMSA
- National Scheme on Fisheries Training and Extension
- National Scheme on Welfare of Fishermen
- Pradhan Mantri Kisan Samman Nidhi for minimum support scheme
- Pradhan Mantri Krishi Sinchai Yojana for irrigation
- Agriculture in India#OF for organic farming
- Pradhan Mantri Fasal Bima Yojana, for crop insurance

== See also ==
- Agriculture in India
- Agricultural insurance in India
- Irrigation in India
- Rashtriya Krishi Vikas Yojana
