= E-NAM =

Government of India online agri-commodities marketplace

National Agriculture Market (eNAM)
- Type: Agricultural commodities marketplace
- Founded: 14 April 2016
- Owner: Ministry of Agriculture; Government of India
- Key people: Arjun Munda; Union Agriculture Minister
- Currency: Indian rupee (INR) (₹)
- Commodities: 176 agro products
- Volume: ₹1,22,000 crores means $187,692,307,692 (February 2021)
- Website: https://enam.gov.in/web/

National Agriculture Market or eNAM (where e is to be construed as electronic or digital) is an online trading platform for agricultural commodities in India. The market facilitates farmers, traders and buyers with online trading in commodities.

The market helps in better price discovery and providing facilities for smooth marketing of produce. The market transactions stood at ₹36,200 crore (equivalent to ₹530 billion or US$5.5 billion in 2026) by January 2018, mostly intra-market. Over 90 commodities including staple food grains, vegetables and fruits are currently listed in its list of commodities available for trade.

Crops are weighed immediately, stock is lifted on the same day and the payments are cleared online. In February 2018, features like MIS dashboard, BHIM and also other features on the mobile app such as gate entry, payment through mobile phones and farmers database were added. Present trading is done mostly for intra-market, but in phases, it will be able to trade in inter-market, inter-state, creating a national market for agricultural commodities.

== History ==
It was launched by the Ministry of Agriculture, Government of India. The electronic market pilot across India was launched on 14 April 2016 by Prime Minister of India, Narendra Modi. The Portal is managed by Small Farmers Agribusiness Consortium (SFAC) with the technology provider, NFCL’s iKisan division. A similar project was initiated by the Congress government in the State of Karnataka, during UPA tenure and had been a great success. NDA government has rolled it out nationally.

== About ==
On the eNAM platform, farmers can opt to trade directly on their own through the mobile app or through registered commission agents.

The eNAM is linked with 1000 markets (APMCs) in 18 states and 2 union territory, with over 50 lakh farmer membership in 18 states. The market is helping traders and exporters in procuring quality products in bulk, at one place and ensure transparent financial transactions.

The Government plans to connect over 22,000 GrAMs, local farmers markets, with the platform. To provide better grading and assaying services, the Agriculture Department is looking at looping in AGMARK for better certification.

=== Technology ===
The trading is done online, with trading computers or through an eNAM mobile application is available on Android for farmers and traders to bid and complete a transaction on the app, available in 8 languages. The MIS dashboard was introduced in February 2018, to give a greater insight into the performance of each market (mandi) in terms of arrival and trade in commodities.

The payment network RTGS/NEFT, debit card and internet banking was also integrated into the app. In 2017 mobile payment, Unified Payment Interface (UPI) facility through BHIM support was added in the app. Kotak Mahindra Bank (KMBL) has been selected as a digital payments partner by the National Agriculture Market (eNAM). KMBL will enable and facilitate online transactions for all stakeholders on the eNAM platform, including farmers, traders and farmer producer organizations (FPOs). Under this initiative, Kotak Mahindra Bank will provide payment, clearing and settlement services on the eNAM platform to facilitate trade between a buyer and seller of agri produce. Kotak Mahindra Bank has integrated its payment system and portal directly with the payment interface of eNAM, to enable quick and safe transactions for agri participants who have joined the platform.

The mobile phone gate entry, integration of farmers database and e-learning module is available. The agents are mostly using the eNAM mobile App for trading on behalf of farmers. The critical operation of gate entry from e-NAM mobile app helps facilitate the farmers to do advance gate entry on mobile app, which in turn will reduce a lot of time for farmers coming into the market and will bring huge efficiency and facilitate smooth arrival recording at the gate. A new feature has been introduced for farmers, where they can see the progress of their lot being traded and also real time bidding progress of price will be visible to farmers on their mobile app.

== Adoption ==
The six States with the most eNAMs as of March 2021 are Uttar Pradesh – 125 (Led by Mr. Anshul Sharma from SP Team), Madhya Pradesh – 80, Haryana - 81, Maharashtra – 118, Gujarat – 122, Telangana – 57 and Punjab - 37 (Led by Ajay Bansal from SP Team).

== Objectives ==
- A national e-market platform for transparent sale transactions and price discovery initially in regulated markets. Willing States to accordingly enact suitable provisions in their APMC Act for promotion of e-trading by their State Agricultural Marketing Board/APMC.
- Liberal licensing of traders/buyers and commission agents by State authorities without any pre-condition of physical presence or possession of shop /premises in the market yard.
- One license for a trader valid across all markets in the State.
- Harmonisation of quality standards of agricultural produce and provision for assaying (quality testing) infrastructure in every market to enable informed bidding by buyers. Common tradable parameters have so far been developed for 25 commodities.
- Single point levy of market fees, i.e. on the first wholesale purchase from the farmer.
- Provision of Soil Testing Laboratories in/ or near the selected mandi to facilitate visiting farmers to access this facility in the mandi itself. M/s. Nagarjuna Fertilizers and Chemicals Ltd. is the Strategic Partner (SP) who is responsible for the development, operation and maintenance of the platform. The broad role of the Strategic Partner is comprehensive and includes the writing of the software, customizing it to meet the specific requirements of the mandis in the States willing to integrate with NAM and running the platform

== Implementing Agency ==
Small Farmers’ Agribusiness Consortium (SFAC) is the lead promoter of NAM. SFAC is a registered society of the Department of Agriculture, Cooperation & Farmers’ Welfare (DAC&FW) under the Ministry of Agriculture and Farmer Welfare. SFAC through open tender selected Nagarjuna Fertilizers and Chemicals Ltd / Ikisan Division as Strategic Partner (SP) to develop, operate and maintain the NAM e-platform. SFAC implements NAM with the technical support of SP and budgetary grant support from DAC&FW. DAC&FW meets the expenses on software and its customization for the States and is providing it for free. DAC&FW is also giving a grant as one time fixed cost up to ₹30 lakhs per Mandi (other than to the private mandis) for installation of the e-market platform. Around 6500 APMCs operate throughout the country of which 585 district level mandis in States/UTs desirous of joining are planned to be linked by NAM. 470 mandis are planned to be integrated by March 2017 and the remaining by March 2018.

== Funds Allocation ==
The Cabinet Committee on Economic Affairs had approved a Central Sector Scheme for Promotion of National Agricultural Market through Agri-Tech Infrastructure Fund (ATIF). The government has allocated ₹200 crores to the newly created ATIF. With this fund SFAC will implement NAM for three years from 2015-16 to 2017-18. Each market is given ₹30 lakhs by the department.

== Advantages for various stakeholders ==
- Farmers: They can sell products without the interference of any brokers or middlemen thereby making competitive returns out of their investment.
- Traders: Traders will be able to do secondary trading from one APMC to another one anywhere in India. Local traders can get access to the larger national market for secondary trading.
- Buyers, Processers & Exporters

Buyers like large retailers, processors or exporters will be able to source commodities from any mandi in India thereby reducing the inter-mediation cost. Their physical presence and dependence on intermediaries will not be needed.

- Consumers

NAM will increase the number of traders and the competition among them increases. This translates into stable prices and availability to the consumers.

- Mandis

There will be a reduction in bookkeeping and reporting system as it will be generated automatically. Monitoring and regulation of traders and commission agents become easy. Transparency in the process eliminates the scope of manipulation of tendering/auctioning process. Market allocation fee will increase due to an accounting of all transactions taking place in the market. It will reduce the manpower requirements as the tendering/auctioning process is carried out electronically. For instance, the system declares the winner of lots within a few seconds. It eliminates information asymmetry as all the activities of an APMC can be known directly from the website.

- Others

NAM aims to improve the marketing aspect of the agriculture sector. With one license for the entire state and single point levy, an entire state becomes a market and the market fragmentation within the same state gets abolished. It will improve the supply chain of commodities and reduces wastages.

=== Other agriculture schemes launched by Modi regime ===
Agriculture initiatives schemes launched by the Narendra Modi regime are:

- 2020 Indian agriculture acts
- Atal Bhujal Yojana
- E-NAM, for online agrimarketing
- Gramin Bhandaran Yojana for local storage
- Micro Irrigation Fund (MIF)
- National Mission For Sustainable Agriculture (NMSA)
- National Scheme on Fisheries Training and Extension
- National Scheme on Welfare of Fishermen
- Pradhan Mantri Kisan Samman Nidhi (PMKSN) for minimum support scheme
- Pradhan Mantri Krishi Sinchai Yojana (PMKSY) for irrigation
- Paramparagat Krishi Vikas Yojana (PKVY) for organic farming
- Pradhan Mantri Fasal Bima Yojana (PMFBY) for crop insurance

== See also ==
- Agriculture in India
- Agricultural insurance in India
- Irrigation in India
- Rashtriya Krishi Vikas Yojana
