= Pradhan Mantri Krishi Sinchai Yojana =

Initiative to improve farm productivity

Pradhan Mantri Krishi Sinchai Yojana (PMKSY)
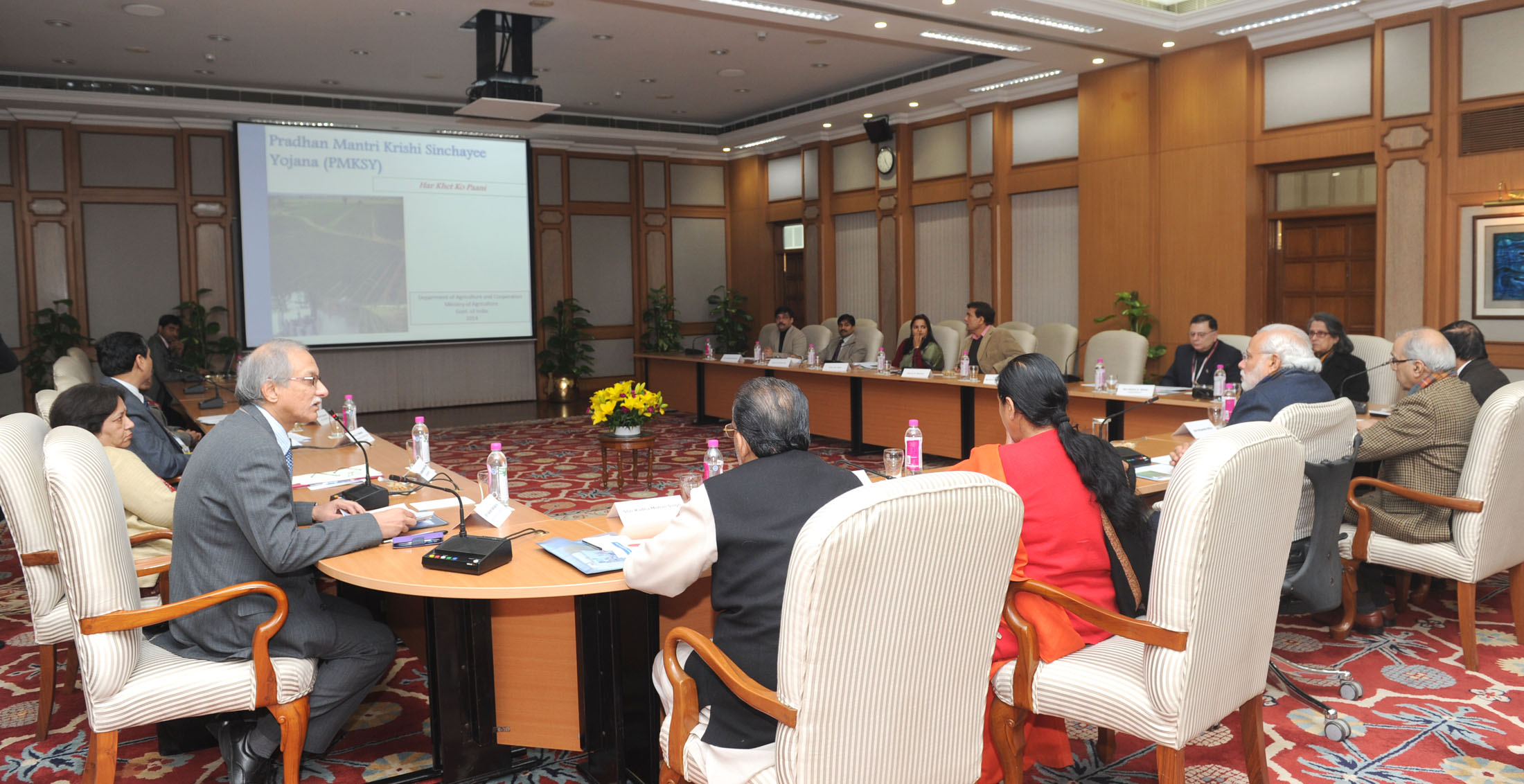
- Prime Minister of India chairing a high level meeting with officials regarding the Pradhan Mantri Krishi Sinchai Yojana
- Country: India
- Prime Minister(s): Narendra Modi
- Ministry: Jal shakti Mantralaya, ministry of rural development, ministry of agriculture
- Budget: US$379.8 Million Dollar(2600 Crore)
- Status: Active

Pradhan Mantri Krishi Sinchai Yojana (Hindi: प्रधानमंत्री कृषि सिंचाई योजना) is a national mission to improve farm productivity and ensure better utilization of the resources in the country. The budget of ₹53 billion (US$630 million) in a time span of one year 2015-2016 has been allocated to this scheme. The decision was taken on 1 July 2015 at the meeting of Cabinet Committee on Economic Affairs, approved with an outlay of 50000 crore for period of 5 years (2015-16 to 2019-20).

== Major objectives ==
- Convergence of investment in irrigation at the field level
- Expand cultivable area under irrigation (हर खेत को पानी)
- Improve On-farm water use efficiency to reduce wastage of water
- Enhance the adoption of being precise in irrigation and other water saving technologies (more crop per drop)

== Purpose ==
The primary objectives of PMKSY are to attract investments in irrigation system at field level, develop and expand cultivable land in the country, enhance ranch water use in order to minimize wastage of water, enhance crop per drop by implementing water-saving technologies and precision irrigation. The plan additionally calls for bringing ministries, offices, organizations, research and financial institutions occupied with creation and recycling of water under one platform so that an exhaustive and holistic outlook of the whole water cycle is considered. The goal is to open the doors for optimal water budgeting in all sectors. Tagline for PMKSY is "more crop per drop".

The Integrated Watershed Management programme was subsumed into the current PMKSY on 26 October 2015. The core implementation activities of IWMP were unchanged and were as per the Common Guidelines 2008 (Revised 2011) of IWMP. Convergence with other Central and State Government schemes, remains the top of the agenda for the programme towards optimal and judicious utilization of financial resources. Action has also been taken to undertake Natural Resources Management activities by utilizing labour component of MGNREGS and to undertake some of the Entry Point Activities in convergence with Swachh Bharat Mission (Gramin).

=== Other agriculture schemes launched by Modi regime ===
Agriculture initiatives schemes launched by the Narendra Modi regime are:

- 2020 Indian agriculture acts
- Atal Bhujal Yojana
- E-NAM for online agrimarketing
- Gramin Bhandaran Yojana for local storage
- Micro Irrigation Fund (MIF)
- National Mission For Sustainable Agriculture (NMSA)
- National Scheme on Fisheries Training and Extension
- National Scheme on Welfare of Fishermen
- Pradhan Mantri Kisan Samman Nidhi (PMKSN) for minimum support scheme
- Pradhan Mantri Krishi Sinchai Yojana (PMKSY) for irrigation
- Paramparagat Krishi Vikas Yojana (PKVY) for organic farming
- Pradhan Mantri Fasal Bima Yojana (PMFBY) for crop insurance
- In July 2025, the Union Cabinet raised the outlay for the Pradhan Mantri Kisan Sampada Yojana (PMKSY) to ₹6,520 crore, including ₹1,920 crore additional funding for the 15th Finance Commission cycle. The approval supports 50 food irradiation units and 100 NABL-accredited food testing labs under the scheme’s cold chain and food safety components.

== See also ==
- Agriculture in India
- Agricultural insurance in India
- Irrigation in India
- Rashtriya Krishi Vikas Yojana
