= Agricultural insurance in India =

An Indian farmer

Agriculture in India is highly susceptible to risks like droughts and floods. It is necessary to protect the farmers from natural calamities and ensure their credit eligibility for the next season. For this purpose, the Government of India introduced many agricultural social insurances throughout the country, the most important one of them being Pradhan Mantri Fasal Bima Yojana.

== Current insurance schemes ==
=== Pradhan Mantri Fasal Bima Yojana ===
The Pradhan Mantri Fasal Bima Yojana (Prime Minister's Crop Insurance Scheme) was launched by Prime Minister of India Narendra Modi on 13 February 2016.

=== Livestock Insurance Scheme ===
Livestock Insurance Scheme in India provided "provide protection mechanism to the farmers and cattle rearers against any eventual loss of their animals due to death and to demonstrate the benefit of the insurance of livestock to the people and popularize it with the ultimate goal of attaining qualitative improvement in livestock and their products."

=== Other agriculture schemes launched by Modi regime ===
Agriculture initiatives schemes launched by the Modi regime are:

- 2020 Indian agriculture acts
- Atal Bhujal Yojana
- E-NAM for online agrimarketing
- Gramin Bhandaran Yojana for local storage
- Micro Irrigation Fund (MIF)
- National Mission For Sustainable Agriculture (NMSA)
- National Scheme on Fisheries Training and Extension
- National Scheme on Welfare of Fishermen
- Pradhan Mantri Kisan Samman Nidhi (PMKSN) for minimum support scheme
- Pradhan Mantri Krishi Sinchai Yojana (PMKSY) for irrigation
- Paramparagat Krishi Vikas Yojana (PKVY) for organic farming
- Pradhan Mantri Fasal Bima Yojana (PMFBY) for crop insurance
- Farmer Income Protection Scheme (PM AASHA)

== Previous schemes ==
=== Farm Income Insurance Scheme ===
The Central Government formulated the Farm Income Insurance Scheme (FIIS) during 2003-04. The two critical components of a farmer's income are yield and price. FIIS targeted these two components through a single insurance policy so that the insured farmer could get a guaranteed income.

The scheme provided income protection to the farmers by insuring production and market risks. The insured farmers were ensured minimum guaranteed income (that is, average yield multiplied by the minimum support price). If the actual income was less than the guaranteed income, the insured would be compensated to the extent of the shortfall by the Agriculture Insurance Company of India. Initially, the scheme would cover only wheat and rice and would be compulsory for farmers availing crop loans. NAIS (explained in the section below) would be withdrawn for the crops covered under FIIS, but would continue to be applicable for other crops.

The FIIS was withdrawn in 2004.

=== National Agriculture Insurance Scheme ===
The Government of India experimented with a comprehensive crop insurance scheme which failed. The Government then introduced in 1999-2000, a new scheme titled “National Agricultural Insurance Scheme” (NAIS) or “Rashtriya Krishi Bima Yojana” (RKBY). NAIS envisages coverage of all food crops (cereals and pulses), oilseeds, horticultural and commercial crops. It covers all farmers, both loanees and non-loanees, under the scheme.

The premium rates vary from 1.5 percent to 3.5 percent of sum assured for food crops. In the case of horticultural and commercial crops, actuarial rates are charged. Small and marginal farmers are entitled to a subsidy of 50 percent of the premium charged- the subsidy is shared equally between the Government of India and the States. The subsidy is to be phased out over a period of 5 years.

NAIS operates on the basis of

1. Area approach
2. On individual basis- for localized calamities such as hailstorms, landslides, cyclones and floods.

Under the scheme, each state is required to reach the level Gram Panchayat as the unit of insurance in a maximum period of 3 years. Agriculture Insurance Corporation of India is implementing the scheme. This scheme is replaced by Pradhan Mantri Fasal Bima Yojana.

== Economic interactions ==
The minimum support price subsidy influences insurance pricing. The insurable interest is calculated as normal for an unsubsidised crop, but for subsidised crops the MSP is used. This distorts the function of the insurance market. Although this program is intended to increase per farmer income – a goal advocated by Bhimrao Ramji Ambedkar – setting an artificial price also impairs decision making in crop insurance – also a major policy focus for Ambedkar, the subject of many of his public speeches, and some of his academic work.
