= Nizamabad Agriculture Market =

Nizamabad Agriculture Market also NAMC is an agriculture market located in Nizamabad, Telangana, India.[1] It is second-biggest grain market in Telangana. It is spread over 67 acres. The market won the award for the best eNAM market in India in 2016.

== History ==
The market was started in 1933 during the time of the Nizams, the second largest market yard in Telangana. It is run by the Agriculture Market Committee of Marketing Department, Government of Telangana. The market is spread over 67 acres.

== The Market ==
The market receives commodities like paddy, maize, turmeric, pulses, soybean, sunflower, aamchur, onions, and other crops. It is known for its turmeric in India.

== e-NAM project ==
The Nuizamabad market was selected one among 40 markets in Telangana by Government of India for National Agriculture Market Project (NAM project) on 14 April 2016. Using of electronic weighing scales was one of the reasons for its selection. This project helps with its new electronic trade system called e-NAM, any trader from participating markets can buy produce at the market and also reduce middlemen.

Before eNAM project the turmeric farmers use to visit Sangli market in Maharashtra to get better price.

== Award ==
The market won the national award for best eNAM market in the country.
