= 2019 Interim-Union budget of India =

Government budget

2019 Union Budget of India
- Emblem of India
- Submitted: 2 February 2019
- Submitted by: Piyush Goyal, Minister of Finance (India) (Additional Charge)
- Country: India
- Party: BJP
- Total revenue: ₹2,732,903 crore (equivalent to ₹37 trillion or US$400 billion in 2026)
- Total expenditures: ₹3,401,639 crore (equivalent to ₹46 trillion or US$490 billion in 2026)

The 2019 Interim Union Budget of India was presented by acting Finance Minister Piyush Goyal on 1 February 2019. The government introduced two major initiatives of Pradhan Mantri Kisan Samman Nidhi and Pradhan Mantri Shram Yogi Mandhan.

== Highlights ==
In the budget, the fiscal deficit for 2019–20 was indicated as 3.94% of GDP. A budget of ₹6,000 (US$64) was set aside for nearly 12 crore small farmers having up to 2 hectares of land. This amount would be available in 3 equal installments of INR 2000 each under the Pradhan Mantri Kisan Samman Nidhi program. Under the Pradhan Mantri Shram Yogi Mandhan newly introduced scheme, a ₹3,000 (US$32) per month pension for unorganized sector labor after 60 years of age was allotted. The subscribers of this scheme would have to pay a monthly amount of Rs.100, if aged 29 years and above and Rs.55 if 18 years of age.

Funds for Rashtriya Gokul mission were increased to ₹750 (US$8.00) and a Rashtriya Kamdhenu Aayog was set up to promote indigenous breeds of cows and to promote supporting income opportunities. Under the Ministry of Animal Husbandry, Dairying and Fisheries a separate department of fisheries was added.

Income tax relief u/s 87A for income up to ₹500,000 (US$5,300). Standard deduction of ₹50,000 (US$530) for salaried class. Defence was allocated a budget of ₹300,000 (US$3,200), which was the highest so far.

In the 2018 Budget, the outlay was revised for six key social schemes focused on enhancing the welfare of farmers and the poor, in addition to announcing a new scheme aimed at direct cash transfers to farmers. Apart from that, allocation across three other schemes focused on rural India have been raised.
