= Indian agroforestry policy =

National Agroforestry policy of India

The National Agroforestry Policy of India is a comprehensive policy framework designed to improve agricultural livelihoods by maximizing agricultural productivity for mitigating climate change. The Government of India launched the policy in February 2014 during the World Congress on Agroforestry, held in Delhi. India became the first country in the world to adopt an agroforestry policy.

The policy aims to improve productivity and environmental sustainability by integrating trees, crops, and livestock into the same plot of land. It was created to counteract limited agricultural productivity due to consistent decreases in the land-holding share of farmers, which was caused by rapid population growth and agricultural activity dependent on seasonal rainfall.

== Background ==
Throughout the world, most agroforestry systems have been practiced since the Neolithic period. Indians consider Ashok Vatika, a garden in Hindu epic Ramayana, which consisted of plants and fruit-bearing trees, as an example of an agroforestry system. Even today, there are many rituals associated with the trees and agricultural farms in India. Since the 1970s, in line with initiatives taken by other countries, the Indian government has also promoted research in the field of agroforestry. Even though agriculture was valued by social and religious practices; some experts noted that various government regulations were seen as an impediment in advancing agroforestry.

Another aspect for the need of an agroforestry policy was the lack of the forest and tree cover in India. According to the Forest Survey of India in 2019, the country had 80.7 million hectares of forest and tree cover, which accounts to 24.56% of the total geographic area in the country; however, the country requires one third (33.3%) of its land under forest and tree cover, according to the National Forest Policy.

== Policy ==
Before 2014, as there was no dedicated government agency overlooking agroforestry in India, it could not amass enough encouragement from the government. Although agroforestry was practiced on a restricted scale, 60% of the country's timber requirement was fulfilled by the same. Experts traced the reasons for such limited results to mainly technical, regulatory, and financial hurdles faced by farmers, which raised the need for an agroforestry policy in India.

=== Goals ===
- Setting up a national nodal authority to bring in coordination among different schemes, programs, and policies pertaining to agroforestry spread across diverse agriculture development sectors of the government.
- Raising the economic condition of small farmers by increasing productivity and exploiting agroforestry systems.
- Preserving the environment and meeting the increasing requirements of timber and other agroforestry products.
- Growing the forest and tree cover in the country.

=== Strategy ===
- Establishing a Mission or a Board under the Ministry of Agriculture to coordinate, plan, and implement between various inter-ministerial agencies, agroforestry related requirements, and policies like mobilization of financial resources, technical and management assistance to the farmers, and facilitation of capacity building initiatives.
- Leveraging various ongoing schemes and programs of the Government of India to carry out and promote agroforestry systems like MGNREGA, NRLM, and RKVY. Various state governments may establish a nodal authority to implement agroforestry schemes at the district level by partnering with KVGs, NGOs, farmers' cooperative societies, and private sector and other concerned agencies.
- Encouraging research in agroforestry and nominating ICAR and ICRAF to initiate the research and development (R&D) of agroforestry.
- Simplifying various laws and procedures related to harvest and transit of agroforestry products within the state.
- Decentralizing the regulatory mechanisms and empower various institutions at the local level.
- Creating and maintenance of a database and information systems relating to various aspects of agroforestry systems.
- Providing easy access for farmers to quality seeds, fertilizers, and other agroforestry planting materials through certifying nurseries and leveraging private sector cooperation. Arranging easy access to markets for farmers.
- Arranging institutional credit and insurance facilities to farmers practicing agroforestry systems.

== Reception ==
=== Challenges ===
Any policy or government scheme needs wide acceptance among its beneficiaries to be successful. Among the many challenges to the national agroforestry policy are that farmers believe cultivating trees around farmland is counterproductive to their main source of income by reducing the crop yield by 40–60%. The government has a challenge in educating farmers towards plant-to-plant interactions and making suggestions to the farmers based on empirical evidence on productive plantations.

=== Criticism ===
Many experts believe the agroforestry policy is a damage control measure against the National Forest Act of 2006, which intends to provide forest land to tribals, allowing them to practice agriculture. However, Kishore Rithe, a former member of the National Board for Wildlife, observes that tribals will eventually cut down trees and practice agriculture. Both policies are contradictory to each other. Some commentators have questioned the profit-sharing method, which involves private owners in afforestation efforts. They believe the government, through this policy, is converting the agricultural land into a manufacturing enterprise, which could damage the ecological balance in the region.
