= Krishi Jagran =

Magazine dedicated exclusively to agriculture

- Type: Monthly magazine/journal
- Format: 12 languages
- Owner: M.C. Dominic
- Founded: September 5, 1996
- Headquarters: New Delhi, India
- Website: www.krishijagran.com

Krishi Jagran is a magazine dedicated exclusively to agriculture. It is published in 12 Indian regional languages—Hindi, Punjabi, Gujarati, Marathi, Kannada, Telugu, Bengali, Assamese, Odia, Tamil, Malayalam and English. In English it is published as Agriculture World. The magazine was founded by M.C. Dominic on September 5, 1996, in New Delhi.

== Overview ==
Krishi Jagran covers a wide range of topics related to agriculture, including crop production, agri-technology, market trends, government schemes, rural development, and success stories of progressive farmers. The publication serves as a bridge between policy makers, scientists, agri-businesses, and the farming community.

== Multilingual reach ==
The magazine holds a unique distinction of being published in 12 Indian languages, which enables it to reach a vast and diverse rural audience across the country. These languages include: Hindi, Punjabi, Gujarati, Marathi, Kannada, Telugu, Bengali, Assamese, Odia, Tamil, Malayalam, and English (published under the name Agriculture World).

== English edition: Agriculture World ==
The English-language edition of Krishi Jagran is published as Agriculture World. It targets a more urban, policy-oriented, and professional readership including agri-business leaders, academics, and researchers.

== Founder ==
M. C. Dominic, the founder of Krishi Jagran, is a veteran in agri-journalism. His vision was to empower farmers with practical knowledge and help modernize Indian agriculture through timely and relevant information dissemination.

== Awards and recognition ==
Krishi Jagran has received several accolades for its contribution to agricultural journalism and rural communication in India. Some notable awards and recognitions include:

- Limca Book of Records (2018): Krishi Jagran was recognized for publishing the largest number of magazines in different languages from a single source, making it one of the most linguistically diverse agricultural publications in the world.
- FAI Award for Excellence in Agricultural Journalism: The Fertiliser Association of India (FAI) honored Krishi Jagran for its outstanding work in disseminating agricultural knowledge and promoting sustainable farming practices.
- Rashtriya Krishi Vikas Yojana (RKVY) Partnership Recognition: The magazine has been acknowledged by various state agricultural departments for its role in promoting awareness about government schemes such as RKVY and Pradhan Mantri Fasal Bima Yojana.
- Founder M. C. Dominic has been individually honored by several agricultural bodies and institutions for his leadership in agri-media, including awards for rural empowerment and communication excellence.

== Recognition and impact ==
Over the years, Krishi Jagran has been recognized as a trusted source of agricultural information in India. Its widespread reach in rural India has helped in the dissemination of modern agricultural practices and government policies to the grassroots level.
