= INDOS =

INDoS (Indian National Database Of Seafarers) is a computerised national database of Indian seafarers for use by statutory authorities such as Flag State, Port State, Immigration & Employers etc., to prevent the fraudulent issue of certificates. The database includes data like the seafarer's address, photographs, signature, telephone, etc. An INDos number consists of eight alphanumeric characters. Henceforth, no seafarer without an INDos number will be admitted to any course other than a three-month pre-sea training course in India.

All Indian and foreign nationals holding a COC (Certificate of Competency) granted by the Government of India or an Indian CDC (Continuous Discharge Certificate) or who have completed modular courses approved by DG Shipping are listed in the database. Courses not approved by the Government of India, except GMDSS, will not be included in the INDos data, but the new rule enforces institutes to upload GOC data on DGS website which requires INDos No:.

The advantage to seafarers is that they do not need to carry the original document while training ashore with the implementation of INDos. For example, at present, a second mate has to undergo seven modular courses and one competency course for which he has to carry all his original documents. Once he has an INDOs certificate, he does have to produce the original document for admission to any course in India. Furthermore, in case of the loss of original documents, the INDos will help in retrieving a duplicate certificate. Notwithstanding INDos, seafarers still need to carry the original document while serving on board a ship.

Clip from DGshipping notice as refer below link- quote 'Every seafarer shall obtain INDos No certificate from the assessment centers /LBS CAMSAR, Mumbai.'

Details of documents issued by government authorities like COCs, Letters of Authority for issue of a COC (commonly referred to as a "Blue Chit"), endorsements for serving on special ship types, CDCs, etc., issued in due course are directly communicated to the INDos centre for updating the data. Such details are not accepted from the seafarer.

== See also ==
- Borders of India
- Climate of India
- Coastal India
- Exclusive economic zone of India
- Fishing in India
- Outline of India
