= Agriculture MMP =

E-governance project in India

The Agriculture Mission Mode Project is one of the 27 Mission Mode Projects (MMPs) of the National e-Governance Plan of the Government of India. It is being run under the direction of the Department of Agriculture and Cooperation within the Ministry of Agriculture.

== Requirement ==
In 2005, several experts recommended e-governance to develop agriculture and provide services to livestock owners, farmers, and NGOs. The services suggested included timely information during disasters to minimize loss of life and material. The information provided can also help make decisions with data about the market.

The Department of Agriculture and Cooperation (DAC) had several e-governance initiatives in the field of agriculture. States have also implemented such projects.

The Agriculture MMP aims to replicate the agricultural e-governance projects being carried in different states at a national level and provide the services through multiple delivery channels such as the centralized agricultural portal, Kisan Centres, touch screens, and mobiles. This project stresses on using IT in all stages of the agricultural crop cycle including the crop selection stage, the pre-cultivation stage, the crop management stage, the pre-harvest stage, the harvesting stage and the post-harvest stage. The project focuses on providing informational services to farmers on a variety of farm-related issues including seeds, soil test-based information, fertilizers, pests, government schemes, and weather.

== Work in States ==
It is proposed to complete the project over a period of 32 months after the approval of the project. Initially, the project is to be rolled out in the 1505 blocks of 187 districts in the seven states of Assam, Himachal Pradesh, Jharkhand, Karnataka, Kerala, Maharashtra, Madhya Pradesh.

In Himachal Pradesh, the state-level AGRISNET website www.hpagrisnet.gov.in, has been rolled out under this project which can be also accessed through 2,664 Lok Mitra Kendras set up at the panchayat-level. The services being offered include best practices, market information, expert advisory for diseases and forms. In Madhya Pradesh, a state-level empowerment committee has been constituted with Agriculture Production Commissioner, Madhya Pradesh as the chairperson to implement NeGP-A.
