= Gramin Agriculture Markets =

Gramin Agriculture Markets also GrAM is a village level markets in India. There are 22,000 such rural agricultural markets, Which help farmers in selling their produce locally. These local markets, GrAMs, will be linked with the electronic farmer marketplace, eNAMs to sell their produce nationally.

== The Market ==
Through upgrade to GrAM, such unorganized markets which will help farmers to get realize and sell best price for produce in the country.
