= Ministry of Agriculture and Farmers' Welfare =

Agriculture ministry of India

- Branch of Government of India

- Ministry of Agriculture & Farmers Welfare

Agency overview
- Formed: June 1871; 155 years ago
- Jurisdiction: Government of India
- Headquarters: Krishi Bhavan Dr. Rajendra Prasad Road New Delhi
- Annual budget: ₹140,529 crore (US$15 billion) (2026-27 est.)
- Ministers responsible: Shivraj Singh Chouhan, (Cabinet Minister); Bhagirath Choudhary, (Minister of State); Ram Nath Thakur, (Minister of State)
- Agency executive: Atish Chandra, Secretary
- Website: agriwelfare.gov.in dare.gov.in

The Ministry of Agriculture and Farmers' Welfare, formerly the Ministry of Agriculture, is a branch of the Government of India and the apex body for formulation and administration of the rules and regulations and laws related to agriculture in India. The three broad areas of scope for the Ministry are agriculture, food processing and co-operation. The agriculture ministry is headed by the Minister of Agriculture and Farmers' Welfare which is currently held by Shivraj Singh Chouhan. Kailash Choudhary and Shobha Karandlaje are the Ministers of State. Sharad Pawar, serving from 22 May 2004 to 26 May 2014, has held the office of Minister of Agriculture for the longest continuous period till date.

== Origins ==
Department of Revenue and Agriculture and Commerce was set up in June 1871 to deal with all the agricultural matters in India. Until this ministry was established, matters related to agriculture were within the portfolio of the Home Department.

In 1881, Department of Revenue and Agriculture was set up to deal with combined portfolios of education, health, agriculture, revenue. However, In 1947, Department of Agriculture was redesignated as Ministry of Agriculture.

The Ministry of Agriculture was renamed as the Ministry for Agriculture and Farmers' Welfare on 15 August 2015, to take care of farming community needs.

== Structure and departments ==
The Ministry of Agriculture and Farmers' Welfare consists of the following two departments.

- Department of Agriculture and Farmers Welfare:- This Department's responsibilities are assigned to it in the Government of India (Allocation of Business) Rules, 1961 as amended from time to time. Co-operation in this context refers largely to promote farmer co-operative movements. The Agriculture MMP is another program run by this depart that aims to replicate the agricultural e-governance projects being carried in different states at a national level and through a variety of media.
- Department of Agricultural Research and Education (DARE):- This Department's responsibilities are basic and operation research, technology development, improving linkages between various organizations and state governments across the country. In addition, this department manages the Indian Council of Agricultural Research.

The administrative head of the Ministry is the Secretaries of the two departments.

=== Agencies ===
1. National Rainfed Area Authority
2. National Horticulture Board
3. Coconut Development Board
4. Directorate of Cashewnut and Cocoa Development
5. Directorate of Oilseeds Development
6. National Farmers Welfare Program Implementation Society
7. National Institute of Agricultural Extension Management (MANAGE), an autonomous organisation
8. Small Farmers' Agri-Business Consortium, Society promoted by Dept. of Agriculture and Farmers Welfare

==== Autonomous Bodies ====
1. C.C.S. National Institute of Agricultural Marketing, Jaipur

==== Statutory Body ====
1. Protection of Plant Varieties and Farmers' Rights Authority, New Delhi

==== Public Sector Undertakings ====
1. Agrinnovate India Limited (AgIn)

== Programs and initiatives ==
=== Rashtriya Krishi Vikas Yojana ===
A leading program of the Ministry is the Rashtriya Krishi Vikas Yojana, which was launched in 2007 on the recommendations of the National Development Council of India. This program sought to improve the overall state of agriculture in India by providing stronger planning, better coordination, and greater funding to improve productivity and overall output. The total budget for this program in 2009-10 was just over INR 38,000 crore.

=== Krishi Megh ===
Krishi Megh (National Agricultural Research and Education System-Cloud Infrastructure and Services) is a data recovery center of Indian Council of Agricultural Research (ICAR), the premier agricultural research organization of the Government of India. It will help in protecting the precious data of ICAR. It has been set up at National Academy of Agricultural Research and Management, Hyderabad. The portal aims at providing the high-quality and latest information in the agricultural sector to the stakeholders and also aims to provide relevant information to agricultural university students. It has been launched under the Government of India and World Bank's Jointly funded project called National agricultural higher education project (NAHEP).

=== Schemes ===
- Pradhan Mantri Krishi Sinchai Yojana
- Pradhan Mantri Kisan Samman Nidhi
- Farmer Income Protection Scheme (PM AASHA)

== Reports and statistics ==
The Ministry publishes an annual report titled "Agricultural Statistics at a Glance". This gives a detailed picture of the state of India's agriculture including demographics of the agrarian sector, crop production (including state-wise and crop-wise break-ups), rural economic indicators such as credit, etc. The latest report has been published for 2014.

== See also ==
- Minister of Agriculture and Farmers' Welfare
- Agricultural insurance in India
- National Portal of India
- Agriculture in India
- Farmers' suicides in India
- Health effects of pesticides
- Pesticide poisoning
- Environmental impact of pesticides
- Pesticide regulation in the United States
- Regulation of pesticides in the European Union
