= Agriculture Insurance Company of India =

Indian Public Sector Insurer

"Agriculture Insurance Company of India Ltd. (AIC)"
- Type: Central Public Sector Undertaking
- Industry: Agricultural Insurance
- Founded: 20 December 2002; 23 years ago
- Headquarters: Plate B & C, 5th Floor, Block 1, East Kidwai Nagar, New Delhi - 110023, India
- Key people: Ms. Girija Subramanian (Chairman & Managing Director)
- Services: Crop insurance
- Net income: ▲₹766 crore (US$80 million) (2022-23)
- Owner: Ministry of Finance, Government of India
- Number of employees: 377
- Website: www.aicofindia.com

Agriculture Insurance Company of India Limited (AIC) is an Indian public sector undertaking headquartered in New Delhi. It is a government-owned agricultural insurer under ownership of the Ministry of Finance, Government of India.

== History ==
AIC was incorporated on 20 December 2002 with an authorized capital of Rs. 1500 crore. The initial paid-up capital was Rs. 200 crores, which was subscribed by the promoting companies, General Insurance Corporation of India GIC (35%), NABARD (30%) and the four public-sector general insurance companies (8.75%) each, viz., National Insurance Co. Ltd., Oriental Insurance Co. Ltd., New India Assurance Co. Ltd., and United India Insurance Co. Ltd.

AIC is under the administrative control of Ministry of Finance, Government of India, and under the operational supervision of Ministry of Agriculture, Government of India. Insurance Regulatory and Development Authority (IRDA), Hyderabad, India, is the regulatory body governing AIC.

The Government of India designated AIC as the sole implementing agency for the National Agricultural Insurance Scheme (NAIS), a crop insurance programme.

From Kharif 2016, the Government has launched a new Crop Insurance Scheme – Pradhan Mantri Fasal Bima Yojna (PMFBY). AIC is the leading Implementing Agency of this Scheme.

Since its inception, AIC has participated in crop insurance schemes in India and has insured farmers under these programmes. According to available data, it accounts for over 50% of the crop insurance market in the country.

== See also ==
- Agricultural insurance in India
