= Small Farmers Agribusiness Consortium =

Government owned organization in India

Small Farmers Agribusiness Consortium (SFAC)
- लघु किसान कृषि व्यवसाय संघ (एसएफएसी)

Agency overview
- Formed: 18 January 1994
- Jurisdiction: Union Government of India
- Headquarters: Hauz Khas, New Delhi
- Employees: 15
- Agency executives: Maninder Kaur Dwivedi, Managing Director; Sanjeev Kumar Gautam, Director
- Website: www.sfacindia.com/

The Small Farmers Agribusiness Consortium (SFAC) is a government owned organization in India, established to promote the interests of small and marginal farmers by facilitating their integration into the agribusiness sector. SFAC is an autonomous society under the Department of Agriculture, Cooperation & Farmers Welfare, Ministry of Agriculture & Farmers Welfare, Government of India.

== History ==
It was established in 1994, to solve exclusion problem of small and marginal farmers in India from modern agriculture due to resource constraints. SFAC founded to bridge the gap, offering better income prospects by connecting these farmers with agribusinesses.
