= Pradhan Mantri Shram Yogi Mandhan =

Social welfare scheme

Pradhan Mantri Shram Yogi Maandhan is a social welfare scheme launched by the Ministry of Labour and Employment of the Government of India on 15 February 2019 for poor labourers in the unorganised sector from minimum 18 years of age to maximum 40 years. According to government figures, about 42 crore people in India are associated with the unorganized sector. These people have a chance to take advantage of this scheme.

== Provisions ==
Pradhan Mantri Shram Yogi Maandhan is available to unorganized workers between 18 and 40 years of age. Further, the monthly income of the worker should be below ₹15,000 (US$160). Under the scheme, the subscriber will receive a minimum assured pension of ₹3,000 (US$31) per month after attaining the age of 60 years. However, to benefit from the scheme, workers have to contribute ₹55 monthly (for age 18) and it varies according to age. Maximum contribution for a year cannot exceed ₹2400 (Rs.200 per month). Further, if the subscriber dies, the spouse of the beneficiary shall be entitled to receive 50% of the pension as family pension. Family pension is applicable only to spouse.

Due to the erratic nature of the works of unorganized sector, the exit provisions have been kept flexible. As such the subscriber can exit prematurely and the amount will be returned with interest at the saving bank account rate, or the rate at which the fund earned income (if the subscriber exits after a 10-year period), whichever is higher. Further, the spouse has the option to continue the scheme and to contribute on the subscriber's behalf.

To avail the scheme, the concerned person has to visit the Community Service Center. Aadhaar and Jan Dhan Bank account are necessary.
