= Farmer Income Protection Scheme (PM AASHA) =

Government Scheme in India

Farmer Income Protection Scheme (PM-AASHA)
- PM Annadata Aay Sanrakshan Abhiyan
- Type of project: Umbrella scheme, agriculture
- Country: India
- Established: 2018
- Status: Active

The Prime Minister's Farmer Income Protection Scheme (Hindi: प्रधानमंत्री अन्‍नदाता आय संरक्षण अभियान, romanized: Pradhan Mantri Annadata Aay Sanrakshan Abhiyan), also known as PM AASHA (पीएम-आशा) is an umbrella scheme of the Government of India announced in September 2018 to ensure a price policies such as a minimum support price are fulfilled. It includes the former Price Support Scheme (PSS), a Price Deficiency Payment Scheme (PDPS) and a Private Procurement & Stockist Scheme (PPPS).

== See also ==
- Deficiency payments
