= Pradhan Mantri Kisan Samman Nidhi =

Indian welfare scheme

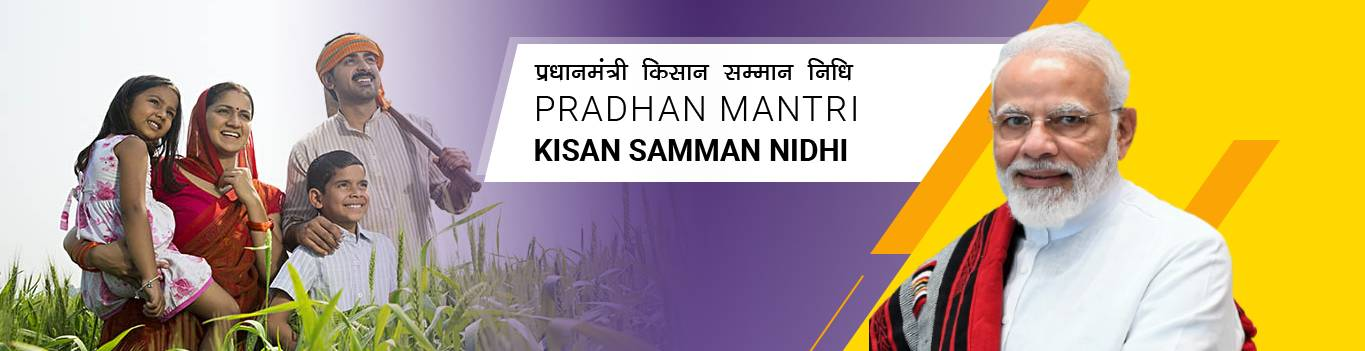
- Type of project: Governmental
- Country: India
- Ministry: Ministry of Agriculture and Farmers Welfare
- Key people: Vivek Aggarwal (IAS)
- Established: 1 February 2019; 7 years ago
- Budget: ₹75,000 crore (equivalent to ₹1.0 trillion or US$11 billion in 2026)
- Website: pmkisan.gov.in

Pradhan Mantri Kisan Samman Nidhi (PMKISAN, translation: Prime Minister's Farmer's Tribute Fund) is an initiative by the government of India that give farmers up to ₹6,000 (US$62) per year as minimum income support. The initiative was announced by Piyush Goyal during the 2019 Interim Union Budget of India on 1 February 2019. The scheme has cost ₹75,000 crore (equivalent to ₹1.0 trillion or US$11 billion in 2026) per annum and came into effect December 2018.

== History ==
The scheme was first conceived and implemented by Government of Telangana as the Rythu Bandhu scheme, where a certain amount is given directly to eligible farmers. The scheme has received accolades from various organisations for its successful implementation, including World Bank. Many economists suggest that this type of investment support is better than farm loan waivers. With the positive outcome of this scheme, Government of India wanted to implement it as nationwide project and it was announced by Piyush Goyal during the 2019 Interim Union Budget of India on 1 February 2019.

For 2018–2019, ₹20,000 crore was allocated under this scheme. On 24 February 2019, Narendra Modi launched the scheme in Gorakhpur, Uttar Pradesh, by transferring the first instalment of ₹2,000 each to over one crore farmers.

Ministry of Agriculture and Farmers Welfare has awarded the top-performing states, and districts under PM Kisan Samman Nidhi Yojana. In addition to PMKISAN, individuals can explore a wide range of government schemes aimed at providing financial assistance and support to farmers and other beneficiaries. It is based on the criteria such as correction of data, addressing farmer grievances, and timely physical verification exercise.

== Statistics ==
Number of beneficiaries benefitted under PM-KISAN during 18th instalment (August 2024-November 2024)
Serial No	State	No of Beneficiaries
1	ANDAMAN AND NICOBAR ISLANDS	12,832
2	ANDHRA PRADESH	41,22,499
3	ASSAM	18,87,562
4	BIHAR	75,81,009
5	CHANDIGARH	-
6	CHHATTISGARH	25,07,735
7	DELHI	10,829
8	GOA	6,333
9	GUJARAT	49,12,366
10	HARYANA	15,99,844
11	HIMACHAL PRADESH	8,17,537
12	JAMMU AND KASHMIR	8,58,630
13	JHARKHAND	19,97,366
14	KARNATAKA	43,48,125
15	KERALA	28,15,211
16	LADAKH	18,207
17	LAKSHADWEEP	2,198
18	MADHYA PRADESH	81,37,378
19	MAHARASHTRA	91,43,515
20	MANIPUR	85,932
21	MEGHALAYA	1,50,413
22	MIZORAM	1,10,960
23	NAGALAND	1,71,920
24	ODISHA	31,50,640
25	PUDUCHERRY	8,033
26	PUNJAB	9,26,106
27	RAJASTHAN	70,32,020
28	SIKKIM	28,103
29	TAMIL NADU	21,94,651
30	TELANGANA	30,77,426
31	THE DADRA AND NAGAR HAVELI AND DAMAN AND DIU	11,587
32	TRIPURA	2,29,362
33	UTTAR PRADESH	2,25,78,654
34	UTTARAKHAND	7,96,973
35	WEST BENGAL	45,03,158
36	Grand Total	9,59,25,578

== Comparison with similar schemes ==
Aspect	PM-Kisan	Rythu Bandhu	Annadatha Sukhibhava	KALIA scheme
Started by	Union Government of India	Telangana Government	Andhra Pradesh Government	Odisha Government
Establish Date	1 February 2019; 7 years ago	10 May 2018; 8 years ago	5 February 2019; 7 years ago	1 January 2019; 7 years ago
Unit	Per family	Per acre of land	Per family	Per family
Number of beneficiaries	Approximately 120 million	Approximately 6 million	Approximately 7 million	6 million families
Assistance	₹ 6,000 per year in three installments	₹ 10,000 per year per acre in two installments	₹9,000 extra in addition to PM Kisan benefit, ₹15,000 for non-beneficiaries of PM Kisan	₹5,000 per farm family over five seasons
Exclusion	Last year Income Tax Payers, Civil Servants with High Income	No exclusion	No exclusion	No exclusion
Cap	Small and marginal farmers Up to 2 hectares	Land holding of 51 acres agriculture land and 21 acres of dry land	No cap	Small and marginal farmers Up to 2 hectares
Eligibility	Landowners only	Landowners Only	Landowners and tenant cultivators	Landowners and tenant cultivators
Tenant farmers	Not covered	Not covered	Covered	Covered
Annual budget	₹ 700 billion	₹ 120 billion	₹ 50 billion	₹ 40 billion

== See also ==
- Agriculture in India
- Agricultural insurance in India
- Irrigation in India
- Rashtriya Krishi Vikas Yojana
