= Atal Bhujal Yojana =

National groundwater management scheme in India

- Country: India
- Launched: 25 December 2019; 6 years ago
- Status: active

Atal Bhujal Yojana (or, Atal Jal, lit Atal Groundwater Scheme or Atal Water) is a groundwater management scheme launched by Prime Minister Narendra Modi on the 95th birth anniversary of former Prime Minister Atal Bihari Vajpayee, on 25 December 2019. The purpose of the scheme is to improve groundwater management in seven states of India.

== History ==
In June 2018, the World Bank Board approved the scheme and it will be funded by the World Bank. It was launched on 25 December 2019 under the Jal Jeevan Mission.

Gujarat, Haryana, Karnataka, Madhya Pradesh, Maharashtra, Rajasthan and Uttar Pradesh are the designated priority states for improvement of groundwater management through community participation, impacting around 78 districts and 8350 gram panchayats. The duration of the scheme is from 2020 to 2025.

== See also ==
- Agriculture in India
- Irrigation in India
