= Fishing in India =

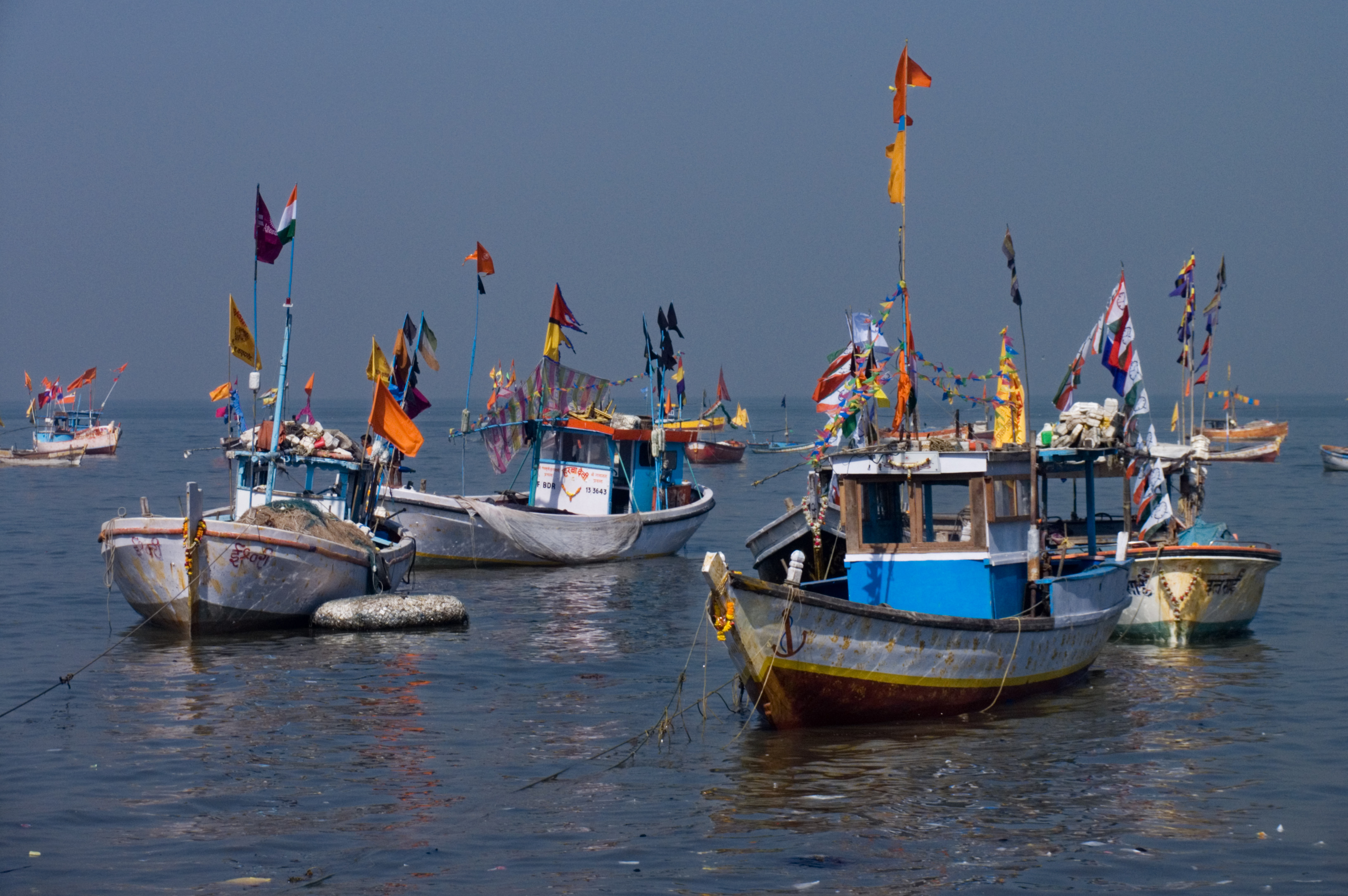
Fishing boats

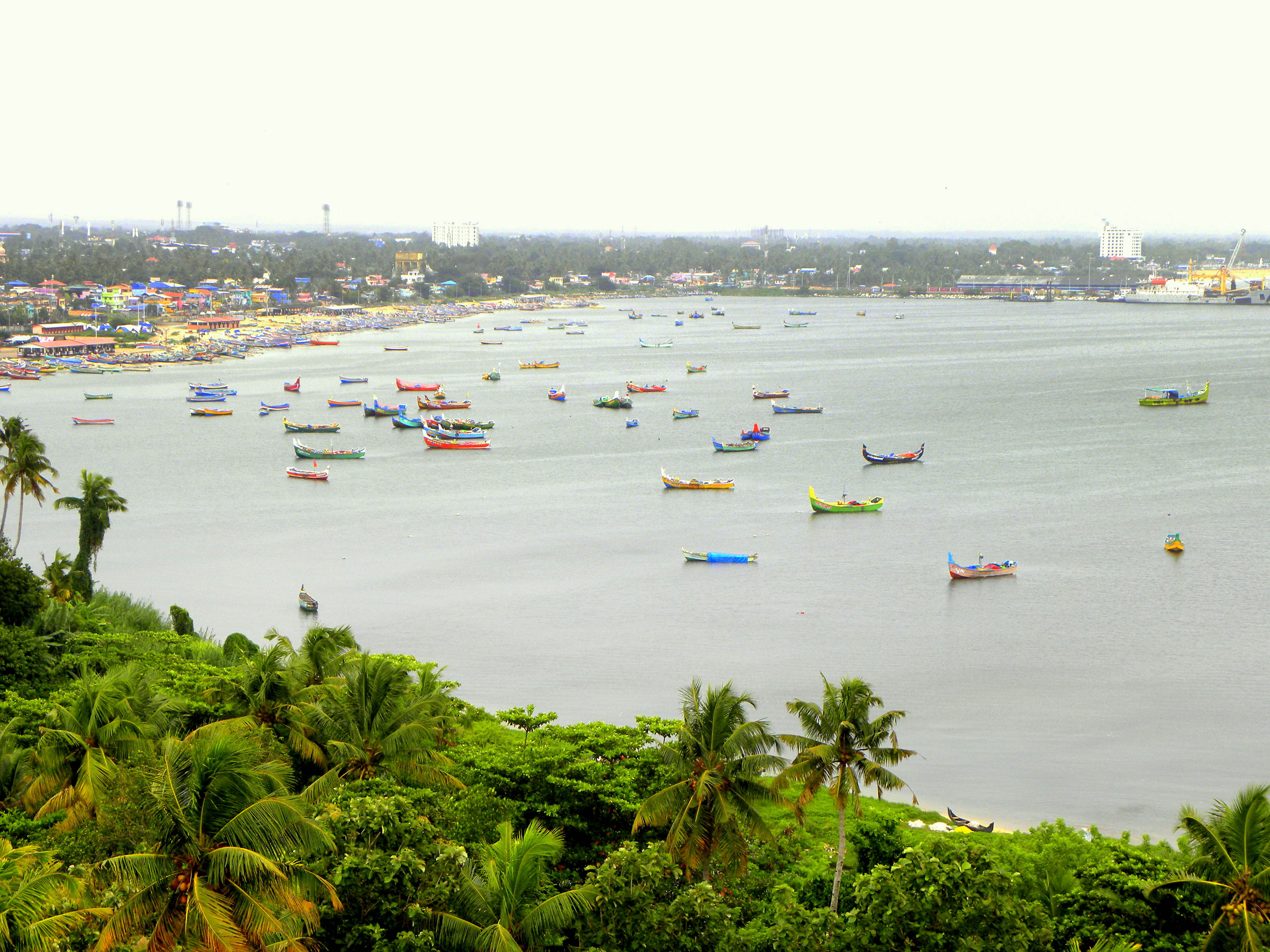
Fishing boats near Kollam in Kerala

Fishing in India is a major sector within the economy of India contributing 1.07% of its total GDP. The fishing sector in India supports the livelihood of over 28 million people in the country, especially within the marginalized and vulnerable communities. India is the third largest fish producing country in the world accounting for 7.96% of the global production and second largest producer of fish through aquaculture, after China. The total fish production during the FY 2020-21 is estimated at 14.73 million metric tonnes. According to the National Fisheries Development Board the Fisheries Industry generates an export earnings of Rs 334.41 billion. Centrally sponsored schemes will increase exports by Rs 1 lakh crore in FY25. 65,000 fishermen have been trained under these schemes from 2017 to 2020. Freshwater fishing consists of 55% of total fish production.

According to the Ministry of Fisheries, Animal Husbandry, Dairying, fish production increased from 7.52 lakh tonnes in years 1950–51 to 125.90 lakh tonnes in years 2018–19, a 17 times increase. Each year, India celebrates 10, July as the National Fish Farmers day. Koyilandy harbour in Kerala is the largest fishing harbour in Asia. It has the longest breakwater.

India has 7,516 kilometres (4,670 mi) of marine coastline, 3,827 fishing villages and 1,914 traditional fish landing centers. India's fresh water resources consist of 195,210 kilometres (121,300 mi) of rivers and canals, 2.9 million hectares of minor and major reservoirs, 2.4 million hectares of ponds and lakes, and about 0.8 million hectares of flood plain wetlands and water bodies. As of 2010, the marine and freshwater resources offered a combined sustainable catch fishing potential of over 4 million metric tonnes of fish. In addition, India's water and natural resources offer a tenfold growth potential in aquaculture (farm fishing) from 2010 harvest levels of 3.9 million metric tonnes of fish, if India were to adopt fishing knowledge, regulatory reforms and sustainability policies.

== History ==
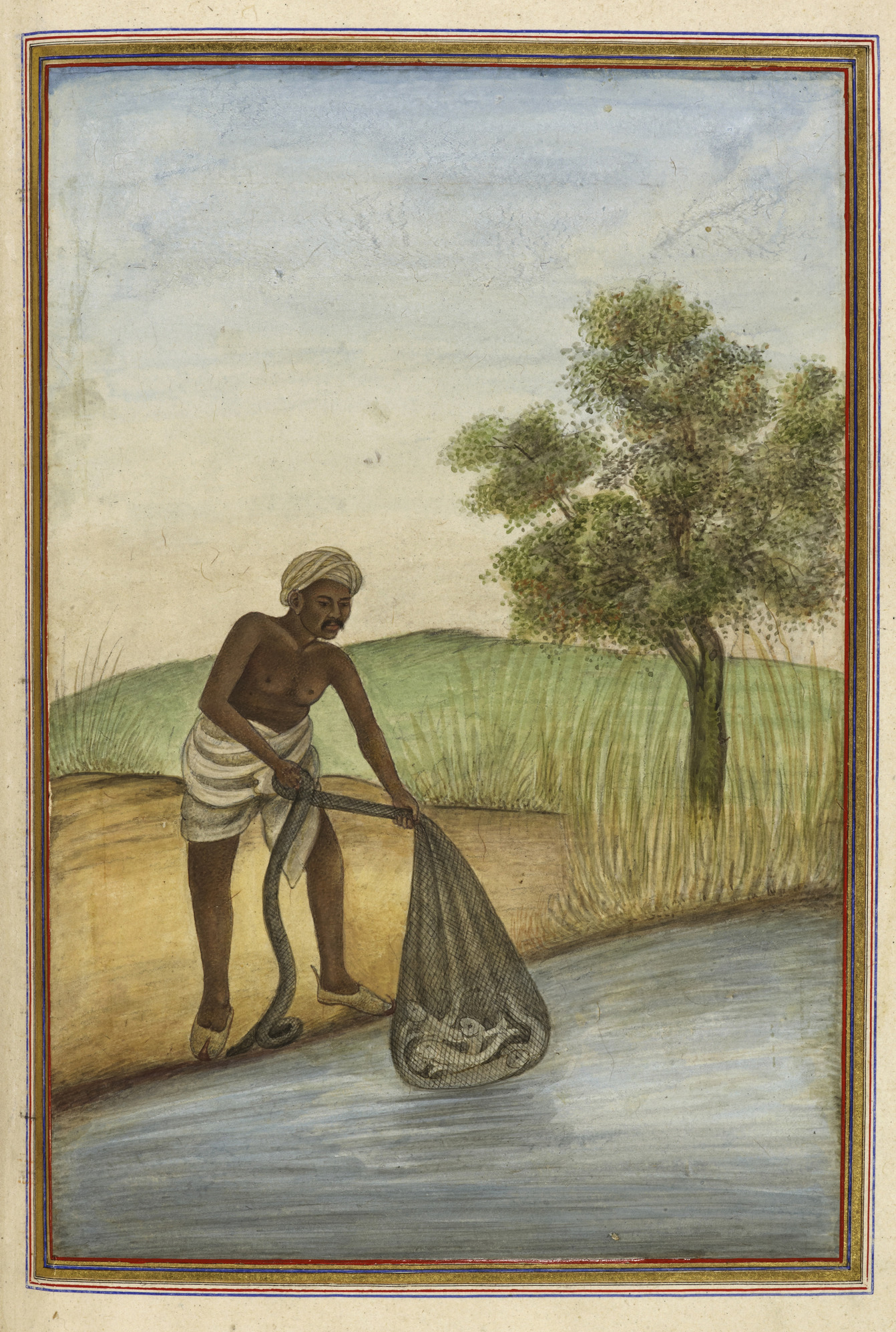
Macchi, a traditional Muslim caste of fishermen - Tashrih al-aqvam (1825)

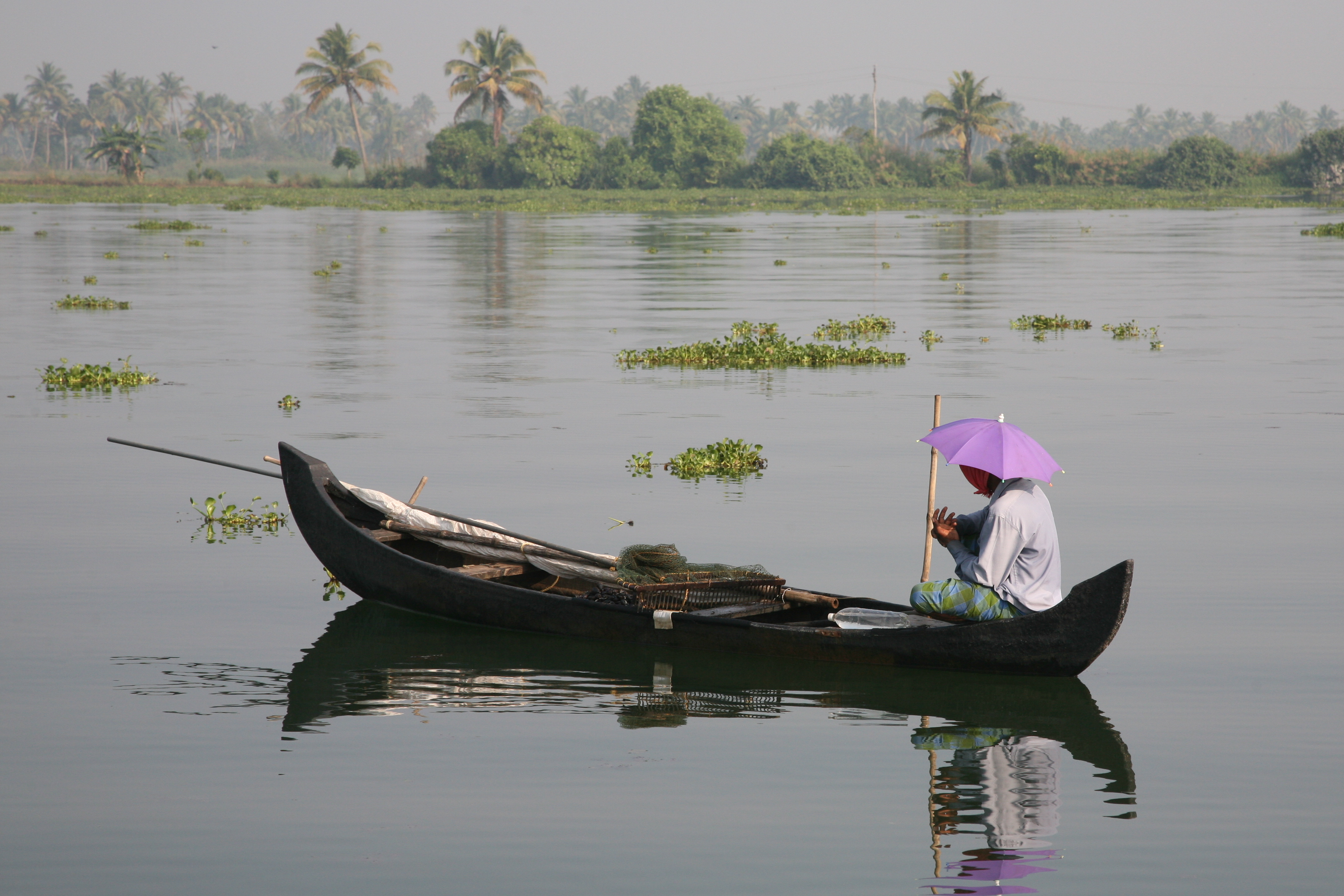
A fisherman in the backwaters of Kerala

Historical texts like Kautilya's Arthashastra (321–300 B.C.) and King Someswara's Manasollasa (1127 A.D.) refer to fish culture. For centuries, India has had a traditional practice of fish culture in small ponds. Significant advances in productivity were made in the early nineteenth century with the controlled breeding of carp in tanks where river conditions are simulated. Brackishwater farming was done on an old system where man-made impediments in coastal wetlands and salt resistant deep water paddy fields. Moreover, traditional fishing methods have been in practise in central and south India for 2000 years.

== Economic benefits ==
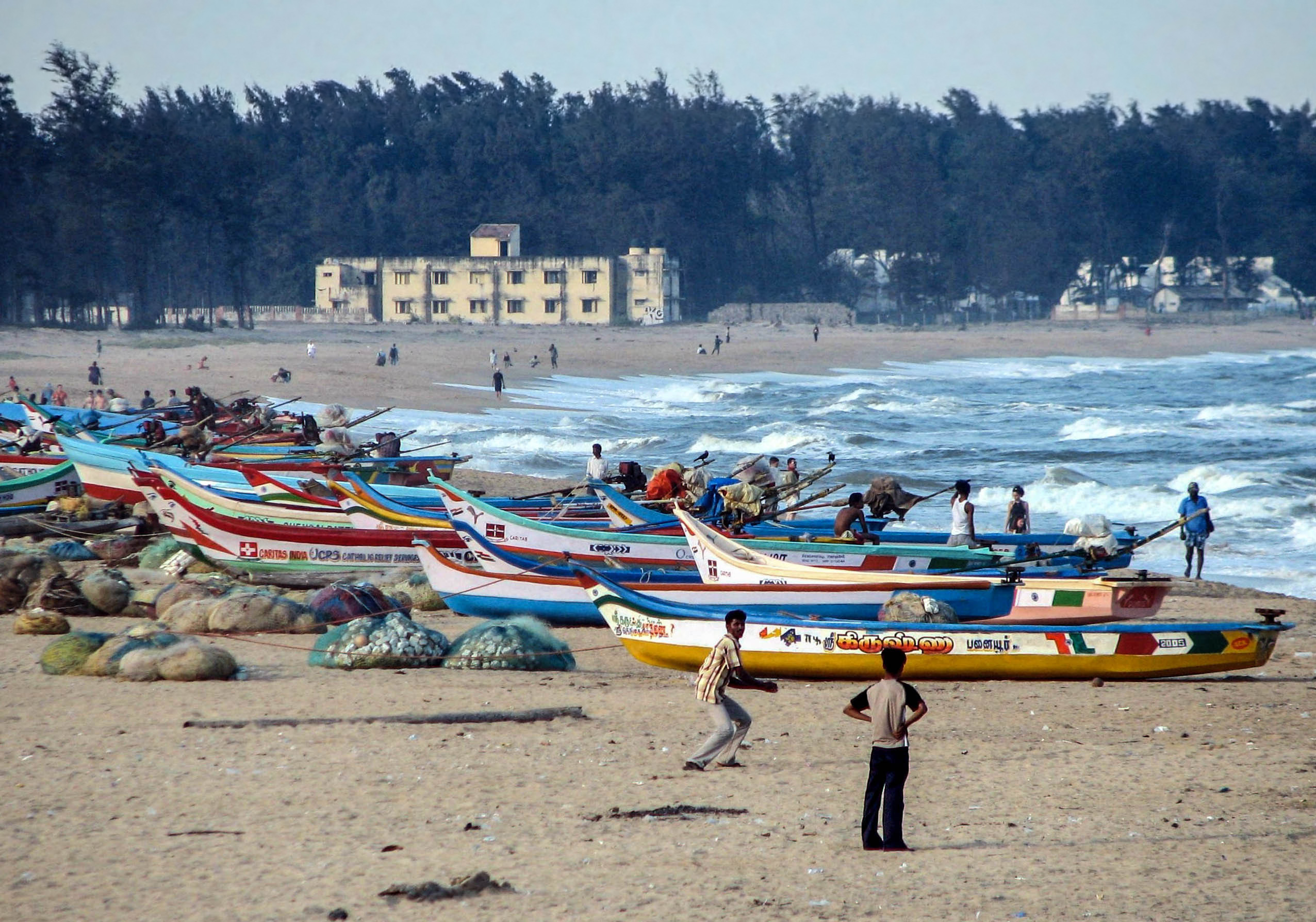
Fish boats in Tamil Nadu

Fishing in India contributed over 1% of India's annual gross domestic product in 2008. Fishing in India employs about 14.5 million people. To harvest the economic benefits from fishing, India has adopted exclusive economic zone, stretching 200 nautical miles (370 km) into the Indian Ocean, encompasses more than 2 million square kilometers. In addition to this marine zone, India has about 14,000 km^{2} of brackish water available for aquaculture, about 16,000 km^{2} of freshwater lakes, ponds, and swamps; and nearly 64,000 kilometers of rivers and streams. In 1990, there were 1.7 million full-time fishermen, 1.3 million part-time fishermen, and 2.3 million occasional fishermen, many of whom worked as saltmakers, ferrymen, seamen, or operated boats for hire. In the early 1990s, the fishing fleet consisted of 180,000 traditional craft powered by sails or oars, 26,000 motorized traditional craft, and some 34,000 mechanized boats.

Fish production rose from 800,000 tons in FY 1950 to 4.1 million tons in the early 1990s. From 1990 through 2010, Indian fish industry accelerated, reaching a total marine and freshwater fish production to about 8 million metric tons. In 2006, Indian central government initiated a dedicated organization focused on fisheries, under its Ministry of Agriculture. Special efforts have been made to promote extensive and intensive inland fish farming, modernize coastal fisheries, and encourage deep-sea fishing through joint ventures. These efforts led to a more than fourfold increase in coastal fish production from 520,000 tons in FY 1950 to 3.35 million tons in FY 2013. The increase in inland fish production was even more dramatic, increasing almost eightfold from 218,000 tons in FY 1950 to 6.10 million tons in FY 2013. The value of fish and processed fish exports increased from less than 1 percent of the total value of exports in FY 1960 to 3.6 percent in FY 1993. Between 1990 and 2007, fish production in India has grown at a higher rate than food grains, milk, eggs, and other food items. Indian inland waters (rivers, reservoirs, wetlands, lakes and ponds) contribute 62–65% of the total fisheries production.

== Law and regulations ==
National laws include the British-era Indian Fisheries Act, 1897, which penalizes the killing of fish by poisoning water and by using explosives; the Environment Protection Act, 1986, being an umbrella act containing provisions for all environment related issues affecting fisheries and aquaculture industry in India, the Water (Prevention and Control of Pollution) Act, 1974 and the Wildlife Protection Act, 1972. The Wildlife Protection Act, 1972 prevents the fishing of rare species of fishes. In 1996, the Indian Supreme Court prohibited the setting up of Shrimp farm ponds except traditional and improved traditional types of ponds on the Coastal Regulation Zone and on the Chilka Lake and Pulicat Lake. The Order No 722 (E) of 2002 prohibited the use of certain antibiotics and pharmacologically active substances in hatcheries of production of the juveniles and larvae, or in manufacturing the fish feed or in processing fish products. In 2017, the Indian government banned selling of 158 fish species of ornamental fishes and also made it mandatory that a full-time fishery expert be present in the Ornamental fish farm for inspecting the health of the fishes. Regulations regarding the tank size, stocking density of fish and volume of water were also introduced.

In India, annually fishing is officially banned for 47 days (shortened from 61 days prior to 2020) during first two months of monsoon season for the breeding and spawning of the fishes. During this time mechanised fishing vessels like trawlers are banned from fishing

In 2019, a separate ministry named the Ministry of Animal Husbandry, Dairying and Fisheries was formed.

== Research and training ==
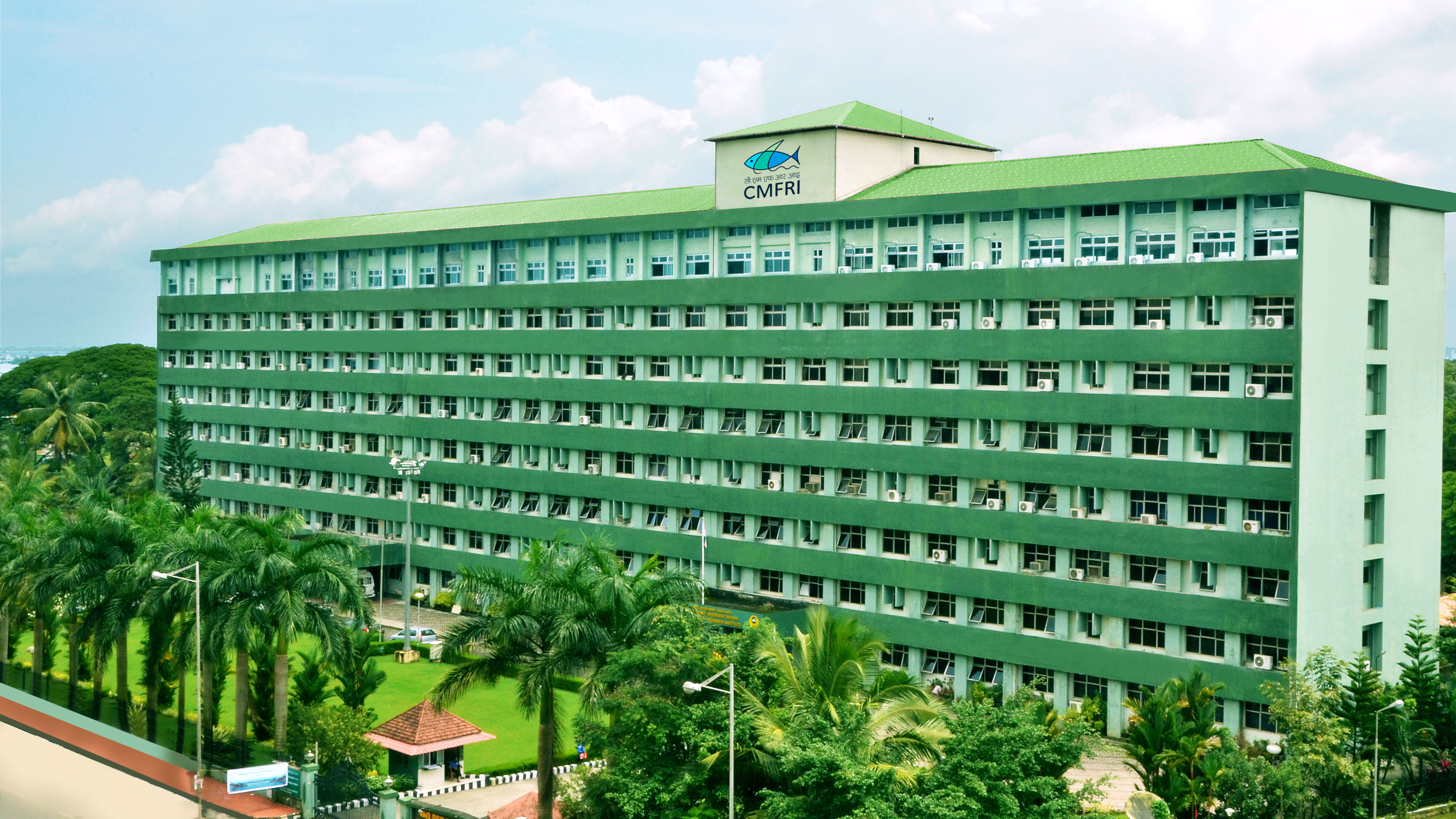
Central Marine Fisheries Research Institute in Kochi

Fisheries research and training institutions in India are supported by central and state governments. The major fisheries research institutions operating under the Indian Council of Agricultural Research are

- Fishery Survey of India,
- Central Marine Fisheries Research Institute at Kochi
- Central Institute of Fisheries Education at Mumbai,
- Central Inland Fisheries Research Institute at Barrackpore in West Bengal,
- Central Fisheries Corporation at Kolkata, the Central Institute of Coastal Engineering for Fisheries at Bangalore, and
- Central Institute of Fisheries Technology at Kochi in Kerala.

Fishery training is provided by the Central Institute of Fisheries Education in Mumbai, which has ancillary institutions at Barrackpore in Uttar Pradesh and Hyderabad in Telangana.

The Government of India established the National Fisheries Development Board in 2006 with its headquarters in Hyderabad. The NFDB works from a four-story tin-clad building shaped like a fish; built in 2012 and reportedly based on a 1992 sculpture by Frank Gehry in Barcelona, the building is considered an example of mimetic architecture.

The Central Institute of Fisheries Nautical and Engineering Training with facilities in Chennai, Kochi and Vishakapatnam trains operators of deep-sea fishing vessels and technicians for shore establishments. Fisheries Institute of Technology and Training (FITT) was established in Chennai in collaboration Tata Group to improve the socioeconomic condition of fishermen. The Integrated Fisheries Project was established to research on processing, popularizing and marketing of unusual fish. At present there are 19 Fisheries colleges run by state Governments.

== Issues ==
Despite rapid growth in total fish production, an individual fish farmers’ average annual production in India is only 2 tonnes, compared to 172 tonnes in Norway, 72 tonnes in Chile, and 6 tonnes per fisherman in China. In India, fishing and selling of critically endangered fish species are banned. But sometimes, due to a lack of awareness drives from fisheries department officials, critically endangered species are killed. The annual fishing (trawling) ban is done during the monsoon season for breeding and spawning of fish species. But some fish species like Cuttlefish and squid breed and spawn during October. So there have been suggestions to increase the trawling ban to 90 days.

Indian fishermen sometimes get captured by the navies of Sri Lanka and Pakistan. Skirmishes with the Sri Lankan navy often result in casualties and damage of boats. As of 2014, out of the 281 Indian prisoners in Pakistan jails 232 are Indian fishermen. In 2013, an Indian fisherman died in Pakistan jail. In 2014, another Indian fisherman died in Pakistan jail. In 2020 the Pakistan Marines fired on two Indian boats near the international maritime boundary line (IMBL) in an incident in which one fisherman was injured.

There has been an increase in the number of Chinese deap-sea fishing trawlers in the Southern Indian Ocean which has caused concerns in India. Between 2015 and 2019, around 500 Chinese trawlers were sighted in the region

Climate change along with habitat destruction and other anthropogenic environmental damages have reduced fish stocks within India's exclusive economic zone, leading some fishers to take riskier trips into international waters.

== Aquaculture ==
=== Carp ===
Carp farming in the country started between 1970 and 1980 due to the demonstrated high production levels of 8 to 10 tonnes/hectare/year in an incubation center. Late 1980s saw the dawn of aquaculture in India and transformed fish culture into a more modern enterprise. With the economic liberalization of the early 1990s, fishing industry got a major investment boost.

India's breeding and culture technologies include primarily different species of carp, including the important Indian major carp species (notably catla, mrigal and rohu); other species such as catfish, murrel and prawns are recent additions. The culture systems adopted in the country vary greatly depending on the input available in any particular region as well as on the investment capabilities of the farmer. While extensive aquaculture is carried out in comparatively large water bodies with stocking of the fish seed as the only input beyond utilising natural productivity, elements of fertilisation and feeding have been introduced into semi-intensive culture. The different culture systems in Indian practice include:

- Intensive pond culture with supplementary feeding and aeration (10–15 tonnes/ha/yr)
- Composite carp culture (4–6 tonnes/ha/yr)
- Weed-based carp polyculture (3–4 tonnes/ha/yr)
- Integrated fish farming with poultry, pigs, ducks, horticulture, etc. (3–5 tonnes/ha/yr)
- Pen culture (3–5 tonnes/ha/yr)
- Cage culture (10–15 kg/m^{2}/yr)
- Running-water fish culture (20–50 kg/m^{2}/yr)

=== Prawn or shrimp ===
Freshwater prawn farming in India has grown rapidly since 2000 with Andhra Pradesh and Kerala contributing to approximately 60 percent of the total water area dedicated to prawn farming, followed by West Bengal. In fiscal 2016, India became the biggest exporter of shrimps by overtaking Vietnam. Frozen shrimp is the top item of export among seafood, accounting for 38.28 per cent in quantity and 64.50 per cent of the total earnings in dollar terms in 2016–17. The overall export of shrimp during 2016-17 was pegged at 434,484 MT, worth US$3.726 billion. USA was the largest import market for frozen shrimp (165,827 MT), followed by the European Union (EU) (77,178 MT), South East Asia (1,05,763 MT), Japan (31,284 MT), Middle East (19,554 MT), China (7,818 MT) and other countries (27,063 MT). Shrimp exports from India are expected to nearly double to US$7 billion by 2022, driven by strong demand, high quality, improved product mix, and an increase in aquaculture area in Andhra Pradesh, Kerala, Gujarat, Odisha and West Bengal.

The giant tiger prawn (Penaeus monodon) is the dominant species chosen for aquaculture, followed by the Indian white prawn (Fenneropenaeus indicus) and Pacific white shrimp (Litopenaeus vannamei). In 2015–16, West Bengal (61,998 MT) was the largest producer of tiger shrimp for export, followed by Odisha (9,191 MT). Andhra Pradesh (295,332 MT) was the largest producer of Pacific white shrimp.

=== Freshwater aquaculture ===
Freshwater aquaculture accounts for nearly 55% of the total fish production in India and Second Largest Producer of Inland fish in the world. Aquaculture resources in India include 2.36 million hectares of ponds and tanks, 1.07 million hectares of beels, jheels and derelict waters plus in addition 0.12 million kilometers of canals, 3.15 million hectares of reservoirs and 0.72 million hectares of upland lakes that could be utilised for aquaculture purposes. Ponds and tanks are the prime resources for freshwater aquaculture in India. However, less than 10 percent of India's natural potential is used for aquaculture currently. For bringing more areas under scientific fisheries and aquaculture, the Indian government and premier fisheries research institutes are trying hard to sensitize the fish farmers and entrepreneurs regarding the package of practices and prospects of the highly promising ‘culture-based fisheries technology (CBF)’ in inland waters. Utilization of untapped inland waters through CBF is one of the foremost strategies for achieving blue revolution. CBF is generally practiced in inland waters having areas between 100 and 1000 ha (lakes, wetlands and small reservoirs) and cautiously in 1000–5000 ha (medium-sized reservoirs)

=== Brackishwater aquaculture ===
The FAO of the United Nations estimates that about 1.2 million hectares of potential brackishwater area available in India is suitable for farming, in addition to this, around 8.5 million hectares of salt affected areas are also available, of which about 2.6 million hectares could be exclusively utilised for aquaculture due to the unsuitability of these resources for other agriculture based activities. However, just like India's fresh water resources, the total brackishwater area under cultivation is only just over 13 percent of the potential water area available. Carp hatcheries in both the public and private sectors have contributed towards the increase in seed production from 6321 million fry in 1985–1986 to over 18500 million fry in 2007. There are 35 freshwater prawn hatcheries in the coastal states producing over 200 million seed per annum. Furthermore, the 237 shrimp hatcheries with a production capacity of approximately 11.425 billion post larvae per year are meeting the seed requirement of the brackish water shrimp farming sector.

=== Ornamental fish ===
India's domestic ornamental fish Industry is 300 crore rupees worth. In 2017, India exported ornamental fish worth Rs 9.5 crore, a 40% increase from the previous year.

=== Seaweed ===
Karnataka is the largest producer of seaweed in India, producing 22 thousand tonnes, followed by Gujarat, Maharashtra and Lakshadweep. The red seaweed is the most cultivated variety of seaweed in India. In 2018 the Indian government set up 10,000 seaweeds culture units in Andhra Pradesh under the Central government's Blue Revolution scheme.

== Distribution ==
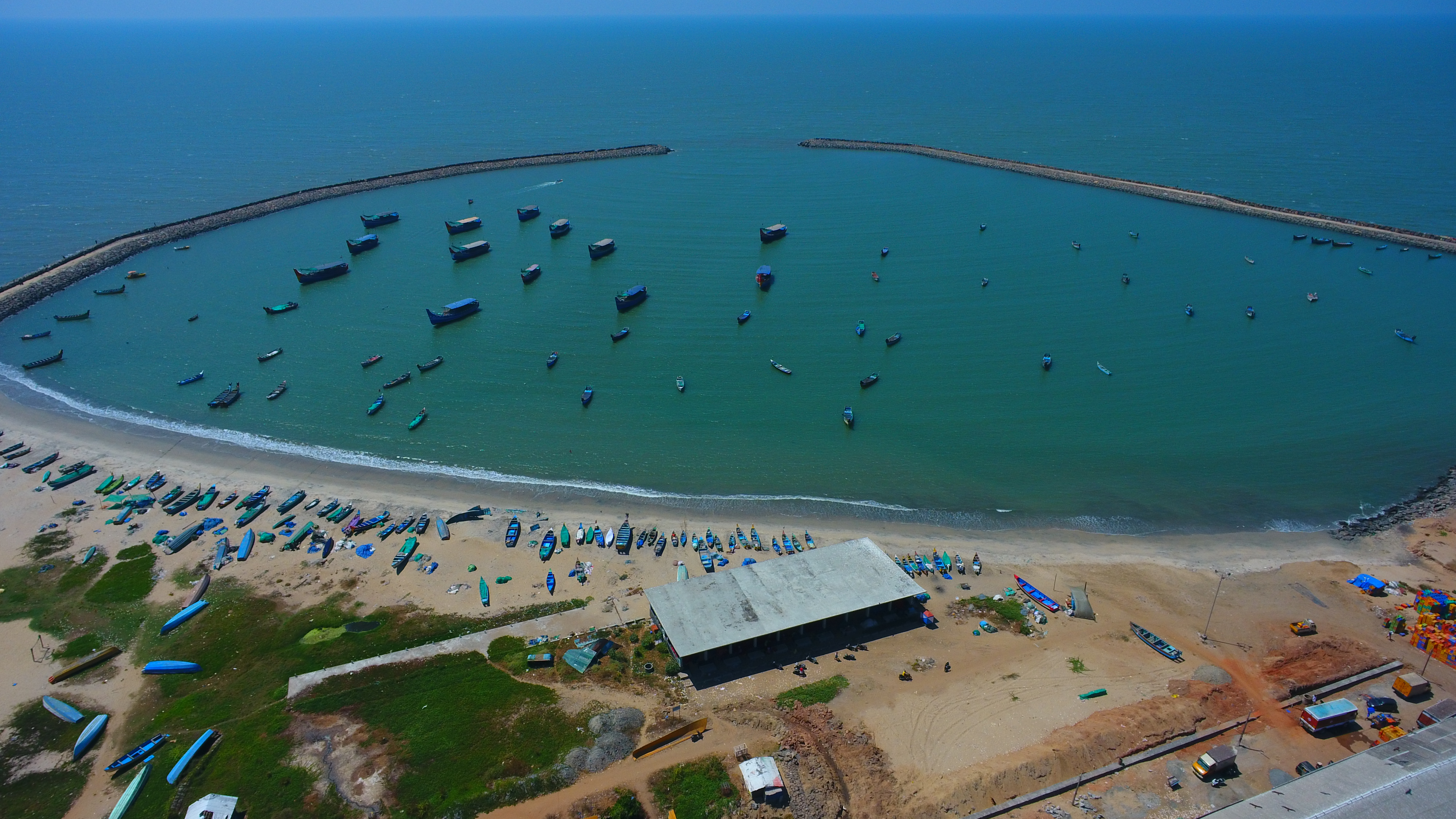
Vellayil Fishing Harbour

There are ten main fishing harbors at:

- Mangalore in Karnataka,
- Chellanam, Vypeen, Koyilandy, Neendakara, Vizhinjam in Kerala,
- Tuticorin, Nagapattinam, Chennai in Tamil Nadu,
- Vishakhapatnam in Andhra Pradesh, and
- Raichak in West Bengal
- Paradip in Odisha

23 minor fishing harbours and 95 fish-landing centres are designated to provide landing and berthing facilities to fishing craft.

Leading fish producing states in India, 2019–2020
Rank	State	Total production (lakh metric tonnes)
1	Andhra Pradesh	34.5
2	West Bengal	17.42
3	Gujarat	8.34
4	Odisha	6.85
5	Tamil Nadu	6.82

=== Top ten states fish production every year ===
States	2013-14			2014-15			2015-16			2016-17			2017-18		
States	Inland	Marine	Total	Inland	Marine	Total	Inland	Marine	Total	Inland	Marine	Total	Inland	Marine	Total
Andhra Pradesh	15.8	4.38	20.18	15.03	4.75	19.79	18.32	5.2	23.52	21.86	5.8	27.66	28.45	6.05	34.5
West Bengal	13.92	1.88	15.81	14.38	1.79	16.17	14.93	1.78	16.71	15.25	1.77	17.02	15.57	1.85	17.42
Gujarat	0.98	6.96	7.93	1.11	6.98	8.1	1.12	6.97	8.1	1.17	6.99	8.16	3.34	12.11	15.45
Kerala	1.94	3.2	4.14	1.36	3.33	4.7	1.77	4.45	5.21	5.55	5.53	10.08	5.35	10.00	15.35
Tamil Nadu	1.92	4.32	6.24	2.4	4.57	6.98	2.43	4.67	7.09	1.97	4.72	6.69	1.85	6.97	8.82
Uttar Pradesh	4.64	0	4.64	4.94	0	4.94	5.05	0	5.05	6.18	0	6.18	6.29	0	6.29
Maharashtra	1.35	4.67	6.03	1.44	4.64	6.08	1.46	4.34	5.8	2	4.63	6.63	1.31	4.75	6.06
Odisha	1.98	3.57	5.55	2.23	4	6.23	1.69	4.12	5.81	1.59	3.99	5.57	1.88	4.14	6.03
Bihar	4.32	0	4.32	4.8	0	4.8	5.07	0	5.07	5.09	0	5.09	5.88	0	5.88
Karnataka	1.86	5.22	7.09	2.02	5.24	7.26	2.11	5.17	7.28	1.61	4.31	5.93	1.48	4.14	5.63
India	61.36	34.43	95.79	66.91	35.69	102.6	71.62	36	107.62	78.06	36.25	114.31	89.02	36.88	125.9

== See also ==
- Forestry in India
- Borders of India
- Coastal India
- Exclusive economic zone of India
- Outline of India
