= Remunerative Approach for Agriculture and Allied sector Rejuvenation =

Government of India scheme

- Country: India
- Prime Minister(s): Manmohan Singh
- Launched: August 2007
- Closed: 2012 Restarted By Manmohan Singh government Renamed as - Remunerative Approach for Agriculture and Allied sector Rejuvenation
- Status: Closed
- Website: Official website

Remunerative Approach for Agriculture and Allied sector Rejuvenation, previously Rashtriya Krishi Vikas Yojana (Hindi: राष्ट्रीय कृषि विकास योजना, lit. 'National Agriculture Development Programme') is a State Plan Scheme of Additional Central Assistance, was launched in August 2007 as a part of the 11th Five Year Plan by the Government of India. Launched under the aegis of the National Development Council, it seeks to achieve 4% annual growth in agriculture through development of Agriculture and its allied sectors (as defined by the Planning Commission) during the period under the 11th Five Year Plan (2007–11).

== Aims ==
This programme is essentially a State Plan Scheme that seeks to provide the States and Territories of India with the autonomy to draw up plans for increased public investment in Agriculture by incorporating information on local requirements, geographical/climatic conditions, available natural resources/ technology and cropping patterns in their districts so as to significantly increase the productivity of Agriculture and its allied sectors and eventually maximize the returns of farmers in agriculture and its allied sectors.

== Eligibility ==
A State is eligible for funding under the RKVY if it maintains or increases the percentage of its expenditure on Agriculture and its Allied Sectors with respect to the total State Plan Expenditure, where the Base Line (which will move every year) for this expenditure is the average of the percentage of expenditure incurred by a State Government for the previous three years on Agriculture and its Allied Sectors minus any funds related to Agriculture and its allied sectors that it may already have received in that time under its State Plan.

Consider the following hypothetical situation where a State seeks eligibility under the RKVY for the year 2010-11.

Year	Expenditure on Agriculture and Allied Sectors(minus funds received under RKVY) (in Rs. Crore)	Total Outlay under State Plan (in Rs. Crore)	Percentage
2007-08	200	2000	10%
2008-09	150	2000	7.5%
2009-10	175	2250	7.7%
2010-11	198	2200	9%

To be eligible for funding under the RKVY for the year 2010-11, the State must have a percentage of expenditure higher than the average of years 2007-08,08-09 and 09-10 $8.4\% = \tfrac {10\% + 7.5\% + 7.7\%}{3}$.

As the percentage of expenditure in 2010-11 is higher than the baseline percentage by 0.6%, the State is eligible for allocation of funds under the RKVY.

If the expenditure in subsequent years falls below the base line, the resources required to complete projects started under the RKVY will now have to be provided by the State Government.

== Funding ==
It was decided that ₹58.75 billion (US$610 million) would be released by the Central Government every year under the 11th Five Year Plan and ₹15 billion (US$160 million) would be allocated in 2007-08. During the first three years (2007–2010) of the implementation of the RKVY, an amount of ₹84,621 million (US$880 million), which is roughly 33% of the total allocation under the RKVY of ₹250 billion (US$2.6 billion).

While presenting the Union Budget Of India, India's Finance Minister Pranab Mukherjee stated that the allocation under the RKVY had been increased from the existing ₹67.55 billion (US$700 million) in 2010-11 to ₹78.6 billion (US$820 million) for the year 2011-12.

Status of release during 2016-17

Name of State	Amount (Rs. in Crore) and Release Date	Data as on 24 August 2016
Andhra Pradesh	Rs.111.89 (19.08.2016)	Data as on 24 August 2016
Chhattisgarh	Rs.90.06 (23.05.2016)	Data as on 24 August 2016
Jammu & Kashmir	Rs.16.16 (19.08.2016)	Data as on 24 August 2016
Karnataka	Rs.202.93 (28.07.2016)	Data as on 24 August 2016
Madhya Pradesh	Rs.155.13 (23.05.2016)	Data as on 24 August 2016
Maharahstra	Rs.200.24 (24.05.2016)	Data as on 24 August 2016
Manipur	Rs.11.86 (15.07.2016)	Data as on 24 August 2016
Nagaland	Rs.14.86 (19.08.2016)	Data as on 24 August 2016
Odisha	Rs.45.86 (23.05.2016)	Data as on 24 August 2016
Rajasthan	Rs.198.71 (14.07.2016)	Data as on 24 August 2016
Tamil Nadu	Rs.152.87 (24.05.2016)	Data as on 24 August 2016
Uttarakhand	Rs.23.56 (15.07.2016)	Data as on 24 August 2016

== Performance ==
In a press release by the Press Information Bureau dated 24 March 2011, a number of Indian states reported a significantly large increase in agricultural outlay as given below:

S. No.	State	Total increase in Agricultural Outlay
1	Chhattisgarh	892%
2	Orissa	730%
3	Maharashtra	605%
4	Tripura	425%
5	Bihar	423%

== Additions ==
On 17 June 2010, the Government of India announced that it would include Sericulture and Allied activities to boost production of high quality silk and contribute to the global market in a larger way to combat the declining trend of Sericulture productivity.

The Saffron Mission in J&K was launched in 2010-11 with an outlay of ₹3.72 billion (US$39 million) as an additional scheme under the RKVY.

== See also ==
- Ministry of Agriculture (India)
