= Irrigation in India =

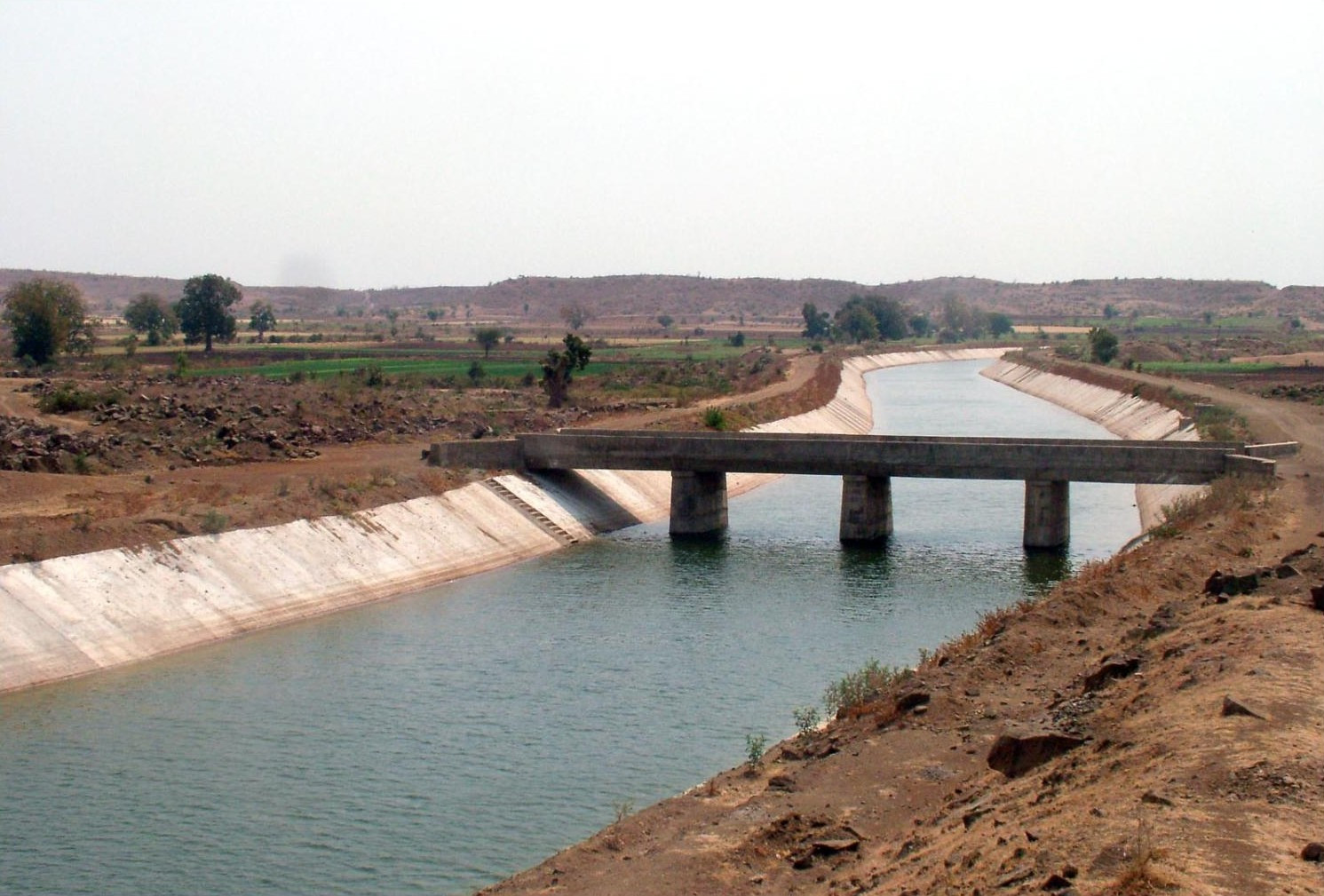
An irrigation canal in Gujarat. Irrigation contributes significantly to the agriculture in India.

Irrigation in India includes a network of major and minor canals from Indian rivers, groundwater well based systems, tanks, and other rainwater harvesting projects for agricultural activities. Of these, the groundwater system is the largest. In 2013–14, only about 36.7% of total agricultural land in India was reliably irrigated, and the remaining 2/3 of cultivated land in India was dependent on monsoons. 65% of the irrigation in India is from groundwater. Currently about 51% of the agricultural area cultivating food grains is covered by irrigation. The rest of the area is dependent on rainfall which is usually unreliable and unpredictable.

The Indian government launched a demand side water management plan costing ₹6000 crore or USD854 million across 8,350 water stressed villages of 78 districts in seven states – Gujarat, Haryana, Karnataka, Madhya Pradesh, Maharashtra, Rajasthan and Uttar Pradesh – over five years from 2021–22 to 2026–27, with the view to harvest rainwater, enhance the water table, and enhance the water recharge rate with village panchayat level water management plans. Most of the canal irrigation is in the canal network of Ganges-Yamuna basin mainly in the states of Punjab, Haryana, and Uttar Pradesh and somewhat in Rajasthan and Bihar, while small local canal networks also exist in the south in Tamil Nadu, Karnataka, and Kerala. The largest canal in India is Indira Gandhi Canal, which is about 650 km (400 mi) long. India has an ambitious river linking national project to enhance the coverage of canal irrigation, reduce floods and water shortage.

Irrigation in India helps improve food security, reduces dependence on monsoons, improves agricultural productivity and creates rural job opportunities. Dams used for irrigation projects help produce electricity and transport facilities, as well as provide drinking water supplies to a growing population, control floods and prevent droughts.

== History ==
=== Ancient India (Prachina Bharat) ===
The earliest mentions of irrigation are found in Rigveda chapters 1.55, 1.85, 1.105, 7.9, 8.69 and 10.101. The Veda mentions only well-style irrigation, where kupa and avata wells once dug are stated to be always full of water, from which varatra (rope strap) and cakra (wheel) pull kosa (pails) of water. This water was, state the Vedas, led into surmi susira (broad channels) and from there into khanitrima (diverting channels) into fields.

Later, the 4th-century BCE Indian scholar Pāṇini, mentions tapping several rivers for irrigation. The mentioned rivers include Sindhu, Suvastu, Varnu, Sarayu, Vipas and Chandrabhaga. Buddhist texts from the 3rd century BCE also mention irrigation of crops. Texts from the Maurya Empire era (3rd century BCE) mention that the state raised revenue from charging farmers for irrigation services from rivers.

Patanjali, in Yogasutra of about the 4th century CE, explains a technique of yoga by comparing it to "the way a farmer diverts a stream from an irrigation canal for irrigation". In Tamil Nadu, the Grand Anicut (canal) across the Kaveri river was implemented in the 3rd century CE, and the basic design is still used today.

=== Medieval era ===
The most widespread irrigation system in India was undertaken in India in the medieval period by the Sultanate rulers. Firoz Shah Tughlaq (1309–1388) built the most extensive canal irrigation system around the Indo-Gangetic doab and the region west of the river Yamuna in the fourteenth century. These canals provided vast resources of water to agricultural lands in northern India as well as vital supplies of water to urban and rural settlements. These irrigation projects were continued by the subsequent rulers of northern India, particularly the Mughal rulers till the early eighteenth century. The British built the colonial canal networks on these medieval canal systems.

=== Colonial era ===
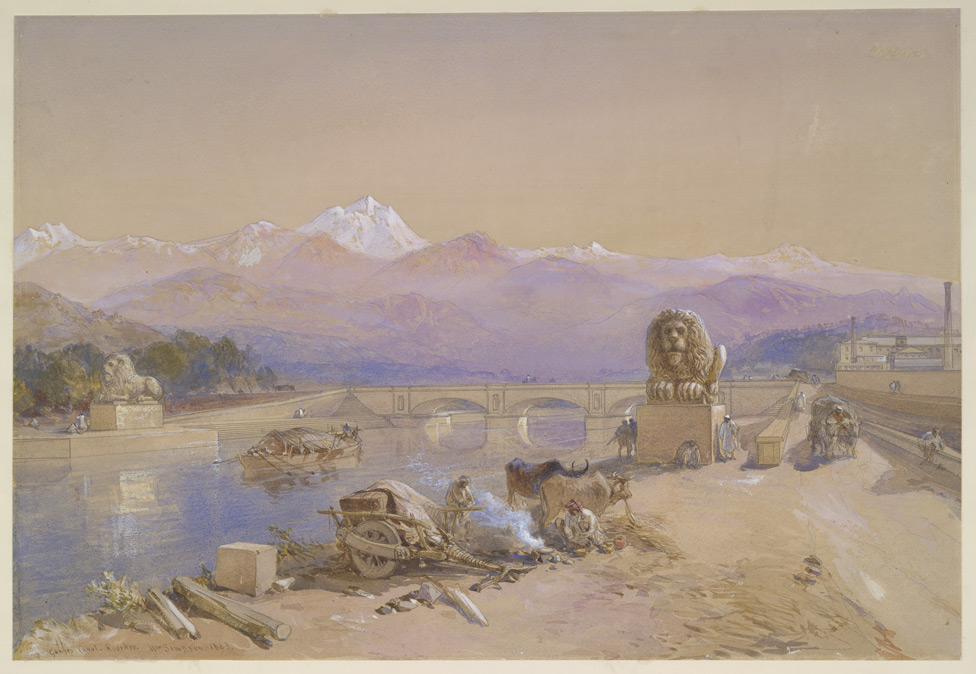
Ganges irrigation canal built during the colonial era, and inaugurated in 1854

In 1800, some 800,000 hectares were irrigated in India. The Britishers by 1940 built significant number of canals and irrigation systems in Uttar Pradesh, Bihar, Punjab, Assam and Odisha. The Ganges Canal reached 350 miles from Haridwar to Kanpur in Uttar Pradesh. In Assam, a jungle in 1840, by 1900 had 1.62m hectares under cultivation, especially in tea plantations. In all, the amount of irrigated land multiplied by a factor of eight. Historian David Gilmour states British colonial government had built irrigation network with Ganges canal and that, "by the end of the century the new network of canals in the Punjab" were in place.

Much of the increase in irrigation during British colonial era was targeted at dedicated poppy and opium farms in India, for exports to China. Poppy cultivation by the British Raj required reliable, dedicated irrigation system. Large portions of the eastern and northern regions of India, namely United Provinces, Northwestern Provinces, Oudh, Behar, Bengal and Rewa were irrigated to ensure reliable supply of poppy and opium for China. By 1850, the Asian opium trade created nearly 1,000 square kilometers of poppy farms in India in its fertile Ganges plains, which increased to over 200.000 hectares by 1900. This diversion of food crop land to cash crop use, state scholars, led to massive famines over the 1850 to 1905 period.

Major irrigation canals were built after millions of people died each in a series of major famines in the 19th century in British India. In 1900, British India (including Bangladesh and Pakistan) had about 13 million ha under irrigation. In 1901 the Viceroy, Lord Curzon, appointed a commission chaired by Sir Colin Scott-Moncrieff to draw up a comprehensive irrigation plan for India. In 1903 the commission's report recommended irrigation of an additional 2.6 million hectares. By 1947, the irrigated area had increased to about 22 million ha. In Northwestern British India region alone, with the colonial government's effort, 2.2 million hectares of previously barren land was irrigated by the 1940s, most of which is now part of Pakistan. Arthur Cotton led some irrigation canal projects in the Deccan peninsula, and landmarks are named after him in Andhra Pradesh and Tamil Nadu. However, much of the added irrigation capacity during the colonial era was provided by groundwater wells and tanks, operated manually.

== Irrigation trends since 1947 ==
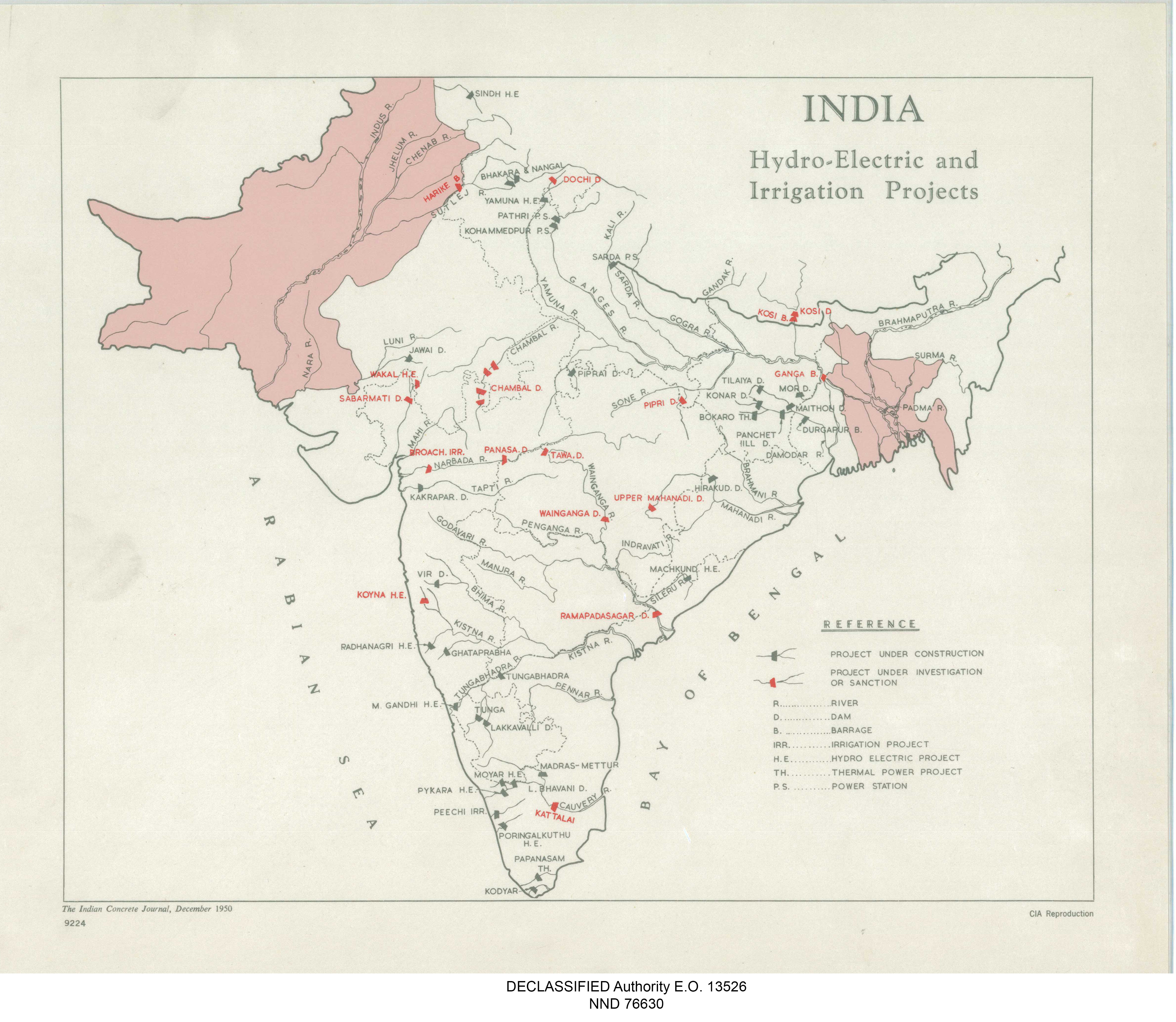
Hydroelectric/Irrigation projects in India, 1950

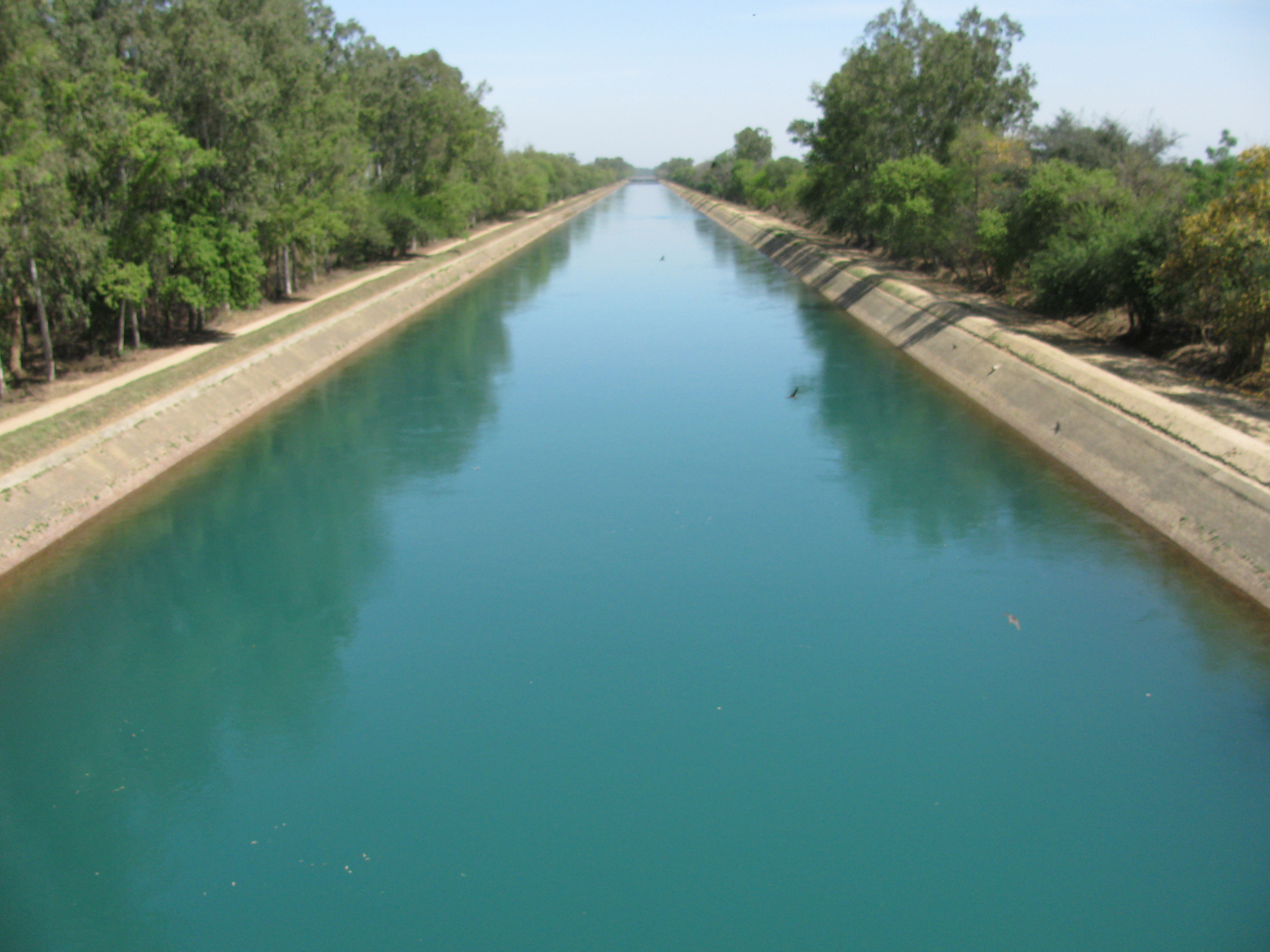
One of the sections of Bhakra Canal system in north India. This canal network irrigates over 4 million hectares of land.

India's irrigation covered crop area was about 22.6 million hectares in 1951, and it increased to a potential of 90 mha at the end of 1995, inclusive of canals and groundwater wells. However, the potential irrigation relies on reliable supply of electricity for water pumps and maintenance, and the net irrigated land has been considerably short. According to 2001/2002 Agriculture census, only 58.13 million hectares of land was actually irrigated in India. The total arable land in India is 160 million hectares (395 million acres). According to the World Bank, only about 35% of total agricultural land in India was reliably irrigated in 2010.

The ultimate sustainable irrigation potential of India has been estimated in 1991 United Nations' FAO report to be 139.5 million hectares, comprising 58.5 mha from major and medium river-fed irrigation canal schemes, 15 mha from minor irrigation canal schemes, and 66 mha from groundwater well fed irrigation.

India's irrigation is mostly groundwater well based. At 39 million hectares (67% of its total irrigation), India has the world's largest groundwater well equipped irrigation system (China with 19 mha is second, USA with 17 mha is third).

India has spent ₹ 16,590 crore on irrigation development between 1950 and 1985. Between 2000–2005 and 2005–2010, India proposed to invest a sum of ₹ 1,03,315 crore (INR) and ₹ 2,10,326 crore (INR) on irrigation and flood control in India.

== State-wise irrigation data ==
Tables below provide the fraction of agricultural area irrigated by state, the agricultural yield per hectare, and the proportion of different irrigation technologies employed.

=== Statewise irrigation coverage and productivity ===
State	Agricultural production (million tonnes)	Percentage of total production	Productivity (tonnes per hectare)	Percent of cultivated area under irrigation
Punjab	27.3	11.6	4.2	98.1
Haryana	15.6	6.6	3.3	87.6
Andhra Pradesh	20.4	8.7	2.7	63.9
Bihar	12.2	5.2	1.7	63.4
Tamil Nadu	7.1	3.0	2.2	63.1
West Bengal	16.3	6.9	2.4	48.2
Gujarat	6.4	2.7	1.5	44.7
Madhya Pradesh	13.9	5.9	1.1	44.5
Uttarakhand	1.7	6.7	1.7	42.9
Orissa	7.4	3.1	1.3	33.6
Karnataka	11.2	4.8	1.5	28.5
Chhattisgarh	5.1	2.2	1.0	27.6
Rajasthan	16.6	7.1	1.2	26.4
Maharashtra	11.4	4.8	1.0	16.8
Jharkhand	1.7	0.7	1.7	5.4
Assam	4.1	1.7	1.5	4.9
Other States	6.3	2.6	NA	NA
All India	234.4	100	1.9	48.3

=== State-wise irrigation types, capacity and actual ===
State	Total crop area (million hectares)	Groundwater irrigation crop area (million hectares)	Canal irrigation crop area (million hectares)	Total crop area actually irrigated (million hectares)
Andhra Pradesh	16.6	2.5	2.7	4.9
Arunachal Pradesh	0.4		0.07	0.05
Assam	3.2	0.13	0.1	0.22
Bihar	6.4	2.2	1.3	3.5
Chhattisgarh	5.1	0.17	0.74	0.85
Goa	0.1		0.1	0.1
Gujarat	9.9	3.1	0.5	3.2
Haryana	3.6	1.99	1.32	3.26
Himachal Pradesh	1.0	0.02	0.09	0.11
Jammu & Kashmir	0.9	0.02	0.38	0.37
Jharkhand	3.2	0.11	0.13	0.24
Karnataka	12.2	1.43	1.33	2.38
Kerala	1.5	0.18	0.21	0.39
Madhya Pradesh	15.8	2.74	1.70	4.19
Maharashtra	19.8	3.12	1.03	3.36
Manipur	0.2		0.05	0.05
Meghalaya	0.3		0.06	0.06
Mizoram	0.1		0.01	0.01
Nagaland	1.1		0.1	0.07
Odisha	4.9	0.17	1.07	1.24
Punjab	4.0	3.06	0.94	3.96
Rajasthan	21.1	3.98	1.52	5.12
Sikkim	0.1		0.01	0.01
Tamil Nadu	6.5	1.61	1.43	2.66
Tripura	0.3	0.02	0.05	0.07
Uttar Pradesh	17.6	10.64	4.21	14.49
Uttarakhand	0.8	0.22	0.14	0.35
West Bengal	5.5	2.09	1.22	2.98
All India	159.6	39.43	22.48	58.13

Note: The All India total includes land area for Union Territories of India that is not shown in the above table.

== Project classification ==
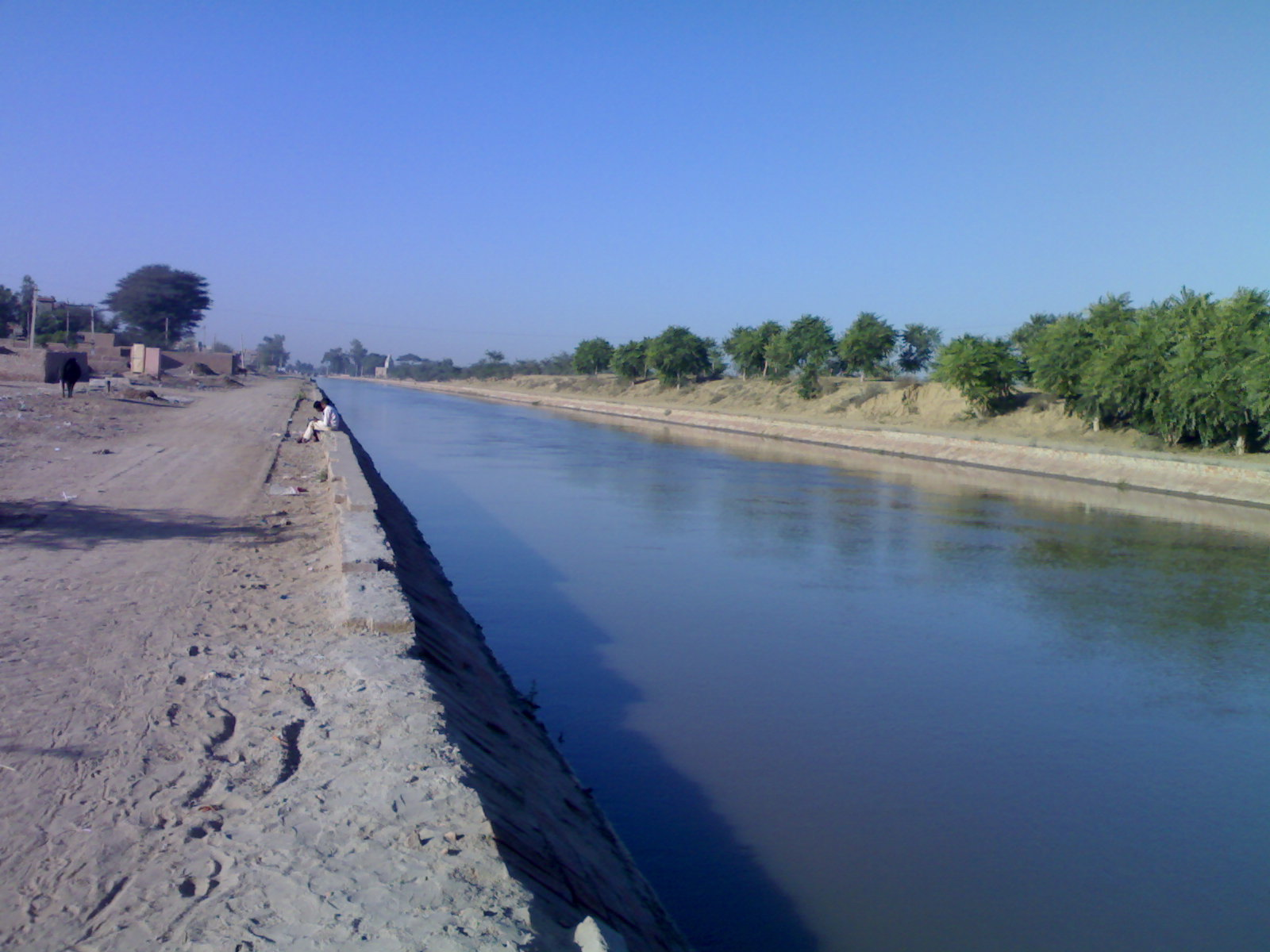
An irrigation canal in western Rajasthan

Irrigation Projects in India are classified as follows:

1. Major irrigation projects
2. Medium irrigation projects
3. Minor irrigation projects
4. Micro-irrigation projects

Since 1950, irrigation works were classified on the basis of cost incurred for the projects' implementation, governing and dissemination. However, the Planning Commission of India adopted the classification of projects on the basis of culturable command area (CCA).

=== Minor irrigation projects ===
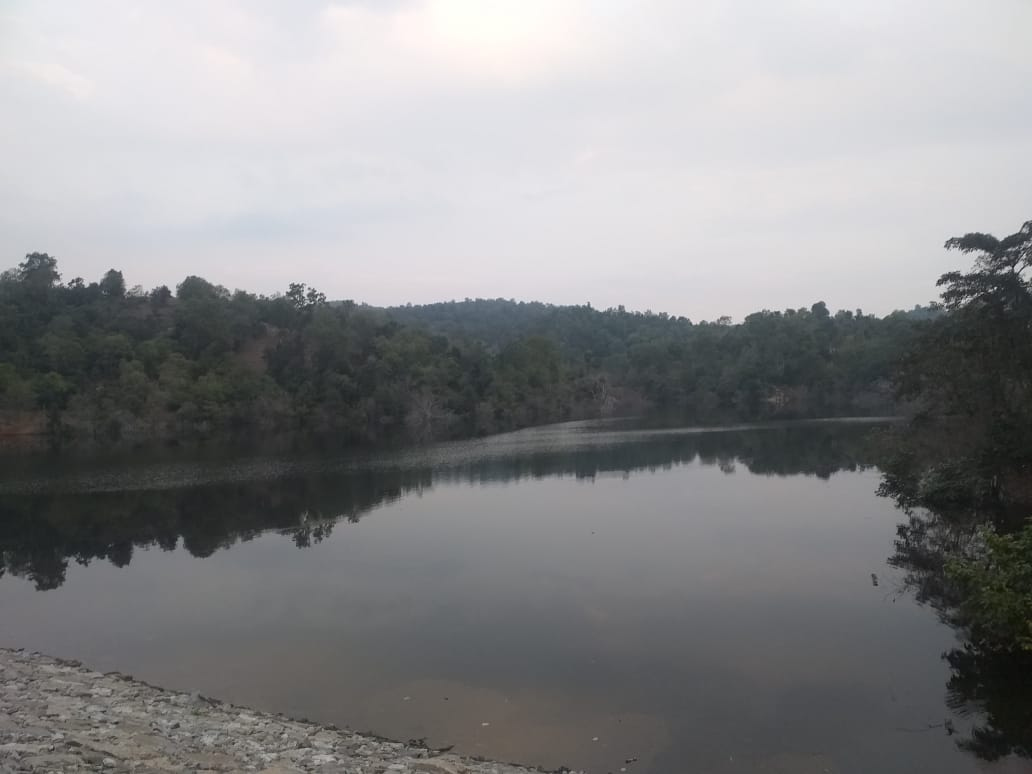
This reservoir of the Mamer Minor Irrigation Project in Rajasthan is an example of a minor irrigation project.

Minor irrigation project is a classification of irrigation projects used in India. A project with a designed to irrigate an area of 2000 hectares or less is classified as a minor irrigation Before the Fifth Five-Year Plan, irrigation schemes were classified on the basis of investments needed to implement the scheme. Since the Fifth Five-Year Plan, India has adopted the command area-based system of classification.

=== Micro irrigation projects ===
Micro Irrigation Fund (MIF) of INR 5,000 crore was established "to bring more land area under micro-irrigation as part of its objective to boost agriculture production and farmers income", NABARD offers low interest rate to state govts "to promote micro-irrigation, which currently has a coverage of only 10 million hectares as against the potential of 70 million hectares." Drip irrigationis promoted.

== See also ==
- Agriculture in India
- Animal husbandry in India
- Electricity sector in India
- Farmers' suicides in India
- Forestry in India
- Indian rivers interlinking project
- Roads in India
