= List of schemes of the government of India =

The Government of India has social welfare and social security schemes for India's citizens funded either by the central government, state government or concurrently. Schemes that the central government fully funds are referred to as "central sector schemes" (CS). In contrast, schemes mainly funded by the center and implemented by the states are "centrally sponsored schemes" (CSS). In the 2022 Union budget of India, there are 740 central sector (CS) schemes. and 65 (+/-7) centrally sponsored schemes (CSS).

From 131 CSSs in February 2021, the union government aimed to restructure/revamp/rationalize these by the next year. In 2022 CSS's numbered 65 with a combined funding of ₹442,781 crore (equivalent to ₹5.4 trillion or US$56 billion in 2026). In 2022, there were 157 CSs and CSSs with individual funding of over ₹500 crore (equivalent to ₹612 crore or US$64 million in 2026) each. Central sector scheme actual spending in 2017-18 was ₹587,785 crore (equivalent to ₹7.2 trillion or US$75 billion in 2026), in 2019-20 it was ₹757,091 crore (equivalent to ₹9.3 trillion or US$96 billion in 2026) while the budgeted amount for 2021-22 is ₹1,051,703 crore (equivalent to ₹13 trillion or US$130 billion in 2026). Schemes can also be categorised as flagship schemes. 10 flagship schemes were allocated ₹1.5 lakh crore (equivalent to ₹1.8 trillion or US$19 billion in 2026) in the 2021 Union budget of India. The subsidy for kerosene, started in the 1950s, was slowly decreased since 2009 and eliminated in 2022.

Implementation of government schemes varies between schemes, and locations, and depends on factors such as evaluation process, awareness, accessibility, acceptability, and capability for last-mile implementation. Government bodies undertaking evaluations and audits include NITI Aayog, Ministry of Statistics and Programme Implementation, and the Comptroller and Auditor General of India.

== List ==
Key

- Scheme: Name with abbreviation and official/literal translation
- CS/CSS: Central Sector / Centrally Sponsored Scheme
- ^{N} New form of existing scheme

Legend

- Flagship schemes 2024
  ₹1.5 lakh crore (equivalent to ₹1.8 trillion or US$19 billion in 2026)
- Partial funding by World Bank
- Subsidy/scheme eliminated

Scheme (Note: Can be labelled as a scheme (Yojana), mission, campaign (Abhiyaan), programme (Karyakaram), project or plan. There is no textbook clarity on the differentiation between the labels including hierarchy.)	CS/CSS	Lead Ministry	Year of Launch	Sector	Summary
One Nation One Subscription	CSS	MoE	2025	Education	One-stop digital library in India with institutional access to global research in various academic disciplines.
PM Vishwakarma	CS	MoMSME	2023	MSME Development	Aims at improving the quality as well as the reach of products and services of artisans and craftspeople and to ensure that they are integrated into the domestic and global value chains.
Amrit Bharat Station Scheme	CSS	MoR	2023	Transportation	Scheme to redevelop existing railway stations and make stations more comfortable and convenient for passengers, and to transform them into vibrant city centers.
PM eBus Seva	CSS	MoHUA	2023	Urban Transport	PM-eBus Sewa supports public transport by deploying 10,000 electric buses under a PPP model. It aids in reducing greenhouse gas emissions and includes urban mobility projects like the National Common Mobility Card for seamless travel in urban areas.
Mahila Samman Savings Certificate (MSSC)	—	—	2023	Finance	MSSC Scheme was launched by the Government of India in Budget 2023 for women and girls in India.
Agnipath Scheme	CS	MoD	2022	Defense	The Agnipath Scheme will be the sole method for recruiting soldiers below the rank of commissioned officers into the three branches of the armed forces. Under this scheme, all recruits, referred to as "Agniveers," will serve for a fixed term of four years. "Agniveer" will also be introduced as a new military rank.
PM Poshan Shakti Nirman Abhiyaan (PM-POSHAN, Prime Minister's Overarching Scheme for Holistic Nourishment, (lit) PM Nutrition Power Building Scheme)	CSS	MoWCD	2021^{[N]}	Health, Education	Revamped version of 1995 Midday Meal Scheme to provide free lunch to school children. Financial outlay in 2022 was ₹10,233 crore (equivalent to ₹130 billion or US$1.3 billion in 2026). Grouped under the umbrella scheme "Saksham Anganwadi and POSHAN 2.0", it aims to reducing stunting, under-nutrition, anemia, and low birth weight.
PM SVANidhi	CSS	MoHUA	2020	Urban Development	Provides working capital loans to street vendors in urban areas, incentivizing repayments and digital transactions.
Strengthening Teaching-Learning and Results for States (STARS)	CSS	MoE	2020	Education	To improve school education in six states covering 10 million teachers. This is a continuation of GOI-World Bank efforts since 1994 towards the same goal. Implemented through Samagra Shiksha Abhiyan.
Svamitva Yojana (Survey of Villages Abadi and Mapping with Improvised Technology in Village Area)	CS	MoPR	2020	Rural development	To help in mapping of properties in villages with the help of drones. Aims in helping to reduce disputes over property. The portal will help in making it easier for villagers to avail bank loans.
Garib Kalyan Rojgar Abhiyaan (Poor Welfare Employment Campaign)	CS	12 ministries	2020	Employment	Employment campaign for the poor following coronavirus pandemic covering 12 ministries and 6 states. Launched on 20 June 2020 and ended on 22 October 2020.
PM Matsya Sampada Yojana (PMMSY, PM Fish Resources Scheme)	CSS	MoFAHD	2020	Fisheries	Nationwide welfare measures for farmers in the fisheries sector. For the period 2020-2024 estimated allocation of ₹20,050 crore (equivalent to ₹250 billion or US$2.5 billion in 2026) for implementation.
PM Kisan Samman Nidhi (PM KISAN, PM Farmer's Tribute Fund)	CS	MoF	2019	Agriculture	Income support of ₹6,000 (equivalent to ₹7,300 or US$76 in 2026) per year to eligible farmers through Direct Benefit Transfer.
Jal Jeevan Mission (Water Life Mission)	CSS	MoJS	2019^{[N]}	Rural development	Accelerated Rural Water Supply Programme began in 1972. Restructured into National Rural Drinking Water Programme (NRDWP) in 2009. To provide water to each rural household through individual taps. Financial outlay in 2022 is ₹60,000 crore (equivalent to ₹730 billion or US$7.6 billion in 2026). Consists of 'Har Ghar Nal Se Jal' or 'Nal Se Jal Scheme'. Also Har Ghar Jal.
Atal Bhujal Yojana (Atal Jal, Atal Groundwater Scheme)	CS	MoJS	2019	Water	World Bank funded scheme (50:50) to improve ground water management with focus on Panchayats. Implementation in seven states between 2020 and 2026 with initial funding of ₹6,000 crore (equivalent to ₹73 billion or US$760 million in 2026).
PM Kisan Urja Suraksha Evam Utthan Mahabhiyan (PM KUSUM Scheme, PM Energy Security and Upliftment Campaign)	CS	MoNRE	2019	Agriculture	For the installation of solar pumps and other renewable power plants across the nation targeted towards farmers. Towards Paris Agreement targets for renewable energy.
PM Shram Yogi Mandhan (PM SYM)	CS	MoLE	2019	Financial security	Social security to unorganized sector and through voluntary contribution and monthly pension after 60 through direct benefit transfer. Implemented by LIC and CSCs.
PM Annadata Aay Sanrakshan Abhiyan (PM AASHA, Farmer Income Protection Scheme)	CS	MoAFW	2018	Agriculture	For farmer welfare through creating a profitable ecosystem for selected products. Consists of sub-schemes such as Price Support Scheme (PSS) and Price Deficiency Payment Scheme (PDPS).
Ayushman Bharat Yojana (AB PM-JAY, Ayushman Bharat Pradhan Mantri Jan Arogya Yojana, People's Health Scheme)	CSS	MoHFW	2018	Health	Ayushman Bharat National Health Protection Scheme (AB-NHPS) aims to provide free access to healthcare for 50 crore people in the country. Implemented across India expect 3 states/UTs. By July 2021 Ayushman cards issued numbered 16.14 crore. By March 2022 hospitalisations under the scheme had crossed 30 million with a valuation of ₹35,000 crore (equivalent to ₹430 billion or US$4.5 billion in 2026).
Samagra Shiksha (National Education Mission)	CSS	MoE	2018	Education	To improve overall effectiveness of schools from pre-nursery to class 12 and other measures. In 2022 it financial outlay allocated ₹37,383 crore (equivalent to ₹460 billion or US$4.8 billion in 2026). Subsumes Sarva Shiksha Abhiyan and others. World Bank supported.
PM Jan Vikas Karyakaram (PMJVK, PM People Progress Programme)	CSS	MoMA	2018^{[N]}	Development	Started in 2008 as Multi-sectoral Development Programme (MSDP). Development of minority concentration areas.
Rashtriya Gram Swaraj Abhiyan (RGSA, National Village Swaraj Campaign)	CSS	MoPR	2018	Rural development	To strengthen Panchayati Raj institutions and support them towards achieving Sustainable Development Goals.
World Class Institutions Scheme	CS	MoE	2017	Education	To enable 10 private and public institutions to attain world class academic and research facilities. Aim is to create Institutes of Eminence.
Khelo India – National Programme for Development of Sports	CS	MoYAS	2017	Sports	Sporting infrastructure, sponsorship, excellence. Competitions such as Khelo India University Games and Winter Games. General fitness of the population.
Saubhagya Yojana	CSS	MoP	2017	Electricity	Last-mile electrification for all households in India. The program focuses on providing power to unelectrified homes, boosting quality of life and aiding socio-economic growth in rural and remote areas.
Krishonnati Yojana	CSS	MoAFW	2017	Agriculture	Umbrella scheme subsuming 11 schemes.
PM Matritva Vandana Yojana (PM Maternity Support Scheme)	—	MoWCD	2017^{[N]}	Mother Care	Launched as the Indira Gandhi Matritva Sahyog Yojana in 2010. Renamed in 2017. A cash incentive of not less than ₹6,000 (equivalent to ₹6,900 or US$72 in 2026) to pregnant/lactating women.
Digital Payment Infrastructure	—	Multiple	2016	Financial Inclusion	Encourages digital transactions through platforms like UPI, RuPay, and FASTag. It is a part of India's strategy to create a cashless economy, improving financial inclusion and transparency while reducing reliance on cash-based transactions.
PM Ujjwala Yojana (PM Lighting Scheme)	CSS	MoP&NG	2016	Energy, Health, Poverty	Launched to provide free LPG connections to women from below poverty line families.
UDAN	CS	MoCA	2016	Aviation	Regional Connectivity Scheme (RCS) - UDAN promotes affordable air travel by connecting unserved and underserved airports. It boosts regional connectivity and supports infrastructure upgrades for tier-2 and tier-3 cities.
PM Fasal Bima Yojana (PM Crop Insurance Scheme)	CS	Multiple	2016	Agriculture	Insurance and finance scheme for farmers.
Stand-Up India	CS	MoF, MoSJE	2016	Entrepreneurship	Loans for scheduled castes, scheduled tribes and women entrepreneurs for greenfield enterprises. Loans can be applied online. By July 2021, 1.16 lakh loans disbursed amounting to ₹26,204 crore (equivalent to ₹320 billion or US$3.3 billion in 2026). By 2022, 81% of loan beneficiaries are women.
National Hydrology Project	CS	MoJS	2016	Water	Multi-pronged project to improve hydrology related practices. World Bank supported. Australian Water Partnership (AWP) provides technical assistance. The Hydrology Project started in 1995 and was expanded through the National Hydrology Project in 2016.
Start-Up India [simple]	CSS	DPIIT (MoCI)	2016	Entrepreneurship	
PM Krishi Sinchai Yojana (PMKSY, PM Agriculture Irrigation Scheme)	CSS	Multiple	2015	Agriculture	Multi-pronged scheme focusing on improving agricultural productivity through irrigation support and better practices. In 2022 financial outlay is ₹10,954 crore (equivalent to ₹130 billion or US$1.4 billion in 2026). Part of Rashtriya Krishi Vikas Yojna.
PM Mudra Yojana (PM Micro Units Development and Refinance Agency Scheme)	CS	MoF	2015	Financing	MUDRA is a financial institution for funding small businesses. 34,42,00,000 beneficiaries have received ₹18.6 lakh crore (equivalent to ₹23 trillion or US$240 billion in 2026). New entrepreneurs consist 22% of the beneficiaries.
Smart Cities Mission	CSS	MoHUA	2015	Urban	Redevelopment, retrofitting, greenfield development of 100 cities. Large diversity in success of implementation.
Digital India	CS	MeitY, MoF	2015	IT	It aims to ensure that government services are available to citizens electronically and people get benefits from the latest information and communication technology. Has expanded into production linked incentives, promotion of electronics manufacturing, R&D and improvement of the National Knowledge Network and electronic governance.
Faster Adoption and Manufacturing of Electric (& Hybrid) Vehicles in India Scheme (FAME India Scheme)	CS	MoHI	2015	Transport, Fuel security	Part of the National Electric Mobility Mission Plan (NEMMP) 2020.
PM Gramin Awas Yojana (PMAY-G, PM Rural Housing Scheme)	CSS	MoRD	2016^{[N]}	Housing, Rural	Original form 1985. Provides financial assistance to rural poor for constructing their houses themselves. This generates income and employment as well. Sample housing designs have been proposed through UNDP, MoRD and IIT, Delhi collaboration.
PM Awaas Yojana - (Urban) (PMAY-R, PM Housing Scheme Urban)	CSS	MoHUA	2015^{[N]}	Housing, Urban	To enable better living and drive economic growth stressing on the need for people centric urban planning and development. It envisages a "Slum Free India" in which every citizen has access to basic civic infrastructure and social amenities. By March 2024, 56,20,000 units had been delivered to beneficiaries.
Atal Pension Yojana (Atal Pension Scheme)	CS	MoF	2015^{[N]}	Pension	Original form in 2010 as the Swavalamban Yojana. A pension program that allows people to make voluntary contributions within a certain range with a matching government contribution to receive pension in the future. By September 2021, non-metros subscribers numbered 3,77,00,000.
PM Suraksha Bima Yojana (PMSBY, PM Safety Insurance Scheme)	CS	MoF	2015	Insurance	This accident insurance scheme is for individuals and can be renewed every year. By May 2021, over 80,000 claims valuing ₹1,629 crore (equivalent to ₹20 billion or US$210 million in 2026) registered.
PM Jeevan Jyoti Bima Yojana (PMJJBY, (lit) PM Life Light Insurance Scheme)	CS	MoF	2015	Insurance	This life insurance scheme for individuals can be renewed every year.
Unnat Jyoti by Affordable LEDs for All (UJALA)	CS	MoP	2015	Electrification	Replaced the "Bachat Lamp Yojana". Reduces the cost of energy-saving compact fluorescent lamps. By the end of 2021, 36,78,00,000 LEDs were distributed resulting in energy savings and reduction in emissions.
PM Kaushal Vikas Yojna (PM Skill Development Scheme)	CS	MoSD&E	2015	Skill development initiative schemes	To provide encouragement to youth for development of employable skills by providing monetary rewards by recognition of prior learning or by undergoing certification training at affiliated centres.
Heritage City Development and Augmentation Yojana (HRIDAY)	CSS	MoUD	2015	Urban Development	The scheme seeks to preserve and rejuvenate the rich cultural heritage of the country.
Sukanya Samridhi Yojana (Girl Child Prosperity Scheme)	—	MoWCD	2015	Girl child	The scheme under Beti Bachao Beti Padhao primarily ensures equitable share to a girl child in resources and savings of a family in which she is generally discriminated as against a male child.
PM Bhartiya Jan Aushadhi Kendra (PM Indian Public Medicine Scheme, PMBJK)	—	MoCF	2015	Generic Medicine	The scheme launched by the Department of Pharmaceuticals, Govt. Of India, to provide quality medicines at affordable prices to the masses.
Deendayal Antyodaya Yojana	CSS	MoRD	2015^{[N]}	Skill Development	Started as Aajeevika - National Rural Livelihoods Mission (NRLM) in 2011. Self-employment programme to raise the income-generation capacity of target groups among the poor. The scheme has been merged with another scheme named Swarnajayanti Gram Swarozgar Yojana (SGSY).
National Career Service (NCS)	—	MoLE	2015	Employment	The objective of this project is to help job-seekers land up at the job they deserve. Under this scheme, an online job-portal named as National Career Service portal has been launched which acts as a common platform for job-seekers, employers, skill providers, government departments, placement organisations and counsellors.
Deendayal Upadhyaya Gram Jyoti Yojana	CS	MoP	2015	Rural Electrification	Programme for creation of rural electricity infrastructure and household electrification for providing access to electricity to rural households. Initially Rajiv Gandhi Grameen Vidyutikaran Yojana launched 2005.
Atal Mission for Rejuvenation and Urban Transformation (AMRUT)	CSS	MoUD	2015^{[N]}	Urban	Preceded by Jawaharlal Nehru National Urban Renewal Mission started in 2005. Water based project to cover urban water ecosystem including taps, conservation and reducing flooding.
Swachh Bharat Abhiyan (Clean India Mission)	CSS	MoDWS, MoHUA	2014	Sanitation, Behaviour	Central Rural Sanitation Programme (CRSP) launched in 1986. In 1999 it became the Total Sanitation Campaign (TSC). Multiple objectives including elimination of open defecation, addressing manual scavenging, and good sanitation and waste related practices.
PM Jan Dhan Yojana (PM's People's Wealth Scheme)	CS	MoF	2014^{[N]}	Financial inclusion	National Mission for Financial Inclusion to ensure access to financial services. Replaced 2011 Swabhiman. The scheme resulted in 36.86 crore new in-use bank accounts by mid-2021.
Deendayal Upadhyaya Grameen Kaushalya Yojana (DDU-GKY, Deen Dayal Upadhyaya Rural Skills Schemes)	—	MRD	2014	Skill Development	A scheme to engage rural youth, especially BPL and SC/ST segments of the population, in gainful employment through skill training programmes
Namami Gange Programme	CS	MoWR	2014^{[N]}	Clean and protect River Ganga	National Ganga Plan was launched in 1985. Integrates the efforts to clean and protect River Ganga in a comprehensive manner.
Rajiv Gandhi Scheme for Empowerment of Adolescent Boys (Saksham)	CS	MoWCD	2014	Skill Development	Aims at all-round development of adolescent boys and make them self-reliant, gender-sensitive and aware citizens, when they grow up. It covers all adolescent boys (both school going and out of school) in the age-group of 11 to 18 years.
Sansad Adarsh Gram Yojana (SAGY, Saanjhi, Member of Parliament Model Village Scheme)	—	MoRD	2014	Development, Rural	To develop model villages. 223 CS/ CSS and 1,806 state schemes converge under SAGY. By 2016, members of parliament adopted 703 Gram Panchayats.
Rashtriya Uchchatar Shiksha Abhiyan (National Higher Education Mission)	CSS	MoE	2013	Education	Improving the quality of higher education in India.
One Stop Crisis Centre (Sakhi)	—	MoWCD	2013	Women	Centre to provide multiple form of aid and shelter to women who have face violence. By 2018, 234 centres had been set up. By 2021 there were 700 centres with plans to set up centres in foreign countries. Some centres lack required facilities.
Direct Benefit Transfer (DBT)	—	—	2013	Finance	State level electronic benefit transfer and Direct Cash Transfer piloted before. Under the Cabinet Secretariat and Ministry of Finance. By 2022, over 300 schemes and 50 ministries are implemented using DBT.
Scheme for Adolescent Girls (SAG, Adolescent Girls (AG) Scheme)	CSS	MoWCD	2011^{[N]}	Skill Development	Formed in 2010 by combining Kishori Shakti Yojana and Nutrition Programme for Adolescent Girls (NPAG) schemes into the Rajiv Gandhi Scheme for Empowerment of Adolescent Girls (RGSEAG) or Sabla. Implemented with Umbrella Integrated Child Development Services (ICDS) Scheme, and then placed under Saksham Anganwadi & Mission Poshan 2.0. Empowering adolescent girls aged 11–18 years with focus on out-of-school girls by improvement in their nutritional and health status and upgrading various skills like home skills, life skills and vocational skills.
PM Adarsh Gram Yojana (PM Model Village Scheme)	—	MoRD	2010	Model Village	Integrated development of Schedule Caste majority villages.
Promotion of University Research and Scientific Excellence (PURSE)	CS	MoST	2009	Infrastructure	To improve infrastructure towards excellence in science and research. Universities to have benefitted include Cochin University of Science and Technology, Mahatma Gandhi University, Kottayam, Kashmir university, Jammu University, Punjab University, University of Delhi, Jadavpur University and Amity University, Rajasthan.
Clean Energy Research Initiative (CERI)	CS	MoST	2009		Improving research capacity with regard to clean energy.
Innovation in Science Pursuit for Inspired Research Programme (INSPIRE Programme)	CS	MoST	2008	Science	Scholarships and internships for top science students, fellowships for pursuing PhD, research grants to researchers.
Cognitive Science Research Initiative (CSRI)	CS	MoST	2008	Science, Health	To work towards scientific quality of life improvements for those with cognitive disorders.
Rashtriya Swasthya Bima Yojana (RSBY, National Health Insurance Programme)	CSS	MoHFW	2008	Insurance	Health insurance to poor (BPL), domestic workers, MGNERGA workers, rikshaw-pullers, building and other construction workers, and many other categories as may be identified by the respective states.
National Action Plan for Climate Change (NAPCC)	CCP	MoST	2008	Climate	Improving science and technology capabilities with regard to climate change.
PM's Employment Generation Programme (PMEGP)	CS	MoMSME	2008	MSME, employment	Aimed at providing employment and self-employment to unemployed. Implemented by Khadi and Village Industries Commission as nodal agency.
Gramin Bhandaran Yojana (Rural Godown Scheme)	—	MoA	2007	Agriculture	Now subsumed under Agricultural Marketing Infrastructure (AMI). Creation of scientific storage capacity with allied facilities in rural areas to meet the requirements of farmers for storing farm produce, processed farm produce and agricultural inputs. Improve their marketability through promotion of grading, standardisation and quality control of agricultural produce.
Rashtriya Krishi Vikas Yojana (RKVY, National Agriculture Development Programme)	CSS	MoA	2007	Agriculture	Allocation in 2022-23 crossed ₹10,400 crore (equivalent to ₹130 billion or US$1.3 billion in 2026). Includes Pradhan Mantri Krishi Sinchai Yojna (Per Drop More Crop) and agricultural mechanization.
National Mission on Nano Science and Technology	CS	MoST	2007	Science	"Umbrella capacity-building programme" targeted towards Nano Science and Technology.
Mahatma Gandhi National Rural Employment Guarantee Act (MG-NREGA)	CSS	MoRD	2005	Rural Wage Employment	Legal guarantee for one hundred days of employment in every financial year to adult members of any rural household willing to do public work-related unskilled manual work at the statutory minimum wage of Rs. 120 per day in 2009 prices.
Pooled Finance Development Fund Scheme (PFDF)	—	MoUD	2006	Urban Infrastructure Development	The scheme enables Urban Local Bodies (ULBs) including small and medium-sized municipalities to raise credit from the market on a sustainable basis to meet their investment needs. PFDF will provide credit enhancement to ULBs to access market borrowings based on their credit worthiness through state level pooled mechanism.
National Creche Scheme	CSS	MoWCD	2006		Rajiv Gandhi National Crèche Scheme for Working Mothers
Janani Suraksha Yojana (Maternity Safety Scheme)	CSS	MoHFW	2005	Mother Care	One-time cash incentive to poor pregnant women and Accredited Social Health Activist (ASHA) for institutional/home births through skilled assistance to reduce child-mother mortality.
National Health Mission	CSS	MoHFW	2005^{[N]}	Health	To improve India's health sector. Financial outlay in 2022 was ₹28,859 crore (equivalent to ₹350 billion or US$3.7 billion in 2026). Includes a number of (subsumed) programmes such as National Mental Health Programme (1982), National Blindness Control Programme (1976) and National Vector Borne Diseases Control Programme (2003).
Livestock Insurance Scheme	CSS	MoA	2005	Agriculture	Initiated as a pilot in 2005 and scaled up to all districts by 2014. Insurance to cattle and attaining qualitative improvement in livestock and their products.
Special Accelerated Road Development Programme (SARDP-NE)	CS	MoRTH	2005	Transport	To improve road connectivity in Northeast India.
Kasturba Gandhi Balika Vidyalaya (Kasturba Gandhi Girls School)	CSS	MoHRD	2004	Education	Educational facilities (residential schools) for girls belonging to SC, ST, OBC, minority communities and families below the poverty line (BPL) in educationally backward blocks.
National Pension System	—	MoF	2004	Pension	Contribution-based pension system. For government employees in 2004 and the general public in 2009.
Deendayal Disabled Rehabilitation Scheme	CS	MoSJE	2003^{[N]}	Social Justice	Original form was the 1999 scheme to Promote Voluntary Action for Persons with Disabilities, with the aim of implementing Persons With Disabilities Act, 1995. DDRS to create an enabling environment to ensure equal opportunities, equity, social justice and empowerment of persons with disabilities.
PM Swasthya Suraksha Yojana (PMSSY, PM Health Protection Scheme)	CS	MoHFW	2003	Health	Improving distribution and accessibility of health services. New AIIMS will be constructed under the scheme.
Sampoorna Grameen Rozgar Yojana (Universal Rural Employment Scheme)	—	MoRD	2001	Rural Self Employment	Providing additional wage employment and food security, alongside creation of durable community assets in rural areas.
Swadhar Greh Scheme (Swadhar, Self-reliance Home Scheme)	CSS	MoWCD	2001	Female welfare	For women in tough circumstances.
PM Gram Sadak Yojana (PMGSY, PM Village Road Scheme)	CSS	MoRD	2000	Rural Development	Good all-weather road connectivity to unconnected villages. World Bank supported.
Antyodaya Anna Yojana (AAY, Antyodaya Food Scheme)	—	MoCAFPD	2000	Hunger	Under the scheme, 1 crore of the poorest among the poor (BPL, below poverty line) families covered under the targeted public distribution system are identified. Issue of ration cards following the recognition of Antyodaya families; unique quota cards to be recognised and "Antyodaya Ration Card" must be given to the Antyodaya families. The scheme has been further expanded twice by additional 50 lakh BPL families each in June 2003 and in August 2004, thus covering 2 crore families under the AAY scheme.
Kishore Vaigyanik Protsahan Yojana (Young Scientist Incentive Plan)	CS	MoST	1999	Science	National fellowship and scholarship programme to encourage students to take up research careers in the areas of basic sciences, engineering and medicine. Exam administered by the Indian Institute of Science.
National Social Assistance Programme	CSS	MoRD	1995	Pension	Financial assistance to pensioners, widows and other target categories.
Members of Parliament Local Area Development Scheme (MPLADS)	CS	MoSPI	1993	Development	Each MP has the choice to suggest to the District Collector for works to the tune of Rs 5 crores per annum to be taken up in their constituency. The Rajya Sabha Member of Parliament can recommend works in one or more districts in the State from where he/she has been elected.
National Scheme on Welfare of Fishermen	CSS	MoA	1992	Agriculture	Financial assistance to fishermen for construction of house, community hall for recreation and common working place and installation of tube-wells for drinking water.
National Social Assistance Scheme	CSS	MoRD	1995	Pension	Public assistance to its citizens in the case of unemployment, old age, sickness and disablement and in other cases of undeserved want.
Eklavya Model Residential School (EMRS)	CS	MoTA	1997	Education	Setting up of new Eklavya Model Residential Schools and improving existing ones. Improvement of enrollment.
National Tuberculosis Elimination Program (NTEP)	CSS	MoHFW	1997	Health	Tuberculosis control initiative.
Voluntary Disclosure of Income Scheme	—	MoF	1997		Opportunity to the income tax/ wealth tax defaulters to disclose their undisclosed income at the prevailing tax rates.
Infrastructure Facilities for Judiciary	CSS	MoLJ	1993	Infrastructure	This includes residential facilities, digital facilities, Gram Nyayalayas.
National Child Labour Projects (NCLP)	—	MoLE	1987	Child labour	Launched in 9 districts in 1987 and has been expanded in 2005 to 250 districts in 21 different states. The objective of this project is to eliminate child labour in hazardous industries by 2010. Under this scheme, the target group is all children below 14 years of age who are working in occupations and processes listed in the Schedule to the Child Labour (Prohibition & Regulation) Act, 1986.
Interlinking of Rivers Project (ILR, NPP, National Perspective Plan)	CSS	MoJS	1980	Water	Development of water resources.
Urea subsidy	CS	MoCF	1977	Subsidy	The first urea subsidy scheme was in 1977 in the form of Retention Price cum Subsidy scheme (RPS). From ₹4,389 crore (US$2.51 billion) in 1990 to ₹75,849 crore (US$17.43 billion) in 2008. As %ofGDP this is an increase from 0.8% to 1.5%. In 2022-23 financial outlay is ₹63,222 crore (equivalent to ₹770 billion or US$8.0 billion in 2026).
Integrated Child Development Services	CSS	MoWCD	1975	Child, Mother care	The scheme aims to tackle malnutrition and health problems in children below 6 years of age and their mothers by providing cash incentives conditional upon registration at Anganwadi centres and vaccination of newborn children.
Food subsidy	CS	MoCAFPD	1972	Subsidy	In 1972 the total food subsidy was ₹117 crore (US$154.84 million). In 1980 it was ₹662 crore (US$840.1 million) and ₹5,250 crore (US$1.62 billion) in 1995. In 2022 financial outlay was ₹2.06 lakh crore (equivalent to ₹2.5 trillion or US$26 billion in 2026). Allocation in 2020-21 had reached ₹5.41 lakh crore (equivalent to ₹6.6 trillion or US$69 billion in 2026), an all-time peak.
National Service Scheme	CS	MoYAS	1969	Public service	Personality development through social (or community) service.
Kerosene subsidy	CS	—	1956	Subsidy	Eliminated in 2021.

== Evaluations ==
The Development Monitoring and Evaluation Office (DMEO) under the NITI Aayog is responsible for evaluations. Evaluation problems exist. Ministries such as the transport ministry can show immediate physical outcomes of their schemes, whereas in health-related schemes, in certain cases, there is no output to show. Surveys trying to ascertain whether someone has benefitted from a scheme or not can result in respondents denying having benefitted with the hope of receiving the benefit again. This kind of respondent bias in its various forms is being addressed by the Ministry of Statistics and Programme Implementation. The Comptroller and Auditor General of India also assesses the implementation of these schemes.

== Effectiveness ==
A number of schemes of successive governments are effective, while others are not effective. Despite various schemes and programmes targeted towards hunger, nutrition remains a severe challenge. The Supreme Court has advised the government to keep finances in mind when coming out with schemes. An example given was the Right of Children to Free and Compulsory Education Act, 2009, where there is a shortage of both schools and teachers. Since their inception, flagship welfare schemes of the Modi government, such as Namami Gange and Ayushman Bharat, have been sanctioned more than what has been spent. A key issue is identifying who should receive scheme benefits and how. In 2017, the Comptroller and Auditor General of India (CAG) called Beti Bachao Beti Padhao a failure as per its own objectives.

== Awareness ==
The government runs various initiatives to increase awareness of government schemes. Awareness of schemes affects the implementation of the schemes as well as who beneficiaries vote for and who they hold responsible for the success or failure of a scheme - the state or center. In 2021-2022 the Government of Goa launched a scheme Swayampurna Goa which involves a government official making eligible beneficiaries aware of the schemes and how to avail them. Nearly 80% of Beti Bachao Beti Padhao funds during 2016-2019 was spent on media advocacy.

== Political credit and blame ==
There is no official or legalised credit-sharing mechanism between the center and states for the schemes.

In 2014, Congress blamed the Modi government for taking credit for schemes undertaken by previous governments. In 2017, Bharatiya Janata Party (BJP) blamed Telangana Rashtra Samithi (TRS) for taking credit. The Himachal Pradesh government blamed NITI Aayog for a cut in funding to centrally sponsored schemes. In 2019, Mamata Banerjee blamed Modi for taking credit for Ayushman Bharat. In 2020, Modi blamed Aam Aadmi Party for not implementing a centrally sponsored sector scheme. In 2021, Smriti Irani blamed Mamata Banerjee for taking credit for schemes of the central government. BJP blamed Jharkhand Mukti Morcha for not implementing schemes properly.

Welfare schemes are used as electoral campaigns, with beneficiaries treated as voters. Bharatiya Janata Party (BJP) has used its implementation of schemes as a vote bank in the 2017 and 2022 Uttar Pradesh Legislative Assembly elections, and the 2019 Indian general election.

== Rationalisation ==
Rationalisation is a means to improve governance of schemes. In 2002 (Vajpayee govt) there were about 360 CSSs. In 2022(Modi govt) there were 704 CSs. In 2016 a committee came out with the recommendation of rationalising, revamping and restructuring 66 CSSs, grouping them into umbrella schemes, core schemes and optional schemes on the basis of which identification would be easier and funding patterns would differ, among other recommendations.

In the case of a mission, or a scheme or programme becoming a mission or being coupled under a mission, it can mean a signal of prioritization with regard to implementation and funding. Similar schemes can be merged into each other and revamped. A mission can be merged into a new scheme.

== State sponsored schemes list ==
=== Karnataka ===
- Vajpayee Arogyasri Yojana
- Shaadi Bhagya scheme

=== Madhya Pradesh ===
- Bhavantar Bhugtan Yojana
- Deen Dayal Antyoday Upchar Yojna
- Deen Dayal Mobile Health Clinic
- Ladli Laxmi Yojana
- Madhya Pradesh Rural Livelihoods Project
- Mukhya Mantri Yuva Swarozgar Yojana

=== Maharashtra ===
(आधार कार्ड ने बँक बॅलेंस चेक करा 2025 (How to Check My Bank Balance With Aadhar Card in 2025 )

(मुख्यमंत्री सहाय्यता निधी योजना 2025 ऑनलाईन अर्ज (Mukhyamantri Sahayata Nidhi Yojana 2025 in Marathi)

(कुसुम सोलर योजना 2025 असा करा ऑनलाइन अर्ज (Apply online for Kusum Solar Yojana 2025)

(मागेल त्याला शेततळे योजना 2025 ऑनलाईन अर्जऑनलाईन अर्ज ( magel tyala shettale yojana 2025 online arj)

(MAHA-DBT शेतकरी योजना 2025 ऑनलाईन अर्ज ( MAHA-DBT setakari yojana online arja 2025)

(मागेल त्याला विहीर अनुदान योजना 2025 ऑनलाईन अर्ज,पात्रता ( Magal tyala vihir anudan yojana 2025 online form, eligibility )

(नमो शेतकरी महा सन्मान निधी योजना 2025 ऑनलाईन अर्ज ( Namo Shetkari Maha Sanman Nidhi Yojana 2025 in Marathi )

(मुख्यमंत्री रोजगार हमी योजना (जॉब कार्ड) – महाराष्ट्र राज्यातील रोजगारासाठी एक नवीन संधी)

(महात्मा ज्योतिराव फुले शेतकरी कर्जमुक्ती योजना 2025 – महाराष्ट्रातील शेतकऱ्यांसाठी आर्थिक मदत)

(शिवभोजन थाळी योजना : गरिबांसाठी सवलतीच्या दरात पोषणयुक्त आहार 2025 )

( प्रधानमंत्री आवास योजना शहरी (Urban) 2025 : महाराष्ट्र राज्यात स्वतः च्या घराचे स्वप्न आता होणार पूर्ण )

(राजश्री शाहू महाराज संजीवनी योजना 2025 – महिलांसाठी एक विशेष आरोग्य सेवा)

(मुख्यमंत्री रोजगार निर्माण योजना मिळवा 10 लाखांपर्यंत व्यवसाय कर्ज )

(लेक लाडकी योजना 2025 : महाराष्ट्रातील गरीब मुलींना मिळणार 1 लाख 1 हजार रुपये (Lek Ladki Yojana 2025 in Marathi ))

(संजय गांधी निराधार अनुदान योजना 2025 : महाराष्ट्रातील गरजूंना दिलासा)

(महात्मा फुले जीवनदायी आरोग्य योजना 2025 : गरीबांसाठी आरोग्याचा आधार )

=== Telangana ===
- Aarogya Lakshmi scheme
- Aasara pension
- Amma Odi & KCR Kit
- Double Bedroom Housing scheme
- Kalyana Lakshmi - Shaadi Mubarak
- Mission Bhagiratha
- Rythu Bandhu scheme
- Telangana Ku Haritha Hāram
- Telangana Sheep Distribution scheme
- 2 Rupees Kg Rice
- Mahalakshmi Free Bus Scheme
- 2500rs for one Mahalakshmi scheme

=== Odisha ===
- List of schemes of the government of Odisha

=== Tamil Nadu ===
- Amma Unavagam
- Samathuvapuram
- Uzhavar Santhai
- midday meal scheme
- Women Free Bus
- married Women 1000 rupees

=== West Bengal ===
- Kanyashree Prakalpa
- Sabuj Sathi
- Rupashree Prakalpa
- Swami Vivekananda Merit-cum-Means Scholarship
- Yuvashree
- Banglar Awas Yojna
- Krishak Bandhu
- Swasthya Sathi
- Khadya Sathi
- Sabujshree

=== Uttar Pradesh ===
- Kamdhenu Yojna
- Free laptop distribution scheme

== See also ==
- Welfare schemes for women in India
- Social security in India
- Food security in India
- Welfare state
- Indian missions
- Subsidies in India
- India and the World Bank
- NITI Aayog
