= IdeaForge Technology =

Indian aerospace company

ideaForge Technology Limited
- Type: Public
- Traded as: NSE: IDEAFORGE; BSE: 543932
- Industry: Aerospace, defense
- Founded: 2007
- Founders: Ankit Mehta; Rahul Singh; Ashish Bhat; Vipul Joshi
- Headquarters: Navi Mumbai, Maharashtra, India
- Area served: Worldwide
- Key people: Ankit Mehta (CEO); Ashish Bhat (CTO); Rahul Singh (CTO); Vipul Joshi (CFO)
- Number of employees: 500+ (2025)
- Website: ideaforgetech.com

ideaForge Technology Limited is an Indian aerospace company based in Navi Mumbai, Maharashtra. Founded in 2007 by graduates of the Indian Institute of Technology Bombay, it designs and manufactures unmanned aerial vehicles, including multi-rotor and hybrid vertical take-off and landing systems. Its shares have traded on the National Stock Exchange and Bombay Stock Exchange since July 2023.

== History ==
The company was incorporated on 8 February 2007 by Ankit Mehta, Rahul Singh, and Ashish Bhat, who had developed early quadrotor prototypes while studying at IIT Bombay. It was incubated at the Society for Innovation and Entrepreneurship (SINE), a technology incubator affiliated with the institute, and initially focused on multi-rotor platforms for surveillance and aerial imaging. In 2009, it developed a vertical take-off and landing unmanned aerial vehicle.

Civilian operations were constrained during the mid-2010s by regulatory restrictions on drone usage in India, including a 2014 ban on private drone operations. The company launched its initial public offering in July 2023.

It made a minority investment of ₹15.96 crore in Vantage Robotics, a U.S.-based compact UAV company, in February 2025, and formed a joint venture with Maryland-based First Breach Inc. later that year, establishing First Forge Technology Inc. The SWITCH UAS received Type Certification from the Directorate General of Civil Aviation in August under India's Drone Rules, 2021, in the small category. In April 2026, it signed a non-binding memorandum of understanding with Japan's Digital Media Professionals Inc. to integrate the Di1 edge-AI chip into its platforms, with DMP serving as its partner in Japan.

== Products and services ==
The company's hardware includes multi-rotor platforms, hybrid VTOL systems, and micro-UAVs. Its products include the NETRA, Q6, and NINJA multi-rotor models, and the SWITCH hybrid VTOL system. The NETRA was co-developed with the Defence Research and Development Organisation's Research and Development Establishment.

It develops flight control, telemetry, and data-transmission software, including navigation systems that operate when satellite positioning is unavailable. The company offers maintenance, repair, and overhaul services, drone services, and remote pilot training. In May 2025, the Directorate General of Civil Aviation certified ideaForge to conduct Remote Pilot Certificate training for small unmanned aircraft systems.

== Military and government use ==
Indian security forces have used its systems for surveillance along the Line of Control and the Line of Actual Control. Its drones were deployed in disaster response during the 2013 Uttarakhand floods and the 2021 Chamoli glacial outburst, and have been used for aerial surveys under the government's SVAMITVA scheme to digitize rural land records.

In January 2025, the SWITCH MINI UAV received "Fit for Indian Military Use" certification from the Directorate General of Quality Assurance. In May 2025, following Operation Sindoor, the Indian Army placed an order worth approximately ₹137 crore for hybrid Mini UAVs for counter-insurgency and counter-terrorism operations. The Q6 V2 and SWITCH were assigned NATO Stock Numbers in September 2025.

== Legal matters ==
=== Garuda Aerospace dispute ===
In 2023, Chennai-based Garuda Aerospace filed a First Information Report alleging that ideaForge had remotely disabled software on 15 RYNO (Q4i-Micro) drones that Garuda had purchased for approximately ₹2.2 crore. Garuda claimed the deactivation occurred in June 2023. It said the disruption affected work on government projects, including aerial surveys under the SVAMITVA scheme in Lucknow and a project with the Odisha government. It also alleged that the disruption contributed to its blacklisting by Odisha authorities. ideaForge denied the allegations. It stated that Garuda had tampered with the equipment and attempted to access proprietary technology, and said it retained the right to deactivate software licence keys in cases involving misuse or contractual violations.

In January 2025, the Madras High Court declined to quash the FIR, noting that disputed facts required examination at trial. The Supreme Court of India later declined to grant a stay of proceedings. In April 2025, a Chennai Metropolitan Magistrate's court issued a non-bailable warrant against the company's Chief Financial Officer for non-compliance with bail conditions; the warrant was recalled after the company reported compliance.

=== Supply chain scrutiny ===
In early 2025, media reports and public-interest inquiries raised questions about foreign-origin components, including Chinese-origin parts, in some ideaForge drone platforms offered to security agencies. In February 2025, the Government e-Marketplace reportedly disqualified two vendors associated with ideaForge after technical evaluations found that submitted products did not meet "Make in India" compliance standards. ideaForge responded that the components in question were non-critical parts sourced from a Swiss original equipment manufacturer with manufacturing in China, and stated that its primary military platforms undergo mandatory audits and comply with applicable security requirements.

== See also ==
- Unmanned aerial vehicle
- List of companies of India
