= Goa AI Mission 2027 =

The Goa AI Mission 2027 is a policy initiative of the Government of Goa aimed at transforming the state from a tourism-driven economy into a technology-oriented, artificial intelligence (AI)-enabled innovation hub. The initiative was officially launched in July 2025 under the leadership of Chief Minister Mr. Pramod Sawant.

The mission aims to empower citizens, strengthen governance, and promote innovation across sectors. Chief Minister of Goa, Mr. Pramod Sawant, along with the Minister of Information Technology, Rohan Khaunte, has urged stakeholders to participate in shaping the initiative. Key components of the mission include the development of a dedicated Goa AI Policy and the establishment of an AI Advisory Council.

In late March 2026, the Government of Goa has implemented digital transformation policies aimed at incorporating AI into public governance, expanding digital infrastructure, and developing technology skills training programs.

== Key pillars and focus areas ==
The Goa AI Mission is structured around four key pillars: skilling, startups and companies, capital, and government and infrastructure. The initiative aims to introduce AI education in schools and colleges, support the establishment of AI laboratories, and develop a Konkani Large Language Model (LLM) to digitally preserve the state's cultural and linguistic heritage. Local AI startups Neural Private Ltd and Genora Infotech have voiced support for the mission. The mission additionally aims to build both physical and digital AI research infrastructure through partnerships between academic institutions and global partners.

== Key initiatives and partnerships ==
=== Inter-agency collaboration on language AI ===
A Memorandum of Understanding (MoU) was signed in August 2025 between the Department of Information Technology, Electronics & Communications (DITE&C) of the Government of Goa and the Digital India Bhashini Division under the Ministry of Electronics and Information Technology. The collaboration aims to introduce multilingual AI solutions into Goa's public systems, with the objective of enhancing inclusivity and improving accessibility of governance for citizens from diverse linguistic and social backgrounds.

=== Sarvam AI collaboration ===
In September 2025, the Government of Goa, through its Department of Information Technology, Electronics & Communications (DITE&C), partnered with Bengaluru-based Sarvam AI, the first startup chosen under the IndiaAI Mission to develop India's sovereign AI model. The company expressed a strong commitment to Goa's AI vision, planning to contribute through policy research, the creation of an AI Centre of Excellence, and the co-development of AI-powered services for citizens. Sarvam AI also introduced its flagship generative AI platforms, Sarvam Samvaad for conversational AI, Sarvam Arya as an enterprise reasoning engine, and Vistaar, a serverless AI deployment platform; all thoughtfully designed to work with Indian languages and reflect the country's cultural nuances.

=== AI Kosh contribution ===
On 8 March 2026, the Department of Information Technology of the Government of Goa prepared a draft Artificial Intelligence (AI) policy and circulated it among stakeholders for feedback. On 13 March 2026, Information Technology Minister Rohan Khaunte stated that the Goa government is developing a comprehensive AI policy, expected to be introduced within the next 100 days. The proposed policy is designed around the principle of “AI with a Human Touch,” aiming to promote the responsible, ethical, and inclusive adoption of artificial intelligence in governance and public services.

== Events and outreach ==
On 17 February 2026, Goa affirmed its commitment to artificial intelligence at the India AI Impact Summit 2026.

On April 29, 2026, the Government of Goa, released a draft AI policy, aims to develop the state into a hub for technology and high-tech innovation.
