= National Social Assistance Scheme =

Indian government centrally sponsored scheme

National Social Assistance Scheme (NSAP)
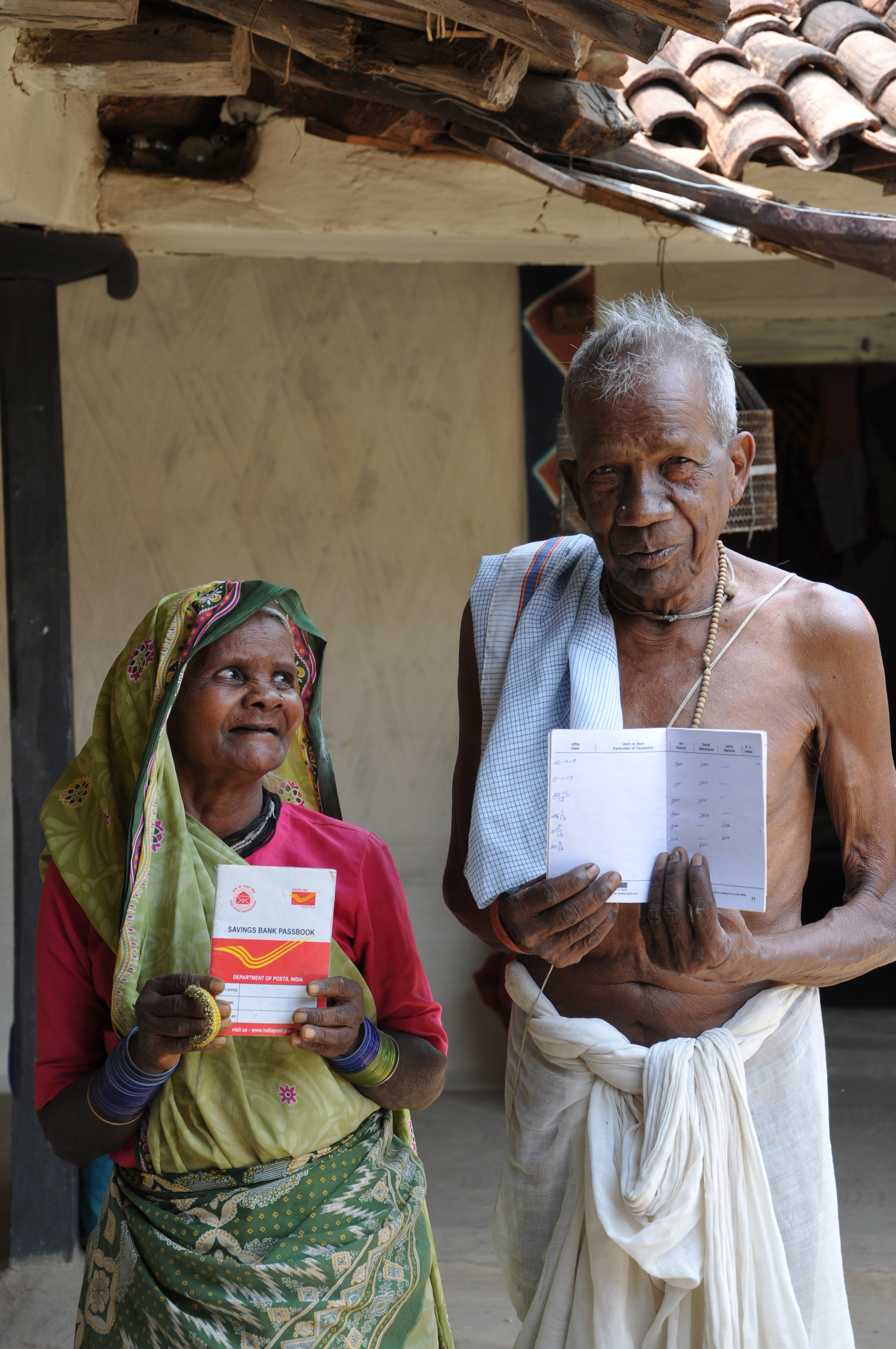
- Old age pensioners in Sarguja district of Chhattisgarh
- Country: India
- Launched: 1995
- Status: Active
- Website: nsap.nic.in

The National Social Assistance Programme (NSAP) is a Centrally Sponsored Scheme of the Government of India that provides financial assistance to the elderly poor, poor widows/widowers and persons with disabilities below a certain income threshold in the form of social pensions. The NSAP scheme only includes Below Poverty Line individuals as beneficiaries.

== History ==
Article 41 of the Indian Constitution directs the State to provide public assistance to its citizens in case of 'unemployment, old age, sickness and disablement and in other cases of undeserved want within the limit of its economic capacity and development'.

1995: The NSAP is launched with the aim of providing social assistance to destitutes "defined as any person who has little or no regular means of subsistence from his/her own source of income or through financial support from family members or other sources". The NSAP includes three components: National Old Age Pension Scheme (NOAPS), National Family Benefit Scheme (NFBS), and National Maternity Benefit Scheme (NMBS).

2000: Annapurna Yojana is introduced to provide eligible beneficiaries, who were not covered under NOAPS, 10 kg of free rice.

2001: NMBS is transferred to the Department of Family Welfare.

2006: Monthly pension amount for NOAPS raised from ₹75 (78¢ US) to ₹200 (US$2.10)

2007: The NSAP is extended to cover all individuals living below the poverty line. The NOAPS is renamed Indira Gandhi National Old Age Pension Scheme (IGNOAPS).

2009: The NSAP is expanded to include the Indira Gandhi National Widow Pension Scheme (IGNWPS) – for widows aged 40–64 years – and the Indira Gandhi National Disability Pension Scheme (IGNDPS) – for persons with multiple or severe disabilities aged 18–64 years living below the poverty line.

2011: Age limit for IGNOAPS is lowered from 65 to 60 years under IGNOAPS and monthly pension amount for those 80 years and above is raised from ₹200 (US$2.10) to ₹500 (US$5.20). Age limits for IGNWPS and IGNDPS are changed to 40–59 and 18–59, respectively.

2012: Monthly pensions under IGNWPS and IGNDPS increased from ₹200 (US$2.10) to ₹300 (US$3.10). Age limit changed to 40–79 years and 18–79 years, respectively.

2013: Report of the Task Force on Comprehensive Social Assistance Programme submitted to the Government of India. Recommends raising monthly pension and expanding coverage.

== Components ==
The National Assistance Program consists of five sub-schemes:

=== Indira Gandhi National Old Age Pension Scheme (IGNOAPS) ===
The Indira Gandhi National Old Age Pension Scheme (IGNOAPS) is a non-contributory old age pension scheme that covers Indians who are 60 years and above and live below the poverty line. All individuals above the age of 60 who live below the poverty line are eligible to apply for IGNOAPS. All IGNOAPS beneficiaries aged 60–79 receive a monthly pension of Rs. 300 (Rs. 200 by central government and Rs. 100 by state government). Those 80 years and above receive a monthly pension amount of Rs. 500.States are strongly urged to provide an additional amount at least an equivalent amount to the assistance provided by the Central Government so that the beneficiaries can get a decent level of assistance .

=== Indira Gandhi National Widow Pension Scheme (IGNWPS) ===
Indira Gandhi National Widow Pension Scheme(IGNWPS), introduced in the year 2009, provides BPL(Below Poverty Line) widows in the age group 40 to 59(later revised 40 to 79 WEF 01.10.2012) with a monthly pension of Rs. 200 (later revised to Rs. 300 WEF 01.10.2012) per beneficiary. This programme was started in 2009 under the ministry for rural development. </http://www.nsap.nic.in/guidelines.html#>

=== Indira Gandhi National Disability Pension Scheme (IGNDPS) ===
Eligibility: Individuals aged 18 years and above with more than 80% disability and living below the poverty line.

Amount: ₹300 (US$3.10) per month (₹500 (US$5.20) for those 80 years and above).

=== National Family Benefit Scheme (NFBS) ===
In the event of death of a bread-winner in a household, the bereaved family will receive lumpsum assistance of 20,000. The bread-winner should have been between 18 and 64 years of age. The assistance would be provided in every case of death of primary bread-winner in a household.

=== Annapurna Scheme ===
This scheme aims to provide food security to meet the requirement of those senior citizens who, though eligible, have remained uncovered under the IGNOAPS. Under the Annapurna Scheme, 10 kg of free rice is provided every month to each beneficiary.

== Administration ==
The scheme is administered by the Ministry of Rural Development, Government of India. It is fully funded by the Central Government, unlike some other welfare programs where the Union government shares costs with the State Governments.

Allocation of funds for NSAP by Government of India between 2009–10 and 2014–15 (in Crore Rs.):

Financial year	NSAP allocation
2009–10	5,200
2010–11	5,162
2011–12	6,596
2012–13	8,447
2013–14	9,541
2014–15	10,635

== State-level initiatives in social pensions ==
The implementation of social pensions varies considerably across states. Through state-level initiatives, many State Governments have expanded coverage beyond BPL households by relaxing eligibility criteria and increased monthly pension amounts using state finances. One such example is Lakshmi Bai Social Security Pension Scheme, launched by Government of Bihar, to cover all widows not covered under IGNWP. This scheme is one of the many Social Security initiatives taken up by Government of Bihar being implemented by Department of Social Welfare through State Society for Ultra Poor and Social Welfare, also known as SAKSHAM.

=== Relaxed eligibility criteria ===
Many State Governments have either stopped using the BPL methodology for identifying eligible beneficiaries or launched state-level pension schemes to increase coverage of social pensions beyond those living below the poverty line.

States such as Delhi and Haryana have moved to near-universal coverage by adopting exclusion criteria (for example in Haryana, all residents above 59 years of age with an annual income from all sources less than ₹2 lakh (US$2,100) are eligible for old-age pension).

Other states have launched state pension schemes that cover individuals from non-BPL households who are not eligible for social pensions under NSAP. In Odisha, for instance, all elderly above 59 years of age and widows whose annual income from all sources is below ₹24,000 (US$250) are eligible for the Madhu Babu Pension Scheme.

As the Indira Gandhi National Widow Pension Scheme (IGNWPS) only covers widows aged 40–59, some State Governments have launched state widow pension schemes. In Chhattisgarh, the Sukhad Sahara Yojana provides a monthly pension to all widows aged 18–50. The Lakshmi Bai Pension Yojana in Bihar covers all widows above 18 years of age whose annual family income is below ₹60,000 (US$620).

Similarly, the Indira Gandhi National Disability Pension Scheme (IGNDPS) only covers individuals with more than 80% disability. To address this gap in coverage, states like Bihar and Rajasthan have launched State Disability Pension schemes that cover individuals with more than 40% disability.

=== Increase in pension amounts ===
The Government of India has urged State Governments to make matching contributions with the aim of doubling the monthly pension amounts. The table below shows monthly pension amounts in various states:

State / UT	Old age pension	Widow pension	Disability pension
Andhra Pradesh	4000	4000	6000
Arunachal Pradesh	1500 (60-80 Age), 2000 (above 80 Age)	3000 2000	2000
Assam	200 (60-80 Age), 500 (above 80 Age)	300 (40-80 Age), 500 (above 80 Age)	300 (up to 80 Age), 500 (above 80 Age)
Bihar	1000 (60-80 Age), 500 (above 80 Age)	1000	10000
Chandigarh	2000	2000	2000
Chhattisgarh	350 (60-80 Age), 650 (above 80 Age)	350	500
Delhi	2000 (60-70 Age), 2500 (above 70 Age)	2500	2500
Gujarat	750 (60-80 Age), 1000 (above 80 Age)	1250	750 (60-75 Age), 1000 (above 75 Age)
Haryana	3000	3000	3000
Himachal Pradesh	750 (60-70 Age), 1300 (above 70 Age)	750	750 (40%-69% disability), 1300 (80% or more disability)
Jammu and Kashmir	1000	1000	1000
Jharkhand	600	600	600
Kerala	1600	1600	1600
Ladakh	1000	1000	1000
Madhya Pradesh	600 (60-80 Age), 800 (above 80 Age)	600	600
Maharashtra	100	150	150
Manipur	200 (60-80 Age), 500 (above 80 Age)	300	300
Meghalaya	500 (60-80 Age), 550 (above 80 Age)	500	500
Mizoram	300 (60-80 Age), 600 (above 80 Age)	400	400
Nagaland	300 (60-80 Age), 600 (above 80 Age)	300 (40-80 Age), 500 (above 80 Age)	300
Odisha	500 (60-80 Age), 700 (above 80 Age)	500	500
Punjab	1500	1500	1500
Rajasthan	750 (60-75 Age), 1000 (above 75 Age)	500 (18-55 Age), 750 (55-60 Age), 1000 (60-75 Age), 1500 (above 75 Age)	750 (Disability), 1500 (Leprosy Person)
Sikkim	1500 (60-70 Age), 2000 (70-80 Age), 2500 (above 80 Age)	2000	2000
Tamil Nadu	400	400	400
Telangana	2000	2000	4000
Tripura	800 (60-80 Age), 700 (above 80 Age)	700	700 (Others than 100% Blind Beneficiaries), 1200 (100% Blind Beneficiaries)
Uttrakhand	1500	1500	1500
Uttar Pradesh	1000	1000	1000
West Bengal	1000	1000	1000

== Research and evaluation ==
Recent studies of NSAP show that the social pension schemes are performing 'reasonably well' and 'levels of leakage are low and tractable'.

A 2014 study by the National Bureau of Economic Research (NBER) concludes that "the Indian government should increase the pension amount to lower the risk of poverty among the elderly, and work to expand inclusion of the most vulnerable groups."

Based on a study of social pensions in three states (Delhi, Haryana and Uttar Pradesh) in 2014, the World Bank makes a case for scaling up social pensions in India. The study raises four important points regarding expanding coverage of social pensions: "First, an expansion in coverage by adding more numbers (as Haryana has done) is likely to reduce the risk of exclusion of the poor. Second, expansion is unlikely to render the social pension completely regressive in its distribution or change the positive impact it has on vulnerability. Third, an increase in the size of the pension amount (for example, in Delhi) may not necessarily increase the incentive to cheat. Leakages, while present, are likely to be concentrated in particular areas and can be curbed through policy action. Fourth, while bribes have crept in the release of pensions, they can be curtailed through timely and direct disbursement of pension funds into beneficiaries' bank accounts." The study identifies the application process as the 'biggest obstacle' to expanding coverage of social pensions.

According to a 10-state survey of social pensions in 2013, "there is strong evidence to support the fact that the money is reaching the intended beneficiaries without any major leakages ... evaluation of the scheme also brings to the fore issues related to the diminutive amount, inefficient disbursal mechanism, cost of collection and the lack of a fixed pattern of payment. A 2025 study examining the participation of older adults in social welfare schemes found that participation was associated with better quality of life.

== Report of the task force, Ministry of Rural Development (2013) ==
In October 2012, the Government of India set up a task force to come up with a proposal for a Comprehensive Social Assistance Programme. Some of the recommendations from the report submitted in March 2013 are listed below:

1. Increase IGNOAPS from ₹200 (US$2.10) to ₹300 (US$3.10) per month
2. Reduce minimum age requirement for IGNWPS from 40 to 18 years
3. Revise eligibility criteria for IGNWPS to include divorced/separated/abandoned women who, according to the report, face the same discrimination as widows
4. Reduce disability level from 80% to 40%
5. Assistance to be provided in the event of the death of any adult member (and not just male members) to the bereaved family under NFSB
6. Pension amounts should be indexed to inflation using the criteria adopted for dearness allowance
7. Coverage should be expanded with the aim of covering all households eligible for benefits under the NFSA
8. Pro-active identification of beneficiaries with no demand for documentary proof from applicants.
9. Pension payments must follow a fixed monthly schedule - this should be a 'non-negotiable requirement'
10. Cash payments should be discouraged; states may move to bank or post office based systems
11. Pension payment method should be adopted keeping in mind that no pensioner should have to travel beyond three km to collect pension; ultimate goal should be to ensure door-step delivery of pensions

The Government of India is yet to implement most of these recommendations.

== Pension Parishad ==
The Pension Parishad – an initiative to ensure universal pension to all workers in India – has been demanding that the Government of India establish a "non-contributory and universal old age pension system with a minimum amount of monthly pension not less than 50% of the minimum wage or ₹2,000 (US$21), whichever is higher."

Other important demands of the Pension Parishad include the following:

- Any individual 55 years or older should be eligible for old age pension; for women, eligibility to be 50 years or older
- APL/BPL criteria should not be used for exclusion

== Issues and debates ==
=== Use of BPL methodology for identification of beneficiaries ===
There has been an ongoing debate in India over the use of BPL status for identifying beneficiaries for social programs. This is especially true for social pensions where many poor elderly, widows and persons with disability are excluded from the NSAP as their names are not on the BPL list. Many states have expanded coverage of pension schemes by including non-BPL individuals based on their annual income or using a simple exclusion criteria to exclude individuals with government jobs or those owning more than a certain amount of land.

=== Low monthly pension amounts ===
There has been severe criticism of the Government of India for not increasing the monthly pension provided to the elderly, widows and persons with disability in India. The harshest criticism came from the then Minister of Rural Development, Jairam Ramesh, who described the low monthly pension amounts as 'an insult to the dignity' of the elderly. While the Government of India maintains that State Governments should make a matching contribution to social pensions, the amount would still not account for the rise in living costs over the past decade. The Pension Parishad has demanded that the government raise the monthly pension to half of the minimum wage or ₹2,000 (US$21), whichever is higher. Similarly, the Task Force setup to review the NSAP recommended that pensions be indexed to inflation and increased using a method similar to that of dearness allowance.

== See also ==
- Atal Pension Yojana
