= Pradhan Mantri Bharatiya Janaushadhi Pariyojana =

Government of India's generic medicine's scheme

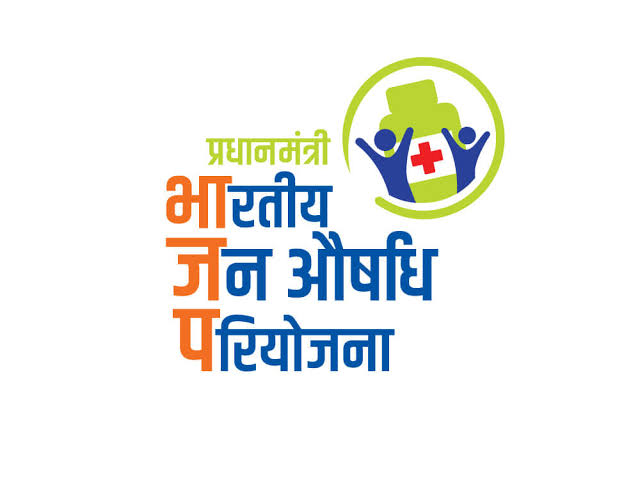

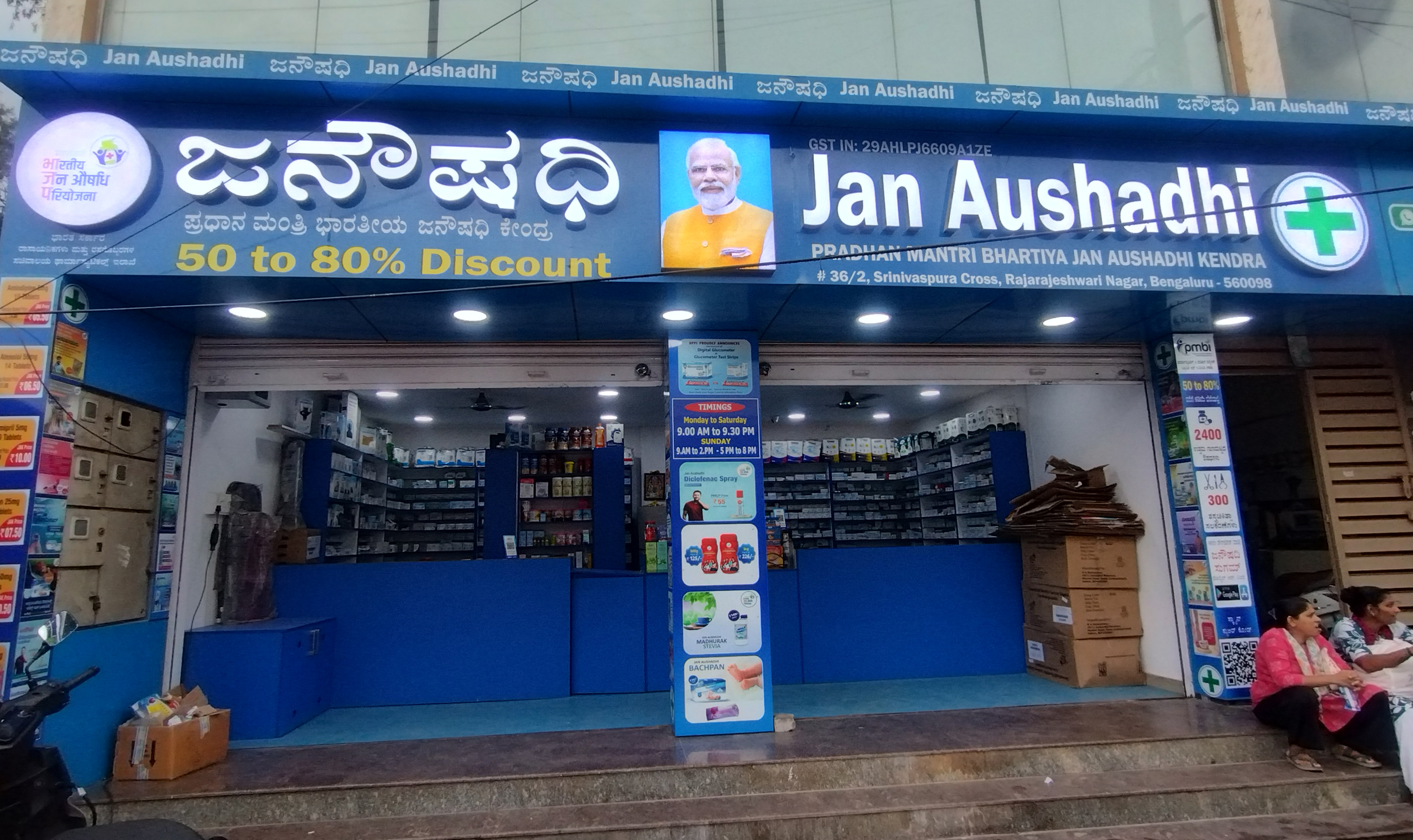
- A Janaushadhi store at RR Nagar, Bengaluru, in 2026

Agency overview
- Formed: November 2008; 17 years ago
- Headquarters: New Delhi, India
- Parent department: Department of Pharmaceuticals
- Website: janaushadhi.gov.in

Pradhan Mantri Bharatiya Janaushadhi Pariyojana (PMBJP) (transl. Prime Minister’s Indian Public Medicine Scheme) is a campaign and public welfare scheme of the Government of India, launched in 2008 as the Jan Aushadhi Scheme by the Ministry of Chemicals and Fertilizers. The initiative was rebranded in 2016 as the Pradhan Mantri Bhartiya Janaushadhi Pariyojana (PMBJP) to expand its scope and strengthen its mission of providing quality generic medicines at affordable prices to the public.

The scheme's centres have been set up to provide generic drugs, which are available at lesser prices but are equivalent to more expensive branded drugs in both quality and efficacy. The Bureau of Pharma Public Sector Undertakings of India (BPPI) has been established under the Department of Pharmaceuticals, Govt. of India, with the support of all the CPSUs for co-ordinating procurement, supply and marketing of generic drugs through the centres.

The scheme was initially launched by the government in 2008; and relaunched by the Prime Minister of India, Narendra Modi in 2015. The campaign was undertaken through sale of generic medicines through exclusive outlets namely Jan Aushadhi Medical Store in various districts of the country. In September 2015, the 'Jan Aushadhi Scheme' (transl. Public medicine scheme) was revamped as 'Pradhan Mantri Jan Aushadhi Yojana' (PMJAY). In November 2016, to give further impetus to the scheme, it was again renamed as "Pradhan Mantri Bharatiya Janaushadhi Pariyojana" (PMBJP).

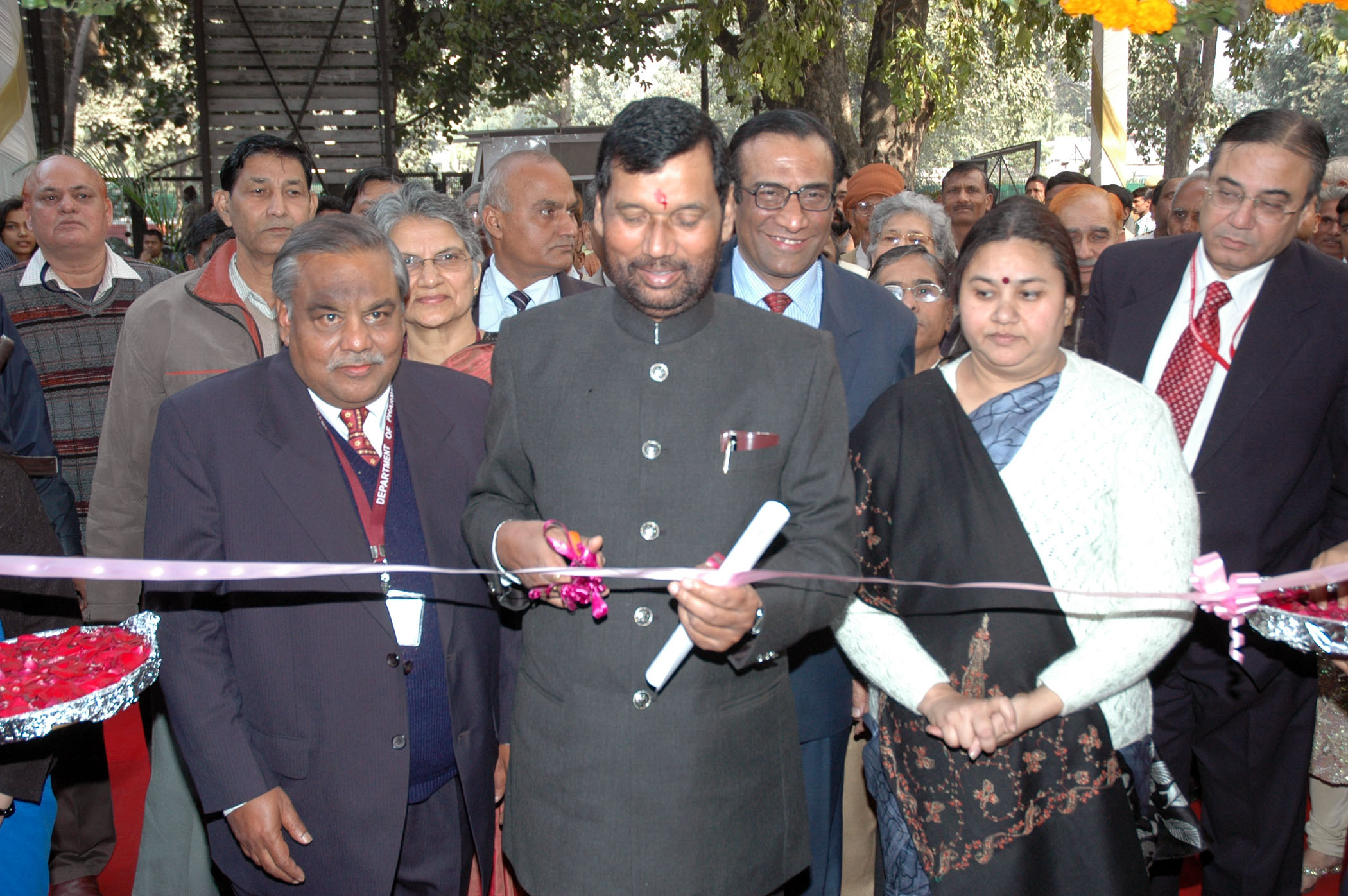
Ram Vilas Paswan inaugurating the first Jan Aushadhi drug store in New Delhi (2009)

== Timeline ==
Year	Number of Shops	Annual Sales
2008	199	Launched
2014	240	3 CR
2015–16	Re-Launched	
2015–16	540	12 CR
2016–17	960	33 CR
2017–18	3193	140 CR
2018–19	5440	315 CR
2019–20	6306	433 CR
2020–21	7557	665.83 CR
2021–22	8640	893.56 CR
2022–23	9182	1094.84 cr
2023–24	10006	1470 cr (Jun 2014)
2024-25	15032	2234 cr

- Under this scheme, There are 2210 stores in Uttar Pradesh, 1228 stores in Kerala, 1225 stores in Karnataka and 1107 stores in Tamil Nadu and 12616 stores opened across the country till June 2024 and More than 35% of shops are run by women.

== Impact and consequences ==
- In 2016, 199 medicines were sold through this scheme.
- In 2017, more than 700 generic drugs for 98 types of diseases and 164 surgical items were sold.
- In March 2018, sales of girls' sanitary napkins started under the name Suvidha.
- In 2019, 900 types of generic drugs and 154 surgical products were sold.
- By 2024, 2047 types of generic drugs and more than 300 surgical products were being sold. 5 Ayurvedic products were also added to the sale.
- Through this scheme, more than 30000 crores of public money has been saved through sales of more than 5600 crores in the last 10 years.

=== Suvidha Sanitary Napkins ===
In 2018, the "Janaushadhi Suvidha Oxo-Biodegradable Sanitary Napkin" was launched. They are available for sale at ₹1 at all PMBJP Kendras across the country. To date, 19 crore napkins have been sold.

As on 31.01.2025, The cumulative sales of Suvidha Napkins is 72 Crores.

== Benefits ==
The Jan Aushadhi initiative makes quality drugs available at affordable prices through dedicated stores. These stores sell generic medicines, available at lower prices, but equivalent to their branded counterparts in quality and efficacy. Some comparative prices of Jan Aushadi vs Sun Pharma (as of September 2025) are:

Name of Medicine	Dosage	Pack	Jan Aushadhi Price	Market Price in ₹
Tab. Atorvastatin	10 mg	10	8.25	79.63
Tab. Amoxycillin	500 mg	10	32.8	117
Tab. Pantoprazol	40 mg	10	11.35	181
Tab. Cetrizine	10 mg	10	5.16	30.00
Tab. Paracetamol	500 mg	10	6.47	09.47
Tab Finasteride	1 mg	10	14.07	151
Minoxidil 5% Topical Solution	60 ml	Liquid	150	1146

Jan aushadi also offers protein supplements for both men and women at nominal price significantly more affordable than branded counterparts.Jan aushadi supplements carry clear 'jan aushadi' label.

== Quality ==
The implementing agency, Pharmaceuticals & Medical Devices Bureau of India (PMBI), has established a multi-tier quality control mechanism for its procurement process.

=== Procurement Standards and Testing ===
The PMBI does not manufacture the products. Instead it procures it from both private and public manufacturers based on tendering process.

The PMBI mandates that all its suppliers (Both public and private companies) must be WHO-Good Manufacturing Practice (WHO-GMP) certified. Suppliers must also furnish a Certificate of Pharmaceutical Product (CoPP) for the products. The quality assurance process involves a two-stage testing protocol:

Stage 1 (Manufacturer-side): Products are first tested at the manufacturer's end. A Certificate of Analysis (CoA) from the manufacturer, confirming adherence to quality standards, must be submitted with every supply.

Stage 2 (PMBI-side): Upon receipt at PMBI warehouses, random sampling is conducted for every single batch of medicine. These samples are re-tested at PMBI's empanelled NABL (National Accreditation Board for Testing and Calibration Laboratories) accredited laboratories. The Testing follows official Pharmacopoeial references (IP/BP/USP) or the product's Standard Testing Procedure (STP). Only after validation by PMBI's Quality Control and Quality Assurance departments the batches approved are sent to temperature controlled and WHO - Good Distribution Practice certified warehouse for storage from there they will be sent to the Janaushadhi Kendras for sale to customer's.

PMBI also conducts random sampling of products already available at Janaushadhi Kendras and warehouse control samples throughout their shelf-life to ensure ongoing quality.

If a batch is declared "Not of Standard Quality" (NSQ) by the NABL labs, the PMBI recalls the entire batch from all its Kendras and warehouse. If a single batch fails quality testing, the supplier is blacklisted and no goods will be procured from the firm.

PMBI maintains a list of debarred/blacklisted suppliers and recall notices on its website, though the timeliness and relevance of this data have been questioned.

=== Quality Incidents and Criticisms ===
Despite the stated standards, the scheme has faced criticism over quality control effectiveness. In 2018, the BPPI (PMBI's previous name) recalled six batches of medicines, including painkillers and antibiotics, after state drug regulators found them substandard. Critics at the time noted the agency's reliance on state-level testing conducted after drugs were already in circulation, highlighting a lack of robust internal pre-distribution checks. Concerns about drug quality persist in the wider Indian market, impacting Jan Aushadhi products as well. Data from state drug controllers cited by CDSCO indicated 84 formulations declared NSQ across various sources. In 2024, an RTI query in Kerala found over 2% of random drug samples tested from medical stores in the state were substandard, with the failure rate slightly higher (4.2%) for samples specifically from Jan Aushadhi Kendras (though the sample size was smaller). Another common criticism relates to the taste of liquid formulations like syrups. Procurement tenders primarily specify active ingredients and packaging, often lacking detailed requirements for flavouring agents. This allows manufacturers flexibility in choosing flavours & preservatives which sometimes results in products perceived by consumers as less palatable compared to branded counterparts, potentially affecting adherence.

== Pradhan Mantri Bharatiya Janaushadhi Kendras (PMBJK) ==
Under the scheme, dedicated stores known as Pradhan Mantri Bharatiya Janaushadhi Kendras (launched as Jan Aushadhi Kendras in 2008 and later renamed to PMBJK in post-2016) were established to distribute generic drugs and surgical devices. These kendras offer medicines at prices 50–90% lower than those of branded equivalents, ensuring accessibility for low-income households.

As of 2026, over 18,000 PMBJP Kendras operate across India, supported by subsidies, training programs, and quality assurance protocols to maintain public trust in generic medicines. The scheme aligns with India’s healthcare goals of universal affordability and reducing out-of-pocket medical expenses.

== Pharmaceuticals & Medical Devices Bureau of India (PMBI) ==
The Pharmaceuticals & Medical Devices Bureau of India (PMBI), the implementing agency of Pradhan Mantri Bhartiya Janaushadhi Pariyojana (PMBJP).

It was established under the Department of Pharmaceuticals, Government of India, coordinates the procurement, supply, and marketing of generic drugs through Pradhan Mantri Bhartiya Janaushadhi Kendras (PMBJK) to ensure quality generic medicines are available at affordable prices.

== See also ==
- Generic medicine in India
- Ministry of Chemicals and Fertilizers
- Pharmaceutical industry in India
- Healthcare in India
- Ayushman Bharat Yojana
- National Health Authority
- National Pharmaceutical Pricing Authority
- Ministry of Health and Family Welfare
- List of schemes of the government of India
