= Krishak Bandhu Scheme =

Welfare scheme for Bengali farmers

The Krishak Bandhu scheme (Bengali: কৃষক বন্ধু প্রকল্প, 'Farmer Friend scheme') was launched by the West Bengal government in 2019 for the welfare of farmers. Under this scheme, maximum financial assistance of ₹10,000 is provided to the farmers in two equal installments during two periods of the year (Kharif and Rabi). In addition, the eligible farmer's family receives a one-time financial aid of ₹2 lakh in the event of his or her death. This scheme currently benefits over 90 lakh farmers in West Bengal.
