= Pradhan Mantri SVANidhi Scheme =

Government scheme in India

- Country: India
- Prime Minister(s): Narendra Modi
- Launched: 1 June 2020; 5 years ago
- Website: pmsvanidhi.mohua.gov.in

The Pradhan Mantri Street Vendor’s AtmaNirbhar Nidhi (PM SVANidhi) is a micro-credit scheme launched by the Government of India on 1 June 2020, under the Ministry of Housing and Urban Affairs (MoHUA). It aims to empower and support street vendors who were adversely affected by the COVID-19 pandemic, by providing them access to affordable working capital loans to help them revive their livelihoods.

== Benefits ==
The primary objectives of the PM SVANidhi Scheme include:

1. Financial Assistance: Providing working capital loans of up to ₹10,000 for an initial tenure of 12 months.
2. Interest Subsidy: Offering a 7% annual interest subsidy on timely or early repayment of the loan.
3. Digital Inclusion: Encouraging digital transactions among street vendors by providing cash-back incentives for using digital payment methods.
4. Capacity Building: Promoting financial literacy and digital literacy among street vendors.

== Eligibility ==
The following individuals are eligible for the PM SVANidhi Scheme:

1. Street Vendors: Any street vendor engaged in vending prior to 24 March 2020, as identified in the survey conducted by Urban Local Bodies (ULBs).
2. Identification Requirement: Possession of a Certificate of Vending or a Letter of Recommendation from the ULB or Town Vending Committee.
3. Coverage: The scheme is applicable to street vendors in both urban and peri-urban areas across India.

== Features ==
1. Loan Tenure and Amount:
  - The initial loan provided under the scheme is ₹10,000 for a 1-year period.
  - Upon successful repayment, vendors are eligible for an enhanced loan of up to ₹20,000 and subsequently ₹50,000 in the third cycle.
2. Interest Subsidy:
  - A 7% annual subsidy is credited directly into the beneficiary’s bank account.
  - The subsidy is available only for timely repayment of the loan.
3. Digital Transactions:
  - Vendors can earn cash-backs of ₹50 to ₹100 per month for conducting digital transactions using prescribed platforms such as BHIM UPI, Paytm, Google Pay, etc.
4. Implementation:
  - The scheme is implemented through a combination of ULBs, lending institutions, and digital payment aggregators.
  - A dedicated PM SVANidhi Portal facilitates registration, application, and monitoring

== See also ==
- Ministry of Housing and Urban Affairs
- Street Vendors (Protection of Livelihood and Regulation of Street Vending) Act, 2014
