= Deen Dayal Mobile Health Clinic =

Deen Dayal Mobile Health Clinic is a program in Madhya Pradesh, India that uses mobile health clinics to provide medical care to rural and disadvantaged populations.

Each van is GPS-enabled and is staffed with a doctor, nurse, lab attendant and pharmacist. The vans, or Mobile Medical Units (MMUs), were operational in 1998 under the name Jeewan Jyoti Yojana, although the program relaunched in 2006 under its current name

Dr. Jyotirmoy Roy was first incharge and Project Devoloper of MHU NRHM Dr. Jyotirmoy Roy was the First' MO of MHU .
