= Pradhan Mantri Vishwakarma Kaushal Samman Yojana =

Welfare scheme

Pradhan Mantri Vishwakarma Kaushal Samman Yojana (PMVKSY)
- Country: India
- Prime Minister(s): Narendra Modi
- Ministry: MSME
- Launched: 17 September 2023; 2 years ago Coimbatore
- Status: Active
- Website: pmvishwakarma.gov.in

Pradhan Mantri Vishwakarma Kaushal Samman Yojana (PMVKSY, transl. Prime Minister's Artisan Skill Honoring Scheme) was launched by Ministry of Micro, Small and Medium Enterprises on 17 September 2023 to provide end-to-end support to artisans and craftspeople who work with their hands and tools.

== Overview ==
It was proposed to support more than 3 million families through the scheme with a budgetary allocation of ₹130 billion (US$1.4 billion) between 2023-24 and 2027-28. In the first year of its launch, 2.1 million applications were submitted. As of 3 November 2024, a total of 25.8 million applications have been submitted, of which 2.37 million applicants have successfully registered after undergoing the required verification process.

In February 2025, the Tamil Nadu government refused to implement the scheme marking it as ineffective. Later, they proposed an inclusive artisan support scheme.

== Features ==
The scheme provides two training levels both with a ₹500 daily stipend. It further supports artisans with up to ₹15,000 in tool kit e-vouchers, and comprehensive marketing assistance from the National Committee for Marketing (NCM), covering all the required documentation. Moreover, It offers collateral-free business development loans with an interest rate of 5%.
