= Pooled Finance Development Fund Scheme =

Indian government programme

- Country: India

The Pooled Finance Development Fund Scheme (PFDF) has been set up by the Central Government of India. The main aim of the Government authorities is to provide credit enhancement facilities to Urban Local Bodies (ULBs) based on their credit worthiness. This will enable them to access market borrowings through state-level pooled mechanism. PFDF is to ensure availability of resources to Urban Local Bodies in order to improve urban infrastructure and ultimately attain the goal of self-sustainability.

== Background ==
The growth rates in India that are reflected each financial year are largely driven by the growth in the urban areas and cities. The rural sector in India has limited potential, being majorly dependent on agriculture. Also, the continuous decline observed in the national poverty levels are being determined largely on the basis of urban cities. The Urban Local Bodies are responsible for undertaking majority of the urban infrastructure development projects. They are largely dependent on the funds provided by either the state governments or the local agencies. The poor administration in these local bodies pose a hurdle in financing such projects. They are unable to raise resources from the market/financial institutions for investment in infrastructural projects. In spite of the existing programmes of both the central and the state governments was a continuous gap between the availability and extent of requirements of funds for such projects, more commonly found in small and medium-sized cities. The Government thus, realized the need to provide direct access to capital markets for such cities. In order to make the local bodies self-sufficient and to ensure availability of resources at all times, the Government introduced the Pooled Finance Development Fund Scheme.

== Objectives of PFDF ==
1. Decentralization of economic growth and power.
2. Improving infrastructural facilities and creating durable public assets in cities.
3. Promoting resource generated schemes for Urban Local Bodies to improve overall financial scenario.

== Guidelines for SPFEs ==
1. Facilitate Urban Local Bodies to access capital and financial market for investment in essential municipal infrastructure.
2. Reduce the cost of borrowing to local bodies with appropriate credit enhancement measures and through restructuring of existing costly debts.
3. Facilitate development of Municipal Bond market.
4. Facilitate the development of bankable urban infrastructural projects.
5. Responsibilities of SPFEs
6. Work in close collaboration and co-operation with the Municipalities/Urban Local bodies in urban infrastructural development projects.
7. Select projects based on viability and priority.
8. Get appraisal for the projects by recognized credit rating agencies i order to attract larger investment.
9. Mobilise resources by means of issuing bonds and redirecting funds for investment in projects.
10. Purchase bonds of ULBs or provide sub-loans to them.
11. Set up and manage Credit Rating Enhancement Fund (CREF).
12. Sign appropriate agreements with the Central Government and ULBs/Municipality.
13. Prepare projects that are technically and financially stable and in tune with environmental norms.
