= Free laptop distribution scheme of the Uttar Pradesh government =

Government initiative in Uttar Pradesh, India

Free Laptop Distribution Scheme
- Type of project: Government
- Products: Laptop
- Country: India
- State: Uttar Pradesh
- Chief Minister: Akhilesh Yadav
- Launched: 2012
- Closed: 2014
- Budget: ₹2,800 crore (US$330 million)
- Status: Inactive

The free laptop distribution scheme (मुफ्त लैपटॉप वितरण योजना) is an initiative of the Government of Uttar Pradesh headed by Akhilesh Singh Yadav of Samajwadi Party to provide ₹100,000 (US$1,200) for laptops and computer tablets to the students in the state who pass the high school and intermediate examinations to encourage them for higher studies. A total of 1,500,000 laptops have been distributed by the Government of Uttar Pradesh between 2012 and 2015, making it one of the largest distribution scheme ever imitation by any government in the world.

== History ==
This scheme was first introduced by Samajwadi Party in its 2012 Assembly Election manifesto to give free laptops and tablet computers to intermediate and high-school pass outs of 2012 by Akhilesh Yadav. After becoming the Chief Minister of Uttar Pradesh, he distributed 1,500,000 laptops under this scheme in first three years of his administration. In 2015 the government announced to gift free laptops to toppers of each district in Uttar Pradesh. A total of 625 high school class and 425 intermediate toppers of session 2014–2015 will be benefitted. An independent RTI highlighted discrepancies between the purchased laptops and the laptops distributed, pointing to potential corruption. The RTI reply stated that between 2012 and 2014, the government had purchased a total of 14,81,118 laptops (2012-13 -- 9,989 laptops and in 2013-14 -- 14,71,129 laptops). In 2014-15, no laptops were purchased. However, only 6,11,794 laptops were distributed among students.

== Purpose and Benefits of the Scheme ==
Uttar Pradesh Government's free laptop scheme was aimed at bridging the digital divide and empowering the youths of the state. The students who were lagging behind due to lack of resources benefited under this scheme.

The beneficiaries as per the decision taken by the state cabinet were students who passed 10th and 12th exams conducted by the following bodies.

- Uttar Pradesh Secondary Education Board
- CBSE, ICSE and ISC
- Poorva Madhyama and Madhyama of Sanskrit Education Board
- Munshi/Maulvi and Alim of Madrasa Board
- Recognized ITI and Polytechnics

20% quota for minorities and 21% for SC/CT students was also made in the final Free Laptop Distribution Scheme recipients list. This scheme was considered as one of the visionary approach of socialist government to provide an equal opportunity and to remove discrimination. Youth activist Ravi Nitesh views it as an effort where students in Uttar Pradesh received laptop at a time when many youths were not even able to see a computer. It is believed that through these laptop distribution, students would receive inspiration towards higher education and interest in studies with easiness of resource materials in soft copies and editing of their notes at a time when in India, enrolment in higher education (around 25%) was much lower than many countries (China 43%, USA 85%) and hence there was a strong need to frame policies that may encourage students to study, develop interest and understanding and getting enrolled for higher education.

== Configuration Details ==
The configuration details of the laptops provided by Hewlett-Packard(HP)

Sr. No	Particulars	Description
1	Construction and Externals	Metal/ Alloy/ Reinforced hinges for display. The casing ABS plastic of Black or Gray Color Display screen back with Government Approved Logo
2	Processor	Latest Generation 64 bit multicore X86 Intel Pentium or equivalent AMD processor
3	Memory	2 GB DDR 1333 MHz RAM expandable to 4 GB
4	Display	LED HD 14" with 1366x768 resolution or higher
5	Hard Disk Drive	500 GB SATA 5400 RPM or Higher
6	Audio	Dual In-built Speakers
7	Web Cam	Yes
8	Qualifying Benchmark	BAPCO Sysmark 2007 overall score of 112 or Higher with Windows 7 Professional and 2 GB Memory
9	Graphics Card	Integrated Graphics Minimum 128 MB VRAM or higher
10	Ports	I/O ports, Minimum 3 USB 2.0 ports, Microphone Jack, 1 VGA, 1 HDMI, Headphone/ Speaker out, RJ-45, AC Power
11	LAN	Ethernet Controller 10/100 Mbps or higher
12	Wireless	Wireless 802.11 q/b/g or higher and standard Bluetooth
13	Keyboard	Standard Full size keyboard with touch pad
14	Operating System	Preloaded Dual Boot – Primary boot : Windows 7 Starter with Antivirus, Secondary Boot : Linux/Ubuntu
15	Optical Drive	DVD R/W
16	AC Power Adapter	Input Voltage Range : 110–250 V, 50 Hz with necessary cables
17	Standard Accessories	Power Cable, Power Adapter and Charger, User Manual, Backpack etc.
18	Operation Temperature	0–55 °C
19	Battery Type	Standard Re-chargeable 6 Cell Li-Ion ( 45 WHr ) with min 3 Hrs backup
