= Shaadi Bhagya scheme =

Shaadi Bhagya Scheme (Kannada: ಶಾದಿ ಭಾಗ್ಯ) is a Government of Karnataka scheme to provide financial assistance for the financially backward minority (Muslim, Christian, Sikh, Parsi etc.) women (refer govt of karnataka website for exact details and eligibility). This scheme was launched in October 2013 from the Indian National Congress Government led by Siddaramaiah. This scheme was a promised in state budget presented in July 2013.

== Eligibility criteria ==
The age of bride should be 18 or more and the groom 21, the annual income of the woman seeking the benefit should be less than Rs 1.5 lakh. Even though this would be only a one-time assistance, divorcees and widows intending to marry again passing above criteria can also avail this plan.

== Opposition ==
Opposition parties criticized the plan as an appeasement tactic to please Muslim votes for the forthcoming 2014 Indian general election. Opposing this plan Karnataka Janata Paksha led by B. S. Yeddyurappa launched an indefinite satyagraha for the extension of this plan to all financially backward sections irrespective of religious background.

== See also ==
- Siddaramaiah
- B. S. Yeddyurappa
