= India and the World Bank =

Cooperation between the World Bank and India

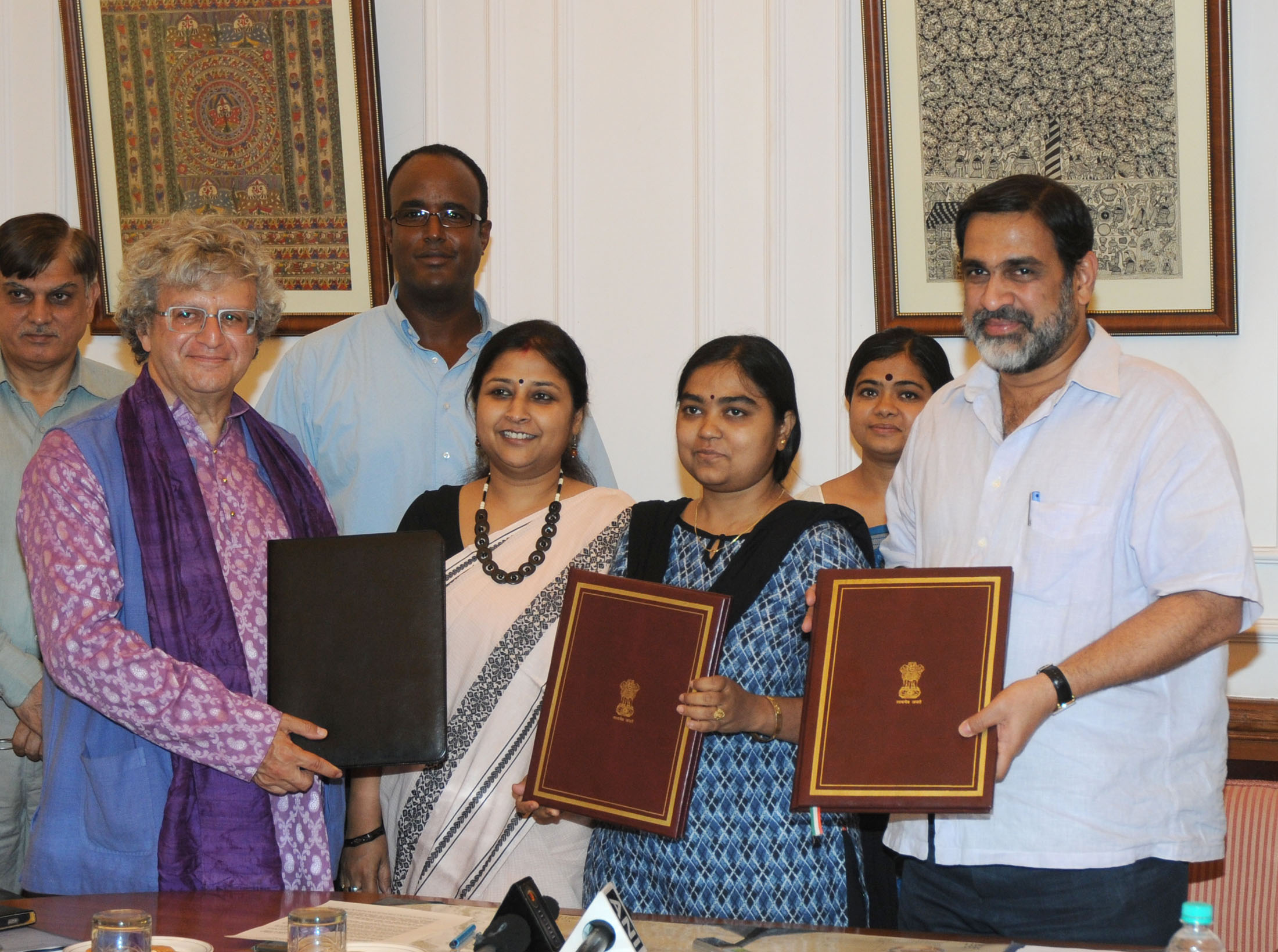
The Joint Secretary, Department of Economic Affairs, Ministry of Finance, Venu Rajamony, the State Project Director, Rajasthan, Mrs. Poonam and the Country Director India, World Bank

The cooperation between the World Bank and India goes back to the foundation of the International Bank of Reconstruction and Development (IBRD) in 1944. As one of 44 countries, India prepared the agenda for the Bretton Woods Conference in June 1944. The Indian delegation was led by Sir Jeremy Raisman, who was a finance member of the Indian government and proposed the name "International Bank for Reconstruction and Development". India received its first bank loan of US$34million from the IBRD in November 1948 for railway rehabilitation. Since then, India has become the country with the largest country program and its lending portfolio of the World Bank group inheres of 104 operations with a total volume of $27.1 billion. Parameswaran Iyer is the present executive director of World Bank nominated by India.

== Economy of India ==
India is one of the fastest growing countries in the world. According to the annual report of the IMF, India shows a GDP growth rate of 7.3% for 2018. India is the third largest country in purchasing power parity and is expected to keep their annual growth rate. India was able to lift 133 million people out of poverty between 1994 and 2012. Still, with a population of 1.3 billion people, India shows 5% of its population living in extreme poverty. In June 2018, India experienced a current account deficit of US$15.8 billion that represents the highest deficit within the last five years. India exported US$261billion in 2016, which makes it the 17th largest export country in the world. However, India's export structure is still not really diversified and is primarily focused on commodity and primary goods. Diamonds and jewelry and packaged medications accounted for around 20% of the export sector.

== Projects and Alliances ==
=== Country Partnership Framework for India ===
The World Bank lends around US$27.1 billion to India, which makes it the largest country of IBRD support. In September 2018, the World Bank Group began a new partnership with India. The partnership emphasizes an efficient and sustainable growth path and fosters competitiveness to create new job opportunities and investments in human capital. It is embedded in the Sustainable Development Goals of the United Nations and focuses on strengthening of public-sector institutions in order to create strong governance. The country partnership framework between the World Bank and India is the largest country partnership framework in the World Bank Group and it supports India's transition to a middle-income country.

=== Education ===
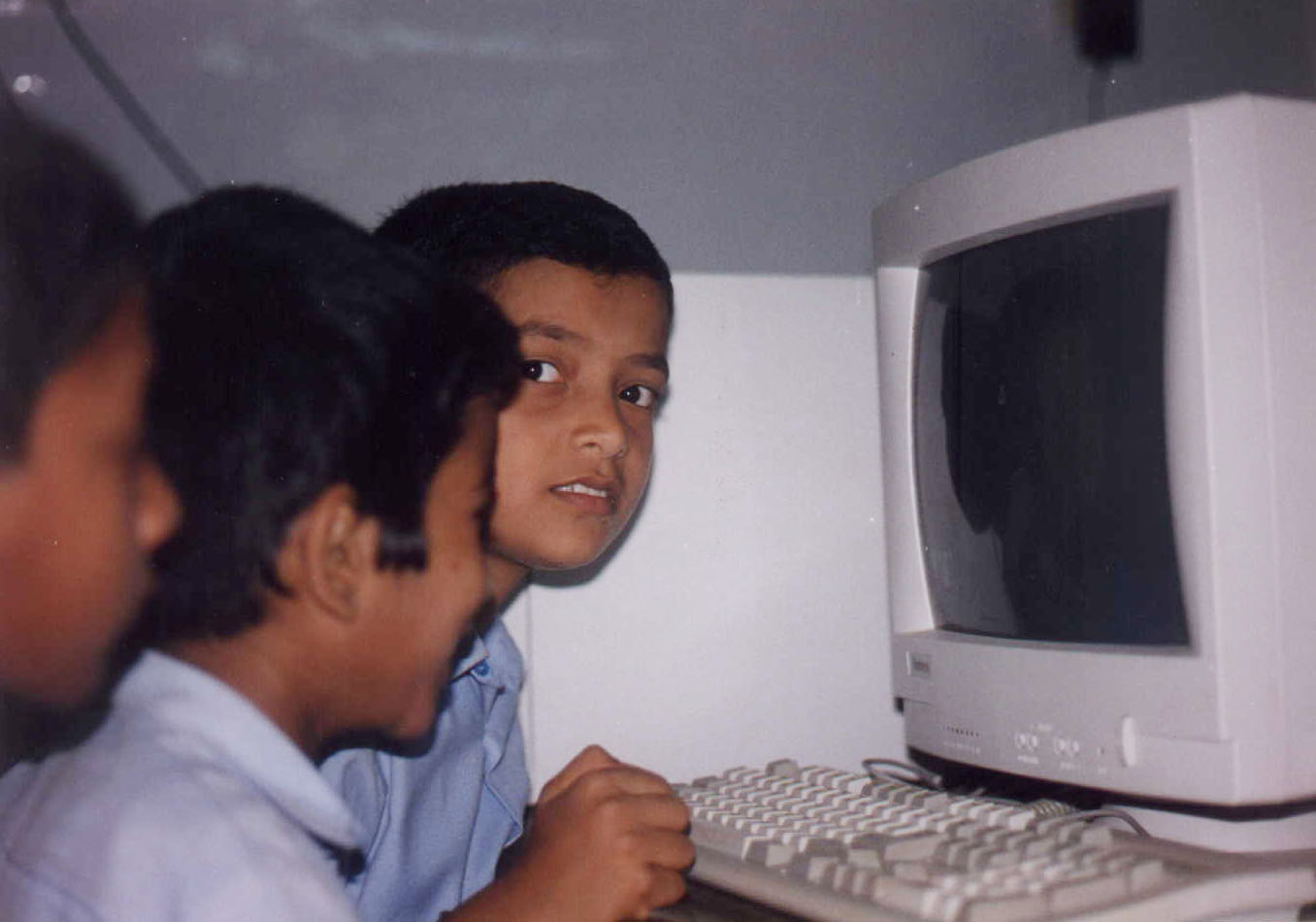
School boys learning computers in Goa, India

==== Sarva Shiksha Abhiyan (SSA) ====
The Sarva Shiksha Abhiyan is a government program which was first issued in 2001. The program aimed to provide elementary education for around 200 million children across the country. The program is supported by the World Bank, the European Commission and the United Kingdom DFID, but is governmental led. During the first phase in 2001 - 2003, the World Bank contributed US$500 million, before the World Bank increased its contribution in a second phase by additional US$600 million. In 2009, India passed its Right of Children to Free and Compulsory Education Act that mandated elementary education as a fundamental right. The number of out-of-school children declined in India by 29.1 million from 2001 to 2013 and the number of children in elementary education increased steadily to 200 million. In 2012, 95 percent of the children had access to primary education. The Indian government and the World Bank agreed on a new credit agreement with a total volume of US$1006 million to support and finance SSA III. The program focuses on improving quality and developing learning indicators by the National Council for Education Research and Training in order to evaluate children's progress in acquiring educational knowledge. A recent survey conducted by the National Statistical Office (NSO) revealed that the literacy rate among individuals aged seven years and older in the country was recorded at 77.7 percent from July 2017 to June 2018.

=== Infrastructure ===
==== The Pradhan Mantri Gram Sadak Yojana Project ====
The Pradhan Mantri Gram Sadak Yojana aims to connect unconnected habitations with all-weather roads. Key to the program is an all-weather access to the respective roads.

The program was first set into place in December 2000 and has connected more than 80% of communities in the country. The program was launched by then minister Atal Behari Vajpayee and is under the control of the ministry of rural development. To guarantee proper execution of the program, three management mechanisms have been put in place. Therefore, the program emphasizes in house quality control, a structured independent quality monitoring and independent national quality monitors which are arranged by the National Rural Roads Development Agency to inspect the progress and provide guidance to the local authorities. The World Bank initially started to finance the program in 2004. The World Bank Group agreed on an additional US$500million loan to finance the PMGSY in May 2018 and now has invested US$1.8billion into the program. The program has converted around 35,000 km of rural roads to all-weather roads to the benefit of 8 million people.

=== Uttarakhand Health Systems Development Project ===
The Uttarakhand Health Systems Development Project (UKHSDP) is a project intended to be implemented over a period of six years, beginning with its approval by the World Bank in 2017 and ending with an expected completion date of September 2023. The UKHSDP was issued through the International Development Association (IDA) in conjunction with the Department of Medical Health and Family Welfare of the government of Uttarakhand. The goal of the project is to "support Uttarakhand in improving the access to and quality of health services, and providing health financial risk protection" and the project has a total project cost of US$125 million, US$100 million of which was awarded by the World Bank. The remaining US$25 million was funded by the local government.

The need for the project stems from unequal access to quality health care, which is impeded by the size and distribution of settlements paired with the region's topography. The Uttarakhand region is a very hilly, mountainous region that sees a population spread out between major cities with a density of more than 500 people per square kilometer to rural areas with less than 50 people per square kilometer. The UKHSDP notes that there is a deep employment asymmetry among its most rural areas with 48% vacancies in its listings for medical officers and 75% vacancies for medical specialists.

The project has two component areas: innovations in the private sector and stewardship and system improvement. The first component focuses on a logistical fix to the current healthcare system and builds off a previously completed IDA project from 2008. The goal is to hire outside contractors in multiple areas to help with contract management and other system-wide logistical support positions. The system as a whole would improve the supply chain, multi-sectoral communication, data management, and information systems implementation. The second component address the direct action part of their original issue of getting health professionals to rural areas and has three subcategories: mobile specialty units, integration of Public-Private partnership (PPP) centers, and expanding the RSBY health coverage to adolescent primary care and care for the poor affected with Noncommunicable diseases (NCD's).

As of October 1, 2019 the project's Project Development Objectives (PDO) and Overall Implementation Progress (IP) has been moderately satisfactory, an improvement from its prior rating of moderately unsatisfactory.

=== Tamil Nadu Health System Reform Program ===
The Tamil Nadu Health System Reform Program is a relatively new project having been approved in March 2019. If all goes as planned the expected closing date for the reform project would be May 2024. A large scale project in size, the cost estimated for the total project is US$5.515 billion. The contribution by the World bank to the project is US$287 million. Currently as the project stands, it seeks to expand on a project the Tamil Nadu government just completed with the World bank in 2015. This previous project, known as the "Tamil Nadu Health Additional Financing project" sought to extend financing for a project started in 2004 called the Tamil Nadu Health Systems project. This project established the goals to fix many of the system wide issues the region was facing. The original goal was to improve healthcare sector effectiveness and efficiency in providing aid to many of the poor and underrepresented groups.

The current project looks to pick up where Tamil Nadu Health systems project left off by addressing a complex agenda for health care service delivery. While the previous project sought to establish networks and better system wide execution of healthcare and its surveillance ability, the current project takes a results based approach in the hopes of directly influencing three areas of growth; 1)Quality of care 2)non-communicable diseases (NCDs) and injury and 3)equity of healthcare access. These three categories highlight needs in the greater Tamil Nadu providence for healthcare reform to help bring the state to a more modern healthcare environment. Implementation of these categorical objectives are hoped to be realized through facility accreditation and procedures to ensure healthcare quality consistency, better quality of care towards trauma, mental health, and NCDs, and improved access for geographically disadvantaged and well as financially disadvantaged.

The program notes deficiencies in current healthcare equity by showing large ranges in percentage by cities that have access to contraceptives as well as vaccinations. The program sites NCDs as a rapidly prevailing issue in the state due to the changing of the demographic within it. As the population continues to shift towards an aging population the prevalence of NCDs like hypertension, cardiovascular disease, and cancer become evermore concerning, especially in regards to access to healthcare treatment for these diseases across the state as a whole.

Currently as it stands, only US$720,000 has been disbursed on the project and much of the initial reporting is waiting on board to be generated by the government to oversee reporting numbers.
