= Amma Odi & KCR Kit =

Welfare program in Telangana, India

MCH Kit Scheme
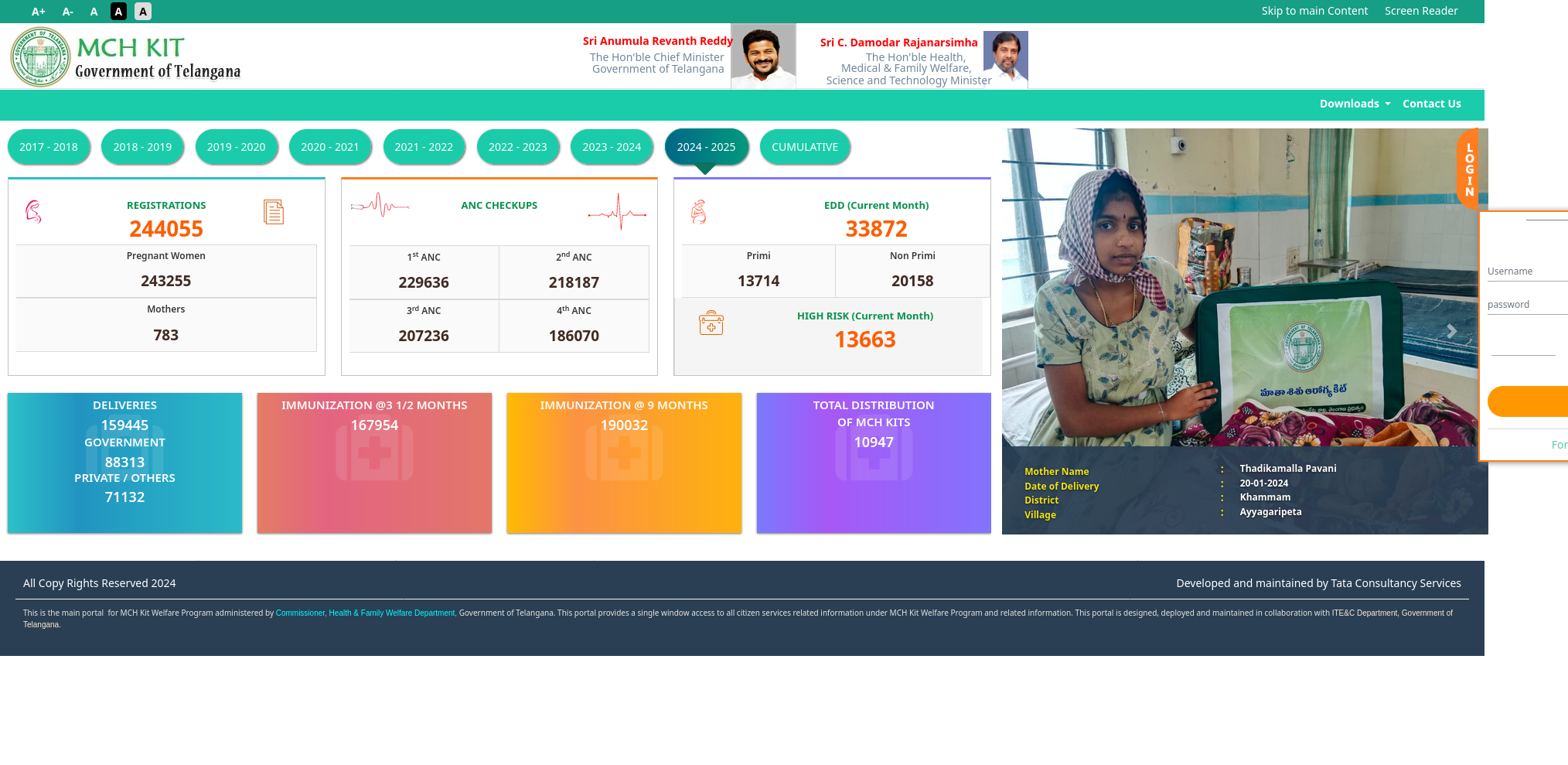
- Type of project: Mother and Child protection
- Location: Telangana, India
- Founder: Government of Telangana
- Chief Minister: K. Chandrasekhar Rao
- Established: 3 June 2017
- Budget: ₹500 crores per year
- Status: Active
- Website: mchkit.telangana.gov.in

MCH Kit, previously known as Amma Odi and KCR Kit is a welfare program for families launched by the Government of Telangana. Amma Vodi provides transport facility for pregnant women before and after delivery. The program provides financial and medical assistance to women undergoing delivery of the child at any government hospital in the state. The program aims to reduce the Infant Mortality Rate and Maternal Mortality Rate which currently stands at 28 deaths per 1000 and 65 deaths per 1 Lakh deliveries respectively. The Aadhar-based Mother and Child Tracking System (MCTS) software, is used by healthcare workers to track women at every stage of pregnancy.

== History ==
The flagship scheme was launched on 2 June 2017 by the Chief Minister of Telangana, Kalvakuntla Chandrashekar Rao, with an aim to improve the health of new born child and mother. The government earmarked Rupees 605 crores in 2017 budget.

== Scheme ==
=== KCR Kit ===
The mother upon delivery is provided with a KCR Kit consisting of 16 items necessary to keep newborn babies (neonates) warm and hygienic. They are sufficient for three months. The items include: clothes, quality baby soaps, baby oil, baby powder, mosquito nets, toys, napkins, and diapers.

=== Amma Odi ===
The scheme was launched after the success of KCR Kit by Chief Minister of Telangana, K Chandrashekhar Rao on 18 January 2018. An exclusive, 102 call number is used for this service.

For pregnant woman across the state. Under the scheme, a pregnant woman can use free 102 service van to visit the hospital and dropped off at no cost. It can be used any number of times as necessary. After the delivery, the mother along with the new born are dropped at home after discharge from that hospital.

Presently, there are 241 multi-utility vehicles, GPS-tracked, with capacity for 10 patients. Each district is allotted 6-8 vehicles. The call center to avail the service is based in Hyderabad and works 8 AM to 8 PM everyday, 365 days. By the end of 2018 another 200 vehicles will be added to the existing 241.

==== Financial assistance ====
The mother will also be provided with financial assistance of ₹12,000 (₹13,000 for a girl child) to compensate for the loss of work by the women during the pregnancy and post natal period. This amount will be provided in installment with the last two installments paid after vaccinating the child. The money is sent as direct cash transfer to individual aadhaar-lined accounts of pregnant women in the State

=== Eligibility ===
The scheme is eligible for women who give birth at government hospitals, for a maximum of two deliveries.

== Allegation of corruption ==
An investigation done by a Telugu news channel NTV found fraudulent entries of births in the government hospital in Manopadu Mandal. These births actually took place at private hospitals but fraudulently recorded as births at government hospitals to steal the funds allocated by the government.

The scheme was not extended to births at private hospitals.
