= Madhya Pradesh Rural Livelihoods Project =

Poverty alleviation project in Madhya Pradesh, India

The Madhya Pradesh Rural Livelihoods Project (MPRLP) works with local village assemblies, Gram Sabha, to facilitate and guide community-driven collective and individual action to reduce poverty in the state of Madhya Pradesh, India.

== Background ==
The MPRLP is registered by the Madhya Pradesh Society for Rural Livelihood Promotion under the Madhya Pradesh Societies Registration Act and led by the Minister for Panchayat and Rural Development. MPRLP works within the framework of Panchayat Raj, the decentralised form of government in which each village is responsible for its own affairs. The Project reaches two million deprived people in nine mainly tribal districts of Madhya Pradesh: Barwani, Dhar, Jhabua, Alirajpur, Mandla, Dindori, Anuppur, Shadol and Sheopur.

The MPRLP is funded by the UK Department of International Development. Phase I from June 2004 – June 2007 cost £16.49 million (Rs114.9 crore) and covered 822 villages. Phase 2, July 2007 – July 2012, will cover 2,901 villages at a cost of £45 million (Rs357 crore). The MPRLP is one of three major programmes in DFID's rural livelihoods portfolio in India.

== Strengthening the role of the Gram Sabhas ==
MPRLP works with Gram Sabhas (village assemblies, Gram Sabha) to mainstream what they do into rural development. MPRLP also brings in experienced NGOs to help the project strengthen Gram Sabhas and develop village plans for purposes decided by their communities. The project transfers funds to the Gram Kosh. Gram Sabhas learn to plan and manage rural development equitably and transparently, and to become accountable to communities. Deprived households learn about their entitlements and how taking part in Gram Sabhas can help them access these entitlements. The proportion of village funds, Gram Kosh, targeted to the poor is now two-thirds, with over a third being targeted at women.

== Making financing affordable ==
MPRLP works with Gram Sabhas to bring affordable financial services to the poorest rural villages. Being able to save, borrow, take out insurance and transfer money inexpensively helps the poor to weather difficulties. MPRLP helps self-help groups, cooperatives and Gram Sabhas extend different types of financial services to very remote areas. Project micro-finance institutions cover 1200 families in Jhabua District, 1621 self-help groups have access to Rs3 million and nearly 100,000 families are covered by some kind of insurance. By August 2010, Gram Sabhas had loaned Rs73.44 million to self-help groups and Rs720.51 to individuals.

== Nurturing microenterprise ==
In India, small, labour-intensive enterprises rank second (after agriculture) in providing jobs. MPRLP works with Gram Sabhas to encourage microenterprises. These small businesses diversify rural economies, make use of local skills, create employment and improve the income of the poor, particularly women. MPRLP channels support through Gram Kosh, or village accounts, into 'revolving funds', from which individuals, livelihood-promotion groups and self-help groups can borrow to launch or develop small businesses. MPRLP has multi-skilled teams that help rural entrepreneurs acquire technical and business skills, particularly focusing on local markets, service-based enterprises and business clusters. As part of its work, MPRLP has developed 22 local markets (known as haat bazaars) and these provide a place for people to sell their products.

== Gender ==
MPRLP works with communities and Gram Sabhas to create an understanding that gender concerns both women and men. This means giving equal opportunities (equality) and encouraging fair treatment according to people's needs (equity). Depending on circumstances, MPRLP focuses on activities either for women only, or for women and men.

MPRLP works closely with Gram Sabhas to design financial policies that target poor and destitute women and self-help groups. Training courses in skills such as growing vegetables, tailoring and poultry rearing, and in forming and organising self-help groups, help women start small individual and group enterprises. Self-help groups support their members, and enable them to save small amounts regularly and address issues such as nutrition, health and education. MPRLP also runs leadership development courses to empower women from less well represented socio-economic groups.

== Social protection ==
MPRLP's approach to social protection is to make the poor aware of entitlements under existing government schemes and, at the same time, encourage Gram Sabhas to direct more resources to the poorest. MPRLP works through Gram Sabhas to improve people's understanding of their entitlements and help them access benefits such as old-age and widows’ pensions and food subsidies. MPRLP also encourages Gram Sabhas to identify the poor and take their needs into consideration when developing village micro-plans and deciding who should get grants from Gram Kosh funds.

== Aligning with other rural development programmes ==
The Government of India is investing huge amounts in rural development, agriculture and animal husbandry schemes, as is the Government of Madhya Pradesh. MPRLP aligns with partners, agencies and government programmes, such as the National Rural Employment Guarantee (NREG) Act and the Agriculture Extension Reforms Scheme), (implemented by the Agriculture Technology Management Agency which have similar goals, a similar understanding of the issues and similar ways of solving problems. The aim is to improve the delivery of rural development programmes through integrated plans, budgets and approaches that link with government schemes.

Under NREG villagers are digging wells, constructing irrigation channels, planting trees and building soil and water conservation structures. Hundreds of thousands of agroforestry trees planted on bunds between fields provide fruit, animal food and fuel as well as conserving soil and soil moisture, and reducing pressure on forests. MPRLP works with Joint Forest Management committees at the village level to support forest protection and afforestation on common and degraded land.

== Boosting agriculture ==
Demand for fresh vegetables in India's rapidly expanding towns and cities is growing. MPRLP and the Madhya Pradesh Department of Farmer Welfare and Agriculture Development work with Gram Sabhas to distribute improved vegetable seed starter kits, provide training and help farmers form cooperatives so that they can take advantage of this growth in demand. MPRLP also introduces farmers to the System of Rice Intensification which enables them to substantially increase paddy yields, showing farmers how to grow a follow-on crop during the dry fallow season rather than leaving the ground bare. This means they can harvest two crops a year instead of one. Training in seed production and helping cooperatives become registered and certified, gives farmers in remote areas access to quality seed of wheat, soy, bean and gram. This, as well as organic farming (for which training is given) gives them access to high-value markets.

== Improving livestock-keeping ==
Livestock is an important part of poor people's livelihoods in remote areas of Madhya Pradesh. MPRLP helps these people keep their animals healthy and produce more by working with Gram Sabhas to provide private services and advice on animal husbandry. Some of the poor, especially women, start small but profitable enterprises such as fish and poultry rearing.

== Making biogas work for poor communities ==
Most people in rural India use dried cow dung and wood gathered from forests as fuel for cooking. But these fuels are smoky and may cause serious lung and eye diseases. Collecting dung and firewood takes a great deal of time. MPRLP helps villagers draw on government funds to build their own biogas plants. This simple technology traps the methane produced by cow dung during anaerobic breakdown and provides gas for cooking as well as a nutrient-rich slurry that makes an excellent manure. MPRLP works with Gram Sabhas to get buy-in from villagers, to help them take advantage of government subsidies and to set up repair services to make sure the gas plants can be fixed if they go wrong. By the end of 2010, around 5000 family-size biogas plants had been built in 800 villages.

== Bringing light to remote communities ==
Rural households in remote areas do not have electricity. They use kerosene lamps which are a fire hazard, provide poor light and emit fumes that cause respiratory problems. MPRLP has been working with the government agency, the Madhya Pradesh Urja Vikas Nigam (MPUVN) to provide solar lighting to project villages in the remote Sheopur District. MPRLP works with Gram Sabhas to explain the benefits of solar lighting to villagers and encourage them to take part in the Government of India's Ministry of New and Renewable Energy (MRNE) scheme through MPUVN. As of August 2010, solar lights had been installed through the MPUVN under the MRNE scheme in 1279 households in 13 villages at a cost of Rs11,750 per household. For every ten households covered by the programme, a street light was also installed.

Solar lights mean that people can work and socialise during the evenings. Women can cook safely, children can study and village meetings can be held.

== Adapting to climate change and promoting low-carbon development ==
MPRLP was not set up to help adapt to or mitigate climate change, but the programme's holistic approach has helped poor, vulnerable communities adapt and build resilience to the adverse effects of climate change. MPRLP acts as a facilitator for a large number of community-led initiatives such as biogas, smokeless cooking stoves, manual irrigation pumps, solar lighting and agroforestry that address vulnerabilities to climate change. Biogas plants reduce carbon emissions and cut down the use of kerosene and non-renewable biomass for cooking. Smokeless cooking stoves reduce the amount of wood burned. Hand pumps lessen emissions from the diesel pumps that would otherwise be used. Solar lighting cuts down the use of carbon-emitting kerosene lamps. Agroforestry plantations of 10 million trees absorb carbon dioxide as well as providing fruit, timber and animal fodder. Helping rural entrepreneurs, especially the landless, set up enterprises such as making beads and toys lessens the impact of any changes in climate. Insurance schemes, social protection schemes and grain banks see farmers through difficult periods. MPRLP also provides migrant families with information on out-migration and their legal entitlements.

== See also ==
- Department for International Development
- District Rural Development Agencies (India)
- History of panchayati raj in India
- Indian Societies Registration Act
- Panchayati raj

== Publications ==
- MPRLP Update Series No. 1 Role of the Gram Sabha
- MPRLP Update Series No. 2 Boosting agriculture
- MPRLP Update Series No. 3 Better livestock-keeping
- MPRLP Update Series No. 4 Nurturing microenterprise
- MPRLP Update Series No. 5 Solar lighting
- MPRLP Update Series No. 9 Microfinance
- MPRLP Update Series No. 10 Programme convergence
- MPRLP Update Series No. 11 Biogas
- MPRLP Update Series No. 12 Climate change
- Transforming Rural Livelihoods in India (DFID) (PDF)
