= National Child Labour Projects =

Indian government initiative

The National Child Labour Project (NCLP) Scheme is as an initiative by the Ministry of Labour and Employment of India. The Government of India launched it in 1988 to rehabilitate children aged 9 to 12 years. The project has expanded to cover 312 districts in 21 states. The identified children are withdrawn from the hazardous work and provided with the facilities such as non-formal education, vocational training, midday meal, a stipend of Rs.150/- per child per month, and healthcare through a doctor appointed for a group of 20 schools. The NCLP project since its inception in 1988 has managed to rescue around 1.2 million children who tell about how child labour escapes from the eyes of the state and managed to reproduce its presence across sectors.

Under this scheme, "District Project Societies" (DPS) are set up at the district level. Under the chairmanship of the District Collector or District Magistrate, the DPS oversee the implementation of the project. It focuses on raising awareness among stakeholders and target communities, orientation of NCLP and other functionaries on the issues of child labor, and creation of a child labour monitoring, tracking and reporting System.

The budget of the NCLP covers grants-in-aid to voluntary agencies and reimbursement of assistance to bonded labour. As such, the allocation from the Union Budget to the project appears as of 2022 to be inadequate to maintain even fixed expenditure. The child protection committee of the state government of Tamil Nadu, where there are 4,314 children rescued from child labour in the program, said that over the past two years (2020-2021), there has been no financial support from the Union government to this project, leading to an uncertain future for the children who were undergoing skill development training. Submissions from NCLP shows that fund allocations towards the scheme dropped from Rs.90 crore in 2018-19 to just over Rs.41 crore in 2020-21.
