= Sabla (India) =

Indian government program

The Rajiv Gandhi Scheme for Empowerment of Adolescent Girls (RGSEAG) Sabla is a centrally sponsored program of the Government of India initiated on 1 April 2011 under the Ministry of Women and Child Development.

== Objective ==
The objectives of the program are:

- To enable adolescent girls' self-development and empowerment
- Improve their nutrition and health status
- Promote awareness about health, hygiene, nutrition, adolescent reproductive and sexual health (ARSH) and family and child care
- Upgrade home-based skills, life skills and integrate with the National Skill Development Program (NSDP) for vocational skills
- Mainstream out of school adolescent girls into formal/non-formal education.
- Provide information/guidance about existing public services such as PHC, CHC, post office, bank, police station, etc.

== Content ==
An integrated package of services is to be provided to adolescent girls as follows:

- Nutrition provision
- Iron and folic acid (IFA) supplementation
- Health check-up and referral services
- Nutrition and health education (NHE)
- Counseling/guidance on family welfare, ARSH, child care practices and home management
- Life skills education and accessing public services
- Vocational training for girls aged 16 and above under NSDP

== Eligibility criteria ==
The program would cover adolescent girls (only covered out of school girls) 11–18 years old under all Integrated Child Development Services projects in 200 selected districts in all states and UTs in the country. The target group would be subdivided into 11-15 and 15–18 years of age.
