= Bhavantar Bhugtan Yojana =

Policy of Madhya Pradesh government

- Motto: To provide compensation to farmers for agricultural products whenever their prices fall below the announced Minimum Support Price (MSP)
- State: Government of Madhya Pradesh
- Chief Minister: Shivraj Singh
- Launched: 16 October 2017

The Bhavantar Bhugtan Yojana (price difference payment scheme) is a program of the Government of Madhya Pradesh in which the government compensates farmers for the difference between the official Minimum Support Price (MSP) and the rate at which they sell their crops, or the Model Price, whichever is higher.

The objective of the scheme is to provide compensation to farmers for agricultural products whenever their prices fall below the announced Minimum Support Price (MSP), thereby protecting them from losses incurred due to distress sales.

The scheme was launched by Chief Minister Shivraj Singh on 16 October 2017. In its first year, the state government introduced the scheme for eight crops, mainly in the oilseeds and pulses category. Later, in 2018, the scheme was extended to a total of 13 Kharif crops.
