= Vajpayee Arogyasri Yojana =

State health insurance

Vajpayee Arogyasri Yojana is the flagship health insurance scheme of Government of Karnataka, which aims to help people living Below Poverty Line (BPL) to provide medical facilities. The World Bank is funding 80 per cent of the project and the state government is funding the rest 20 per cent. The scheme provides medical facilities to BPL families of both rural area and urban area in the state of Karnataka.

The scheme covers free treatment for 402 procedures including cardiovascular disease, treatment of cancer, burn, and neonatal diseases in tertiary care hospitals. The government directly pays to the treating hospital providing cashless treatment to the patient up to a limit of INR 1.5 lakh to the family on floating basis with an additional buffer of INR 50,000 on case-to-case basis.

The scheme all the pre exciting disease form Day 1 and aims to settle the claim within 21 days of receiving the claims from the network hospital. The minimum requirement to avail the benefits under the scheme requires 24 hours hospitalization in the hospital.

A committee chaired by Deputy Commissioner oversees the Grievance Redressal Cell at the District level.
