= Eklavya Model Residential School =

Public school in India

- India

Information
- Type: Government residential school
- Established: 1997–98
- Founder: Ministry of Tribal Affairs
- Authority: Government of India
- Language: English
- Campus type: Residential

Ekalavya Model Residential School or EMRS is a model residential school for tribal people. It was established by the Tribal Ministry, Government of India.

== Tables of Milestone ==
| Year | Milestone / Policy Decision | Key Outcome & Significance |
|---|---|---|
| 1997-98 | Launch of the Scheme | The EMRS scheme was initiated by the Ministry of Tribal Affairs to provide quality residential education for Scheduled Tribe (ST) students in remote areas. |
| 2018-19 | Major Scheme Revamp | Announced in the Union Budget, the scheme was expanded with a new target: to establish an EMRS in every block with >50% ST population and at least 20,000 tribal persons. |
| 2018-19 | New Establishment Target Set | A target to establish 740 EMRSs across the country by the year 2025-26 was formally set. |
| 2022 (April) | Merger with Eklavya Model Day Boarding Schools (EMDBS) | The EMDBS scheme was merged into the EMRS scheme to streamline the delivery of quality education to tribal students. |
| 2023-24 | Progress Update | As of mid-2024, 708 schools had been sanctioned, with 405 schools becoming functional, demonstrating significant progress towards the 2025-26 goal. |
