= Mukhya Mantri Yuva Swarozgar Yojana =

Mukhya Mantri Yuva Swarozgar Yojana (lit. 'Chief Minister's Youth Self-Employment Scheme') or MMYSY is a government of Madhya Pradesh scheme under which the State Government will give bank guarantee and loan subsidy to promote entrepreneurship.
