= National Scheme on welfare of Fishermen =

Financial assistance for Indian fishermen

The National Scheme of Welfare of Fishermen is a centrally sponsored scheme that provides financial assistance to Fishermen in India. The financial assistance can be used by the beneficiaries (marine and inland fisherman) to construct houses, recreational community halls and for the installation of tube wells to get drinking water. Other than this, the scheme also involves support for Group Accident Insurance (INR 50,000 for death or permanent total disability and INR 25,000 for partial total disability) and grants to the National Federation of Fishermen’s Cooperatives Ltd. The scheme also has a savings cum relief component where fishermen are provided financial support during lean periods. The scheme was announced in 1992 and aimed to help small scale fishers.
