= Telangana Sheep Distribution scheme =

Sheep Distribution scheme
- Type of project: Animal husbandary
- Location: Telangana, India
- Founder: Government of Telangana
- Chief Minister: Kalvakuntla Chandrashekhar Rao
- Established: 20 June 2017
- Budget: ₹12,000 crores
- Status: Active

Telangana Sheep Distribution scheme is a subsidized sheep distribution scheme in Telangana State, India by the Government of Telangana. The government by March 2018 distributed 1 crore 28 lakh sheep to the beneficiaries.

== History ==
The scheme was launched on 20 June 2017 by the Chief Minister of Telangana, K. Chandrashekhar Rao. Of the ₹1.25 lakhs cost per unit, the government provides 75% of the cost and 25% is borne by the beneficiary. The sheep population in Telangana is expected to multiply to four times in two years

== The Scheme ==
The scheme was started to strengthen the rural economy through empowerment of Golla and Kurma communities in their traditional occupations. It is implemented by Telangana State Sheep and Goat Development Cooperative Federation (TSSGDCF). The sheep are purchased from other states, in order to avoid recycling and increase the net population in the state. The sheep breeds chosen are Nellore Brown (Dora), Nellore Jodipi (white with black spots on face), Deccani and Madras Red.

=== Eligibility ===
It is launched to support the traditional shepherd community, the Kurumas and Yadavas in Telangana. Every person aged above 18 years from shepherd community eligible for the scheme and is given a unit of sheet, which has 20 sheep and a ram.

By March 2018, 1 crore 28 lakh sheep were distributed, to over two lakh members of 7.61 lakh eligible persons submitted their applications for the sheep units.

=== Mobile veterinary units ===
The government started mobile veterinary units to attend to sickness and treatment of animals for the scheme. The toll free number is 1962.

=== Insurance ===
The shepherd Farmer receives insurance in case of a death by the government; ₹5,000 for a sheep and ₹7,000 for a ram.

=== Fodder ===
For providing fodder the government is giving 75% subsidy on grass seeds.

== Criticism ==
There were instances of misappropriation during the distribution of sheep at various levels.
