= Indian missions =

Schemes of the Government of India

The Government of India has initiated several National Missions in order to achieve individual goals that together ensure the wellbeing of its citizens.

== Agriculture ==
=== National Initiative on Climate Resilient Agriculture ===
NICRA was launched during February 2011 by Indian Council of Agricultural Research (ICAR) with the funding from Ministry of Agriculture, Government of India. The mega project has three major objectives of strategic research, technology demonstrations and capacity building across all sectors of agriculture, dairying and fisheries.

=== Mission Milk ===
The first phase of the National Dairy Plan (‘Mission Milk’) was set about in April 2012 at National Dairy Development Board (Anand, Gujarat). The first phase with an outlay of Rs. 2242 cr. is part of an ambitious 15-year-long National Dairy Plan with an estimated project cost of Rs. 17,300 crores. not to be updated that was not sound good that mission.

=== Rashtriya Gokul Mission ===
It is a mission started by Union government started for development and conservation of indigenous cattle which will help to increase the income of livestock farmers.

== Education ==
=== Sarva Shiksha Abhiyan ===
Sarva Shiksha Abhiyan (The Education for All Movement), is a programme aimed at the universalization of elementary education "in a time bound manner", as mandated by the 86th amendment to the Constitution of India making free and compulsory education to children of ages 6–14 (estimated to be 205 million in number in 2001) a fundamental right.

=== National Translation Mission ===
National Translation Mission (NTM) is a Government of India initiative to make knowledge texts accessible, in all Indian languages listed in the VIII schedule of the Constitution, through translation. NTM was set up as per National Knowledge Commission's recommendation. The Ministry of Human Resource Development has designated Central Institute of Indian Languages as the nodal organization for the operationalization of NTM. In national translation mission should be provided in free of cost (like demo ) in all over India .

=== National Mission for Manuscripts ===
National Mission for Manuscripts (NAMAMI) is an autonomous organisation under Ministry of Culture, Government of India, established to survey, locate and conserve Indian manuscripts, with an aim to create national resource base for manuscripts, for enhancing their access, awareness and use for educational purposes.

=== NIPUN Bharat Mission ===
To enable an environment which ensures basic learning by 2026-27 for children of India up to third standard.

== Healthcare ==
=== National Rural Health Mission ===
NRHM is a health program for improving health care delivery across rural India. The mission, initially mooted for 7 years (2005-2012), is run by the Ministry of Health. The scheme proposes a number of new mechanisms for healthcare delivery including training local residents as Accredited Social Health Activists (ASHA), and the Janani Surakshay Yojana (motherhood protection program). It also aims at improving hygiene and sanitation infrastructure. Noted economists Ajay Mahal and Bibek Debroy have called it "the most ambitious rural health initiative ever".

Under the mission, health funding had increased from 27,700 crores in 2004-05 to 39,000 crores in 2005-06 (from 0.95% of GDP to 1.05%). As of 2009, economists noted that "the mid-term appraisal of the NRHM has found that there has been a significant improvement in health indicators even in this short period". However, in many situations, the state level apparatus have not been able to deploy the additional funds, often owing to inadequacies in the Panchayati Raj functioning. Fund utilization in many states is around 70%.

=== Total Sanitation Campaign ===
Total Sanitation Campaign is aimed at ensuring sanitation facilities in rural areas. The main goal of Total Sanitation Campaign is to eradicate the practice of open defecation by 2017. To give fillip to this endeavour, Government of India has launched Nirmal Gram Puraskar. Communities are facilitated to conduct their own appraisal and analysis of open defecation (OD) and take their own action to become ODF (open defecation free). CLTS (Community-Led Total Sanitation) focuses on the behavioural change needed to ensure real and sustainable improvements. It invests in community mobilisation instead of hardware, and shifting the focus from toilet construction for individual households to the creation of ’open defecation-free’ villages. Union Rural Development Minister Mr Jairam Ramesh says that new Nirmal Bharat Abhiyan will ensure the extension of the sanitation scheme to both Above Poverty Line and Below Poverty Line families. Subsidy amount for the sanitation scheme is also being raised from the present level of 3,000 rupees.

== Urban Planning ==
=== Jawaharlal Nehru National Urban Renewal Mission ===
JNNURM is a massive city modernisation scheme launched by the Ministry of Urban Development. It envisages a total investment of over $20 billion over seven years. It is named after Jawaharlal Nehru, the first prime minister of independent India. The scheme was officially inaugurated by the prime minister, Manmohan Singh on 3 December 2005 as a programme meant to improve the quality of life and infrastructure in the cities. JNNURM aims at creating ‘economically productive, efficient, equitable and responsive Cities’ by a strategy of upgrading the social and economic infrastructure in cities, provision of Basic Services to Urban Poor (BSUP) and wide-ranging urban sector reforms to strengthen municipal governance in accordance with the 74th Constitutional Amendment Act, 1992.

== Rural development ==
=== Swabhimaan ===
It is a campaign of the Government of India which aims to bring banking services to large rural areas without banking services in the country. It was launched on 10 February 2011. This campaign is to be operated by the Ministry of Finance, Government of India and the Indian Banks' Association (IBA). An initiative which seeks better financial inclusion within India will strive for rolling out banking services in 20,000 villages without banking services with a population of 2000 by March 2012 as to improve participation of rural folks in different plans launched by government for them. Under this plan, Banks will select business correspondents (bank saathi). They will act as intermediaries between the rural people and the banks. The government has targeted to cover at least 73,000 new habitations with a population of 2,000 and above and open at least 50 million new accounts by March 2012.

=== Providing Urban Amenities to Rural Areas (PURA) ===
PURA is a strategy for rural development in India. The concept was given by former president Dr. A.P.J. Abdul Kalam. PURA proposes that urban infrastructure and services be provided in rural hubs to create economic opportunities outside of cities. Physical connectivity by providing roads, electronic connectivity by providing communication network and knowledge connectivity by establishing professional and Technical institutions will have to be done in an integrated way so that economic connectivity will emanate. The Indian government aims at developing of compact areas around a potential growth centre in a Gram Panchayat (or a group of Gram Panchayats) through Public Private Partnership (PPP). The government has been running pilot PURA programs in several states since 2004.
