= Centrally Sponsored Scheme =

Government-sponsored programs in India

Centrally Sponsored Schemes (CSS) are schemes that are implemented by state governments of India but are largely funded by the central government with a defined state government share. Examples of such schemes include the Mahatma Gandhi National Rural Employment Guarantee Act and the Pradhan Mantri Gram Sadak Yojana.

== History ==
Even before the advent of the Five-Year plans of India, the practice of providing Central Assistance to the States to finance development schemes had been in vogue. After World War II, the Central Government along with Provincial Governments embarked on developmental projects which received Central Assistance in the form of grants that were called post-war development grants.

Some of these grants were stopped by 1950–51 but grants for schemes like Grow More Food continued. Since the exact distribution of financial liability had not been decided by the time of the First Five Year Plan, many schemes which should have appropriately found place in the State sector were included in the Central sector.

Some such schemes/projects taken up in the first Plan were multipurpose river valley schemes like:

- Damodar Valley
- Namami Gange
- Bhakra Nangal
- Hirakud

In addition to these, community development projects and projects for special minor irrigation, local works etc. were also included. At that point in time, there was no clear criterion for distribution of Central Assistance to the States.

At the beginning of the Second Five Year Plan, a majority of the schemes that were funded centrally and implemented by the States outside of the State Plan were transferred to the State and included in the State Plans. The second plan required large transfer of resources from Centre to States as the resources of all the States taken together were estimated to be short of the requirement by as much as 60%. The case of the Third Five Year Plan was similar.

Thus, Central Assistance in the first three Plans to the States was determined on the basis of needs, problems, past progress, lags in development, contribution to achievement of major national target, potential for growth and contribution in resources by States towards their development programmes, population, area, level of income etc. The quantum of Central Assistance was decided in the light of gap in resources of each individual State.

== Proliferation in number ==
In 1968, the National Development Council Committee recommended a cap on the value of the Centrally Sponsored Schemes as 1/6th of the Central Plan assistance to States. However, the Central Ministries continued to introduce new schemes and the financial limit came to be exceeded. The number of CSS increased from 45 in 1969 to 190 at the end of the Fifth Five Year Plan. Considering the criticism voiced by the States on the proliferation in the number of Centrally Sponsored Schemes, at the time of the Sixth Five Year Plan, 72 Centrally Sponsored Schemes were transferred to the states as part of State Plan schemes. The resultant central savings of about Rs.2,000 crore were given to the States as additional block assistance on a formula known as Income Adjusted Total Population Formula.

The proliferation of Centrally Sponsored Schemes continued since that time and at the time of the Seventh Five Year Plan, the issue was raised again by the State Governments. To resolve various issues concerning CSS, NDC constituted an Expert Group under the Chairmanship of K. Ramamurty. However, when the groups report was reviewed in 1985, it was felt that the criteria to continue with existing CSS/start new CSS as suggested by the Expert Group were too broad and that fulfilment of an important national objective as one of the criteria was essential.

Accordingly, a new committee was constituted under the Chairmanship of Narasimha Rao, Minister of Human Resource Development. The committee in its first meeting approved the following criteria for the formation of a new CSS:

- The fulfillment of an important national objective such as poverty alleviation or minimum standards in education; or
- The programme has a regional or inter-State character; or
- The programme or scheme should be in the nature of a pace setter or should relate to demonstration, survey or research.

For retention of existing schemes, it suggested that schemes of national importance viz. anti-poverty programmes, rural water supply, family welfare and programmes intended to promote human resource development and sustain improvement in quality of life like education which were of national importance may be retained as CSS. Schemes other than those having high national importance could be considered for transfer to the State Plans.

== Transfer to State Plans ==
The Narsimha Rao Committee set up a group headed by J.S. Baijal, the then Secretary, Planning Commission to work out the details, in the light of the guidelines it recommended in its first meeting, regarding retention of CSS, mode of transfer of schemes to State Plans, allocation of outlays for the scheme proposed to be transferred.

The group decided to omit Northeastern council (NEC), Tribal Area Plan, Border Area Development and Hill Area Development Programme etc. from the scope of CSS. The total CSS after merging, weeding and dropping came to 236.

The recommendations of the Narsimha Rao Committee were submitted in 1988 and recommended a transfer of 113 CSS to States with a combined Seventh Five Year Plan outlay of Rs.1,260.75.

The issue of transfer of CSS to the States along with resources again came up for discussion in the 47th NDC meeting held in January, 1997. While discussing the Draft Approach to the Ninth Five Year Plan, several Chief Ministers (Punjab, Delhi, Tripura, UP, Haryana) desired that CSS along with funds may be transferred to the States particularly relating to those sectors which come within the purview of the State List.

== Divergence of opinion ==
By the last year of the Ninth Five Year Plan, the total number of schemes had increased to 360, accounting for about 60% of Central assistance. NDC observed that the better off States were benefiting more through the CSS as they had better resource matching and implementation capabilities compared to poor States.

Thus, the Planning Commission undertook a zero based budgeting (ZBB) exercise in the beginning of the Tenth Five Year Plan and recommended weeding out of 48 schemes, merger of 161 schemes into 53 schemes, and retaining the remaining 135 schemes, implying a carrying forward of 188 CSS to the Tenth Plan.

At the time of the 48th meeting of the NDC in 1999, there still remained a divergence of opinion on the issue of transfer of CSS. This divergence was not only among the States but also between the States on the one hand and the Central Ministries/Departments on the other.

The divergence of opinion was not just related to the selection of schemes but also on how they should be financially executed. Some examples of these opinions were:

- The Chief Minister, Andhra Pradesh suggested abolition of all CSS with transfer of funds to the States in true spirit of cooperative federalism
- The Chief Minister, Arunachal Pradesh proposed that Union Government should finance 100% CSS
- The Chief Ministers of other North Eastern States suggested retention of few important schemes as CSS and others to be transferred to States with full funding

Thus, on the recommendation of the 51st NDC meeting the Planning Commission set up an Expert Group in October 2005 under the Chairmanship of Arvind Varma, ex-Secretary, Government of India to develop concrete proposals for restructuring the CSS in consultation with the Ministries/ Departments concerned.

== Delivery of goods ==
Under the Centrally Sponsored Schemes Central Government of India prepare the guidelines and sanction the fund for the welfare state scheme like Indira Awaas Yojana etc. without taking responsibility to deliver the goods to the BPL Indians without corruption. If any Indian lodge a grievance to the concerned Ministry or department of Govt. of India through Centralised Public Grievance Redress and Monitoring System (CPGRAMS), the related Ministry or department by saying "the subject do not fall under the purview of this Ministry", closed the case by forwarding it to the concerned state govt. According to a Press Trust of India news on November 26, 2014, on an average, around 42,000 grievances are received every month on Centralised Public Grievance Redress and Monitoring System (CPGRAMS) and in the Prime Minister's Office.

== Varma Committee Report ==
The Varma Committee, set up on the recommendation of the 51st NDC meeting, submitted their report in September, 2006. The report recommended the following points:

- A new CSS should be introduced only with the approval of the Full Planning Commission and in consultation with States.
- Planning Commission should undertake zero based budgeting exercise at least once every five years in consultation with the States.
- A new CSS should be approved only if annual outlay is more than Rs.300 crore. Existing CSS with less than Rs. 300 crore annual outlay should be wound by 31 March 2007 and the amount transferred to the States via the Normal Central Assistance route.
- Planning Commission should notify terminal dates, targeted outcomes and outcome measurement strategy for all existing CSS. All new CSS should have start and closure dates, and in the absence of a specified date of closure, would come to a close at the end of that Plan period. The issue of terminal liabilities should be addressed by the Central and State Governments around the time of termination of the CSS.
- All CSS funds should be routed through the State Budget. In the interests of practicality, States should make provision in anticipation of the Central releases.
- Any funds not transferred via the State budget should be subject to annual expenditure certification by the Indian Audit and Accounts Department like all CSS for which funds are released through the State budget.

The report was considered by the Planning Commission while preparing the Eleventh Five Year Plan.

== Current scenario ==
The proliferation of CSS, top down approach, provision of flexibility to States to mould schemes according to local requirements, flow of funds, accountability, enforceability, implementation, involvement of PRIs etc. are still relevant topics today and to address some of these concerns, the Planning Commission had constituted a sub-committee under the Chairmanship of B.K. Chaturvedi, Member, Planning Commission, to look into the restructuring of CSS to enhance its flexibility, scale and efficiency, vide Order No. M-12043/4/2011-PC dated 5 April 2011

The Planning Commission on June 20, 2013 announced that it would reduce the number of Centrally Sponsored Schemes by merging them, thereby resulting in a total of 66 Centrally Sponsored Schemes

After the report of a committee of CM's led by Shivrajsingh Chauhan, Central govt has reduced no. of Centrally Sponsored Schemes from 66 to 28. 10 schemes will be funded fully by central govt while 17 will be funded in ratio of 60:40 between center and state govt.
