= Svamitva Yojana =

Indian drone-based property survey program

Svamitva Yojana (SVAMITVA)
- Survey of Villages Abadi and Mapping with Improvised Technology in Village Areas
- Type of project: Central Sector Scheme
- Country: India
- Prime Minister(s): Narendra Modi
- Ministry: Ministry of Panchayati Raj
- Status: Active
- Website: https://svamitva.nic.in (dysfunctional)

Svamitva Scheme (Survey of Villages Abadi and Mapping with Improvised Technology in Village Area) is a property survey program launched by Indian Prime Minister Narendra Modi on 24 April 2021 under presidency of Ram Nath Kovind, as a central-sector scheme to promote socio-economic empowerment and a more self-reliant rural India. About 6.62 lakh villages across the country will be surveyed in this scheme from 2021 to 2025, using varied technology including drones to collect property data. The initial phase of the scheme was implemented during 2020-21 in the select villages of Maharashtra, Karnataka, Haryana, Uttar Pradesh, Uttarakhand, Madhya Pradesh, Punjab and Rajasthan.

The scheme is intended to reduce property disputes by providing accurate land records while boosting financial liquidity. The scheme aims to streamline planning and revenue collection, as well as ensuring residents are informed of property rights in rural areas. The government has started this scheme to reduce property disputes. It has been decided to survey the land and issue property cards. According to the Ministry of Panchayati Raj, government have issued 1.63 crore property cards by 6 December 2023.

== Recent Developments and Achievements ==
As of December 31, 2024, the SVAMITVA Scheme has made remarkable progress:

- Drone surveys completed: 310,388 villages have undergone drone-based surveys.
- Maps handed over: 265,893 villages have received finalized maps.
- Parcels digitized: approximately 99.85 million
- Property cards distributed: 1,12,409

On 18 January 2025 Prime Minister Narendra Modi issued 65 lakh property cards to residents of 230 districts of 10 states and 2 union territories under the Swamitva yojana.
