= Tembhrusonda =

Population (2011)
  - Total: 2,545
- Area code: 531708

Tembhrusonda is an Indian village located in the Chikhaldara Block of Amravati district in Maharashtra. Placed in rural region of Amravati district of Maharashtra, it is one of the many 193 villages of Chikhaldara Block of Amravati district. As per the administration records, the village code of Tembhrusonda is 531708. The village has an estimated 471 houses.

== Demographics ==
According to Census 2011, Tembhrusonda's population is 2545. Out of this, 1080 of the population are males while the females count 1465 here. This village has 274 children in the age group of 0–6 years. Among them 133 are boys and 141 are girls.

The literacy rate in Tembhrusonda village is about 73%. 1867 out of total 2545 population are educated here. In males the literacy rate is 76% as 827 males out of total 1080 are literate however female literacy rate is 70% as 1040 out of total 1465 females are educated in this Village.

The number of occupied individuals of Tembhrusonda was 1178 in 2011, whereas 1367 were not working. Of those working. 283 were dependent on agriculture.

== Tembhrusonda Data ==
| Particulars | Total | Male | Female |
|---|---|---|---|
| Total No. of Houses | 471 | - | - |
| Population | 2,545 | 1,080 | 1,465 |
| Child (0-6) | 274 | 133 | 141 |
| Schedule Caste | 185 | 89 | 96 |
| Schedule Tribe | 1,744 | 663 | 1,081 |
| Literacy | 82.21 % | 87.33 % | 78.55 % |
| Total Workers | 1,178 | 629 | 549 |
| Main Worker | 1,166 | 0 | 0 |
| Marginal Worker | 12 | 5 | 7 |
