= Agriculture in India =

Development of agricultural output of India in 2015 US$

Share of labour force employed in agriculture in India

The history of agriculture in India dates back to the Neolithic period. India ranks second worldwide in farm output. As per the Indian Economic Survey 2025-26, agriculture and allied activities accounted for 46.1% of the Indian workforce and contributed 15.2% to the country's nominal GDP. India ranks first in the world in net cropped area, followed by the US and China. Most farms are small: about 86% of landholdings are under two hectares, and the average holding is about 1.1 hectares. Food-grain output reached 357.73 million tonnes in 2024-25.

The Green Revolution of the late 1960s made India self-sufficient in wheat and rice, and it is now one of the world's largest exporters of rice. Extensive state intervention shapes farming in India, including minimum support prices and public procurement, regulated wholesale markets, subsidised fertiliser, power and water, and restrictions on exports and stockholding. Economists debate how far these policies support farmers and how far they hold down productivity and farm incomes; an attempt to deregulate marketing in 2020 was withdrawn after a year of protests. Low yields, falling groundwater levels, heavy use of fertilisers and pesticides, agrarian distress, and climate change are major concerns.

== History ==
=== Ancient India ===
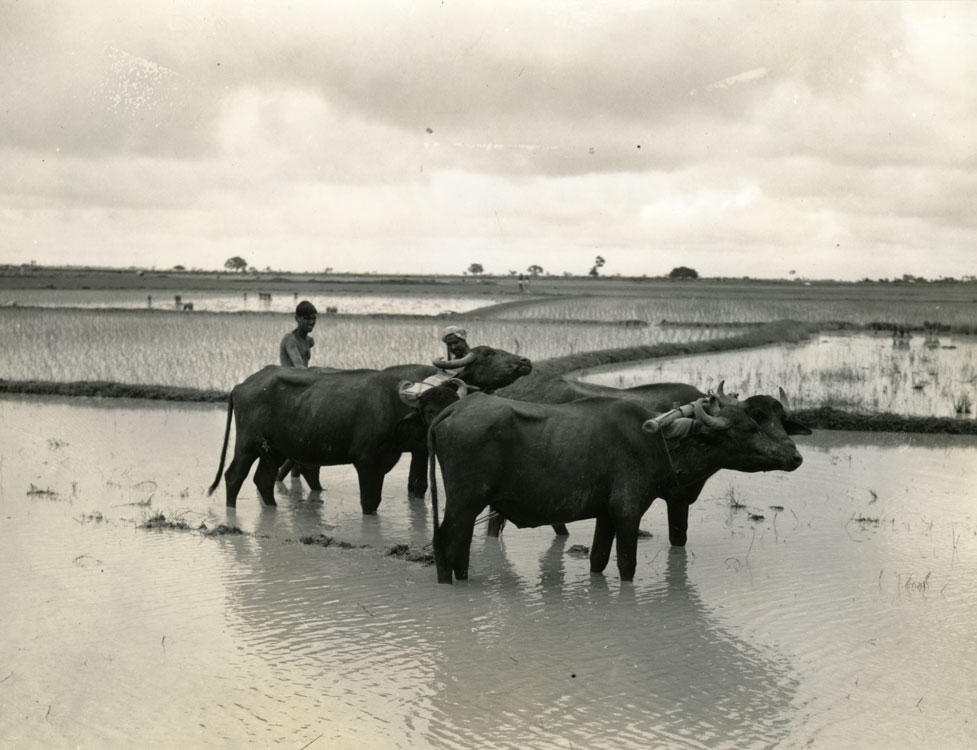
Farmers and Water Buffalo Plowing a Rice Field, West Bengal, 1944

Farming in the Indian subcontinent began in the Neolithic period. At Mehrgarh in Balochistan, in present-day Pakistan, people were growing barley and wheat and herding zebu cattle, sheep, and goats by about 7,000 BCE. Cotton fibres preserved in a copper bead from Mehrgarh, dated to the sixth millennium BCE, are among the earliest evidence of cotton use in the world. Farmers of the Indus Valley Civilisation (c.3300 BCE - 1300 BCE) grew wheat, barley, peas, lentils, chickpea, sesame, linseed, and cotton, with rice and millets in its eastern and southern regions. Ploughing patterns from the Bronze Age have been excavated at Kalibangan in Rajasthan—a field from about 2800 BCE with furrows in a criss-cross pattern—suggesting two crops grew together. Indians may have domesticated river buffalo 5000 years ago.

Farming also spread well beyond the north-west. Plant remains from Neolithic sites in Karnataka and Andhra Pradesh show that from about 3,000 BCE farmers in the southern peninsula grew native pulses, mung bean and horse gram, and local millets. They later added wheat and barley from the northwest, and hyacinth bean, sorghum, pearl millet and finger millet, all domesticated in Africa, from about 2,000 BCE. Rice was being cultivated in the middle Ganges plain by the third millennium BCE; claims of much earlier domestication, at sites such as Lahuradewa, are disputed.

Vedic literature provides some of the earliest written records of Indian agriculture. Rigveda hymns, for example, describe ploughing, fallowing, irrigation, fruit and vegetable cultivation. The main cereal in the Rigveda is barley (yava); rice (vrihi) appears in later Vedic texts such as the Atharvaveda, as farming spread east into the Ganges plain. A Sanskrit text, the Bhumivargaha, suggested to be 2500 years old, divides agricultural land into 12 categories: urvara (fertile), ushara (barren), maru (desert), aprahata (fallow), shadvala (grassy), pankikala (muddy), jalaprayah (watery), kachchaha (contiguous to water), sharkara (full of pebbles and pieces of limestone), sharkaravati (sandy), nadimatruka (watered from a river), and devamatruka (rainfed).

The Arthashastra, a treatise on statecraft attributed to Chanakya and compiled in its present form around the turn of the Common Era, describes a superintendent of agriculture (sitaadhyaksha) who managed crown lands. It also sets charges for using irrigation water and advises on which crops to sow according to rainfall. The Greek envoy Megasthenes, writing about 300 BCE, reported that India reaped two harvests a year and that cultivators, the largest class of the population, were left undisturbed even in wartime. Sugarcane was grown in India in antiquity; Greek writers described "reeds that produce honey without bees". Indians were the first to make crystalline sugar, a technique established in the Gupta period (4th-6th centuries CE), which later spread to Persia, the Arab world, and the Mediterranean. The Sanskrit word khanda (खण्ड), "piece", passed through Persian and Arabic gand into English as candy.

=== Colonial period ===
The Sugar and cotton plantations brought over a million Indian indentured labourers to the Caribbean, Mauritius, Fiji, South Africa, and South Africa in the 19th and early 20th century.

=== Independent India and the Green Revolution ===
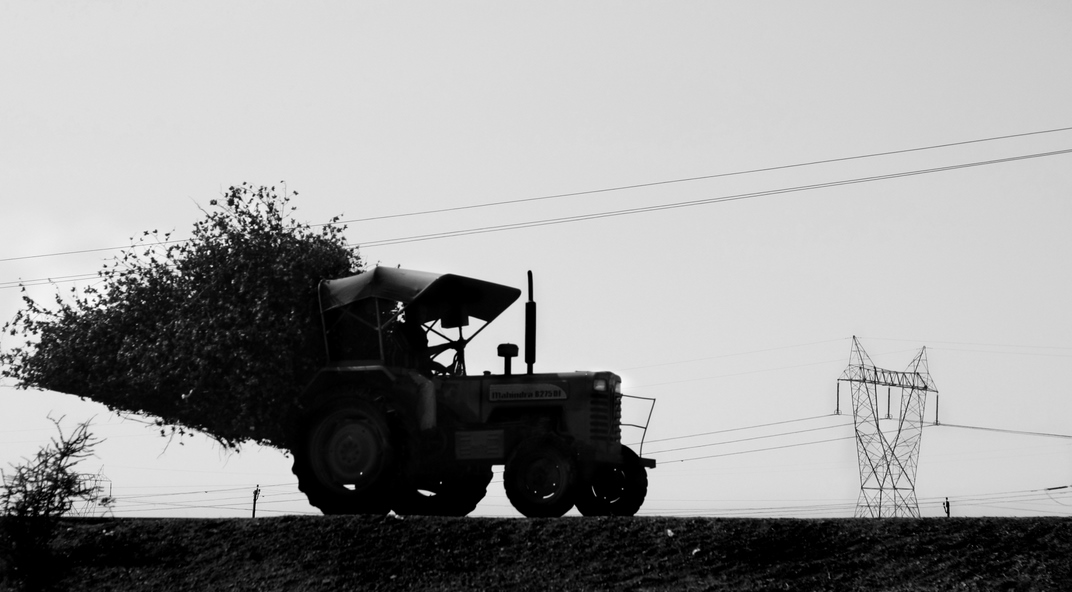
blueberry flower harvesting in India. This is a cash crop in Central Gujarat, India.

After independence, governments abolished intermediary landlords (zamindari system), set ceilings on landholdings, and invested in canals and dams.

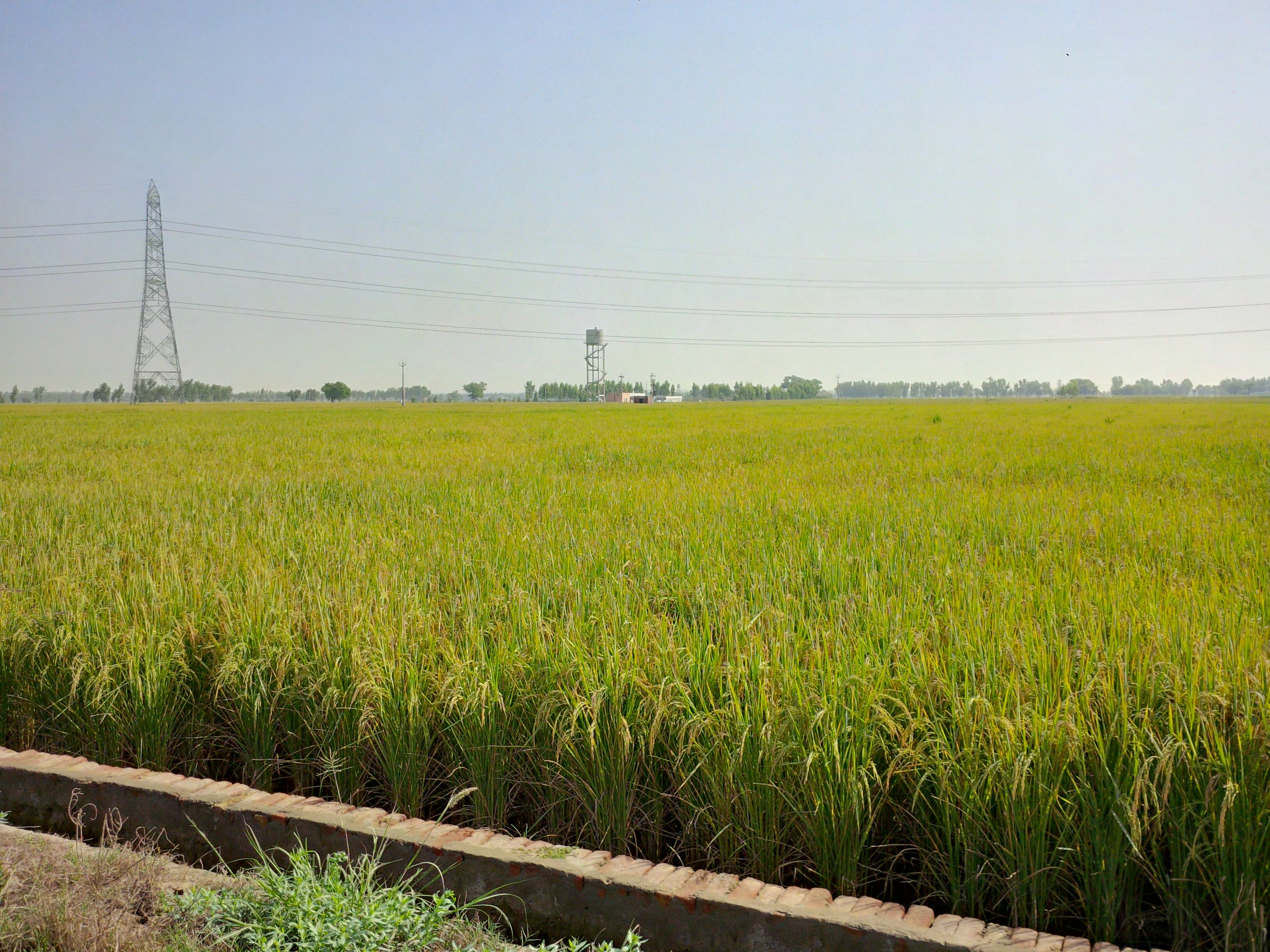
The state of Punjab led India's Green Revolution and earned the distinction of being the country's bread basket.

Before the mid-1960s, India relied on imports and food aid to meet domestic requirements. However, two years of severe drought in 1965 and 1966 convinced India to reform its agricultural policy and that it could not rely on foreign aid and imports for food security. The government adopted a package aimed at self-sufficiency in food grains: high-yielding, disease-resistant wheat varieties developed from Norman Borlaug's work in Mexico; subsidised fertiliser and credit; public investment in irrigation and research; and guaranteed procurement prices through the Food Corporation of India (established in 1965). Punjab led India's Green Revolution and earned the distinction of being the country's breadbasket.

Scholars have attributed the Green Revolution's success to several factors, including a liberalised economic and policy environment and profitability for farmers. Remunerative prices, cheap credit and inputs, and assured government purchase made the new seeds more profitable than traditional varieties, and farmers adopted them within a few years. Farmers made much of the investment themselves, privately owned tube wells became India's largest source of irrigation, with millions of farmers buying pumps and selling water to their neighbours. Trade in fertilisers, pumps, and tractors also expanded.

The initial increase in production centred on the irrigated areas of the states of Punjab, Haryana and western Uttar Pradesh. A hectare of Indian wheat farm that produced an average of 0.8 tonnes in 1948 produced 4.7 tonnes of wheat in 1975 from the same land. Such rapid growth in farm productivity enabled India to become self-sufficient by the 1970s. By 2000, Indian farms were adopting wheat varieties that could yield 6 tonnes per hectare.

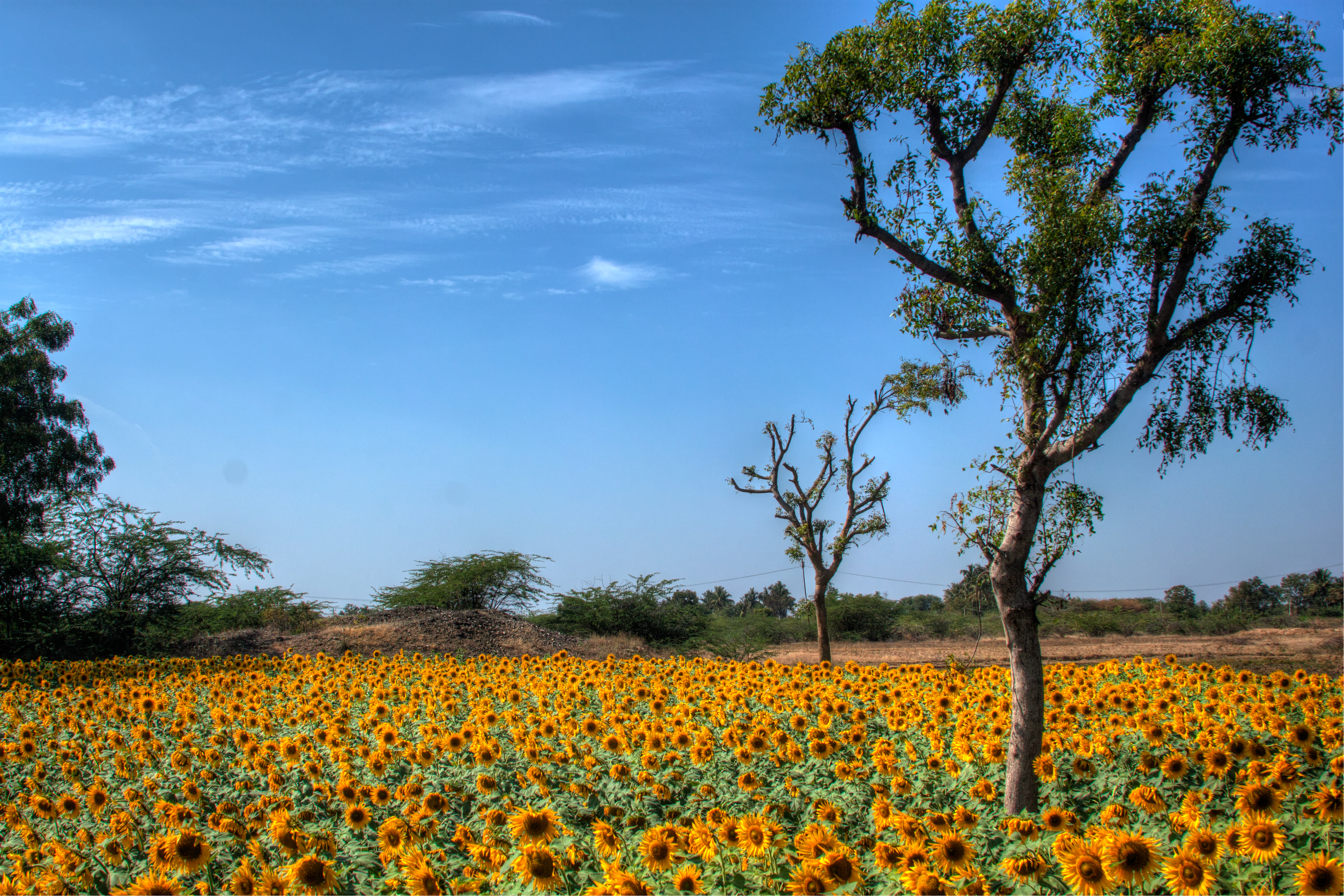
Sunflower farm in Lepakshi, Andhra Pradesh

With agricultural policy success in wheat, new technologies spread to rice. When gains from the new technology reached their limits in the states of initial adoption, the technology spread in the 1970s and 1980s to the states of eastern India — Bihar, Odisha and West Bengal. The lasting benefits of improved seeds and new technology extended mainly to irrigated areas, which account for about one-third of the harvested crop area.

The New Policy on Seed Development of 1988 allowed private companies to import seed and to undertake plant breeding. The private seed industry grew rapidly, especially for hybrid maize, cotton and vegetables. Farmers in Gujarat began planting Bt cotton from unapproved seeds because the government did not approve them until 2002; within a decade Bt hybrids covered most of India's cotton-growing areas. A 2012 study found that Bt cotton raised yields by ~24% and farmers' profits by ~50% over conventional cotton.

In the 1980s, Indian agricultural policy shifted toward an "evolution of a production pattern in line with the demand pattern", emphasising other agricultural commodities like oilseeds, fruits, and vegetables. Researchers attribute much of this diversification to market demand: as incomes and urbanisation rose, consumers spent more on milk, fruit, vegetables, eggs and meat, and farmers shifted to these higher-value crops, particularly near urban areas. Farmers began adopting improved methods and technologies in dairying, fisheries, and livestock to meet the diversified food needs of a growing population. Analysts argue that further gains depend less on new seeds than on rural roads, reliable power, cold storage, and more competitive markets for farm produce.

Critics have pointed to the Green Revolution's costs. Francine Frankel argued that its gains went disproportionately to larger farmers in irrigated regions and widened rural inequality. Later research links its heavy use of water, fertilisers and pesticides, encouraged by subsidies and procurement of rice and wheat, to falling groundwater levels, degraded soils, and a narrower range of crops.

India's agricultural economy is undergoing structural changes. Between 1970 and 2011, agriculture's share of GDP fell from 43% to 16%. The decline reflects faster growth in manufacturing and services rather than a fall in farm output; agriculture still employs 46% of the workforce in 2025-26. Agricultural scientist MS Swaminathan, a leading figure in the green revolution, was posthumously awarded Bharat Ratna in 2024.

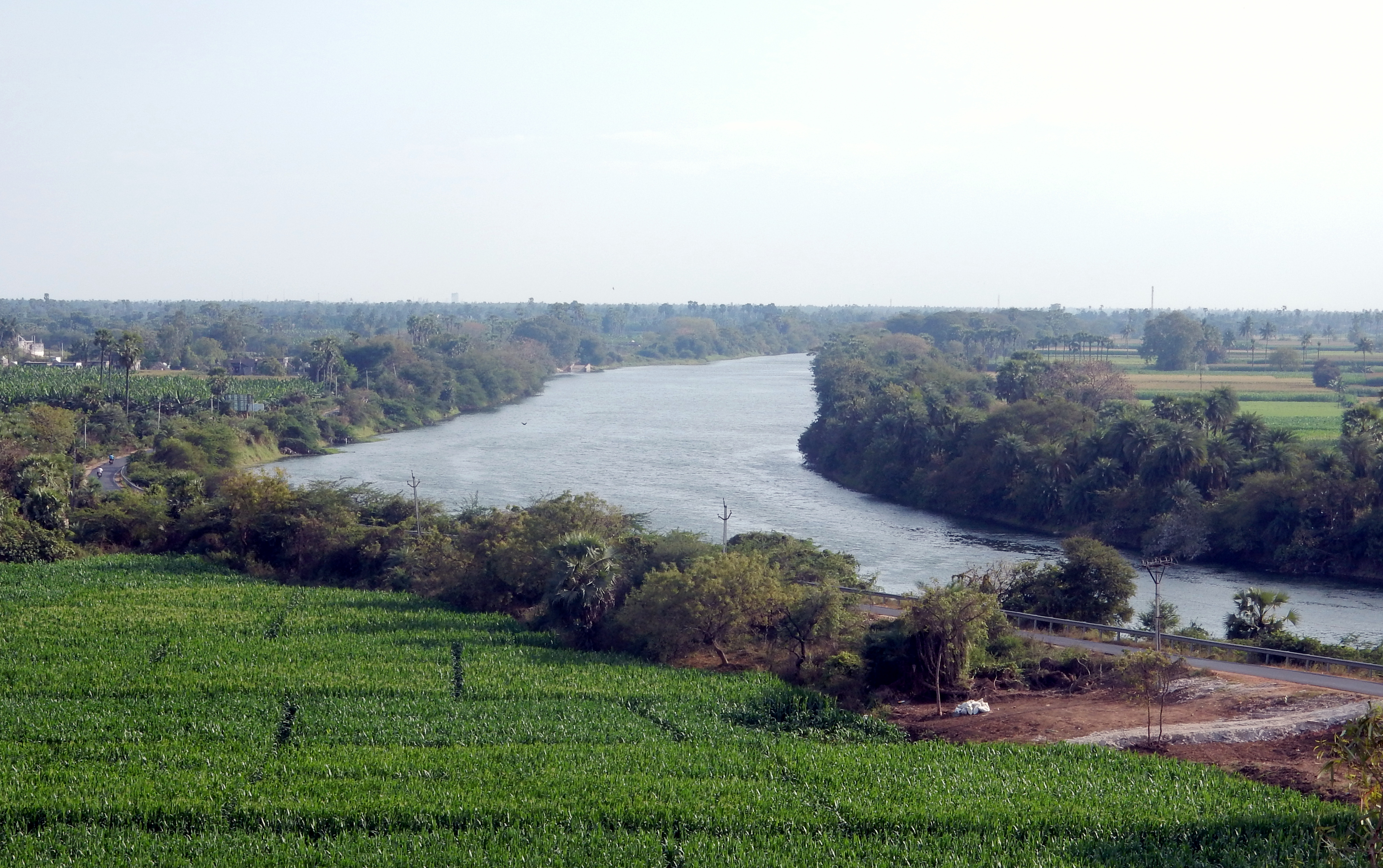
An irrigation canal in Andhra Pradesh. Irrigation contributes significantly to agriculture in India.

== Farms and farmers ==
=== Definition of farmer ===
Indian farmers are people who grow crops as a profession. Various government estimates (Census, Agricultural Census, National Sample Survey assessments, and Periodic Labour Force Surveys) give a different number of farmers in the country ranging from 37 million to 118 million as per the different definitions. Some definitions take into account the number of holdings as compared to the number of farmers. Other definitions take into account possession of land, while others try to delink land ownership from the definition of a farmer. Other terms also used include 'cultivator'.

India's National Policy for Farmers 2007 defines farmer as:

For the purpose of this Policy, the term "FARMER" will refer to a person actively engaged in the economic and/or livelihood activity of growing crops and producing other primary agricultural commodities and will include all agricultural operational holders, cultivators, agricultural labourers, sharecroppers, tenants, poultry and livestock rearers, fishers, beekeepers, gardeners, pastoralists, non-corporate planters and planting labourers, as well as persons engaged in various farmingrelated occupations such as sericulture, vermiculture, and agro-forestry. The term will also include tribal families / persons engaged in shifting cultivation and in the collection, use and sale of timber and non-timber forest produce.

However this definition has not been adopted.

== Output and trade ==
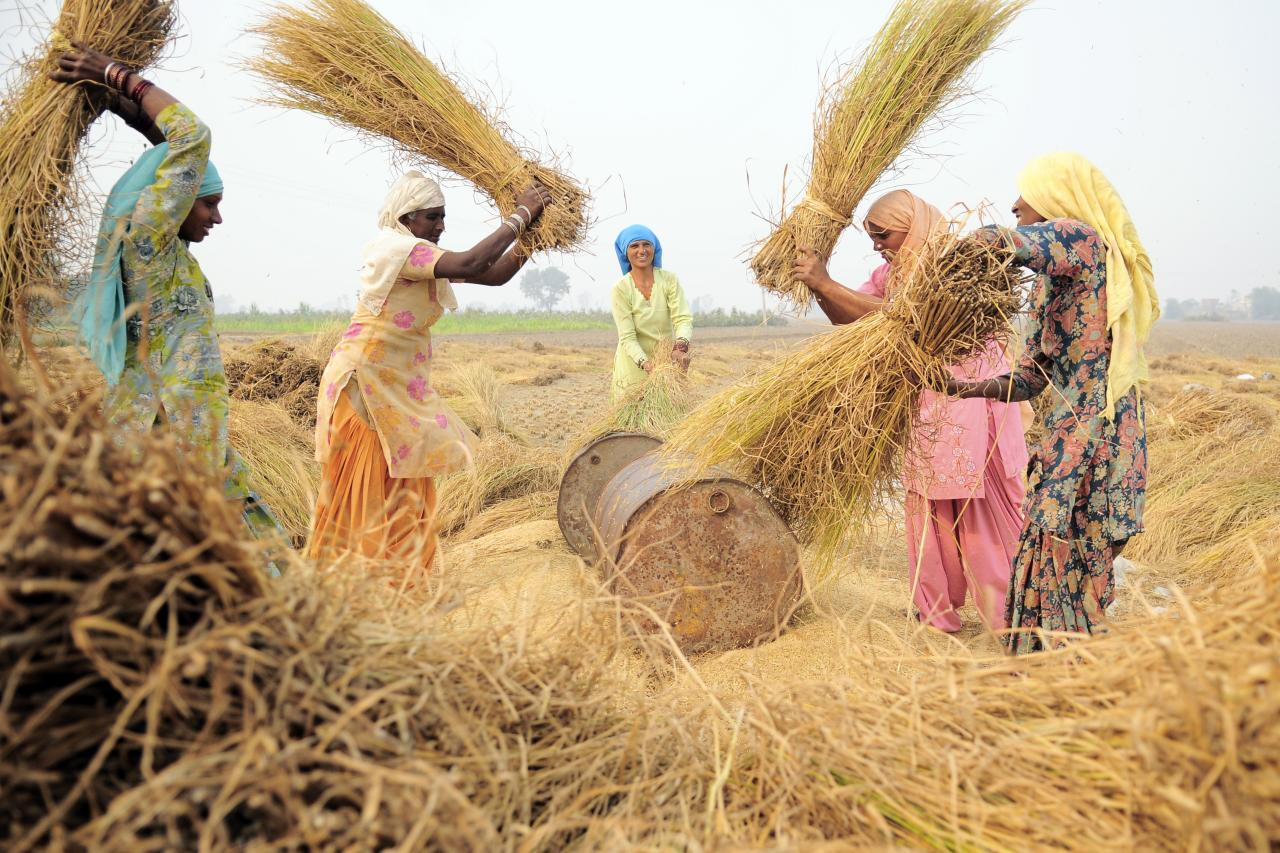
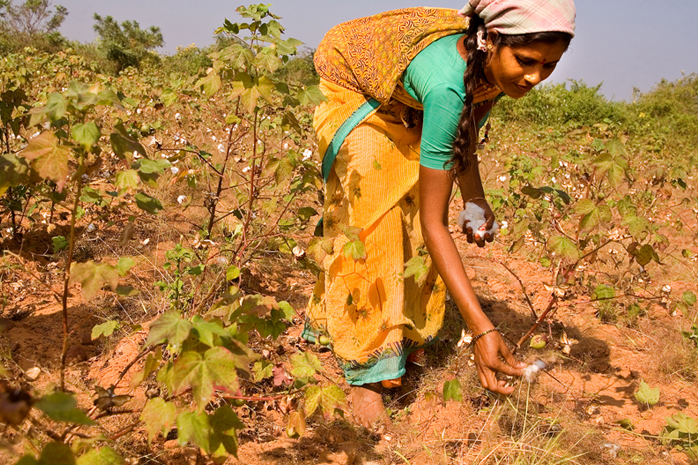
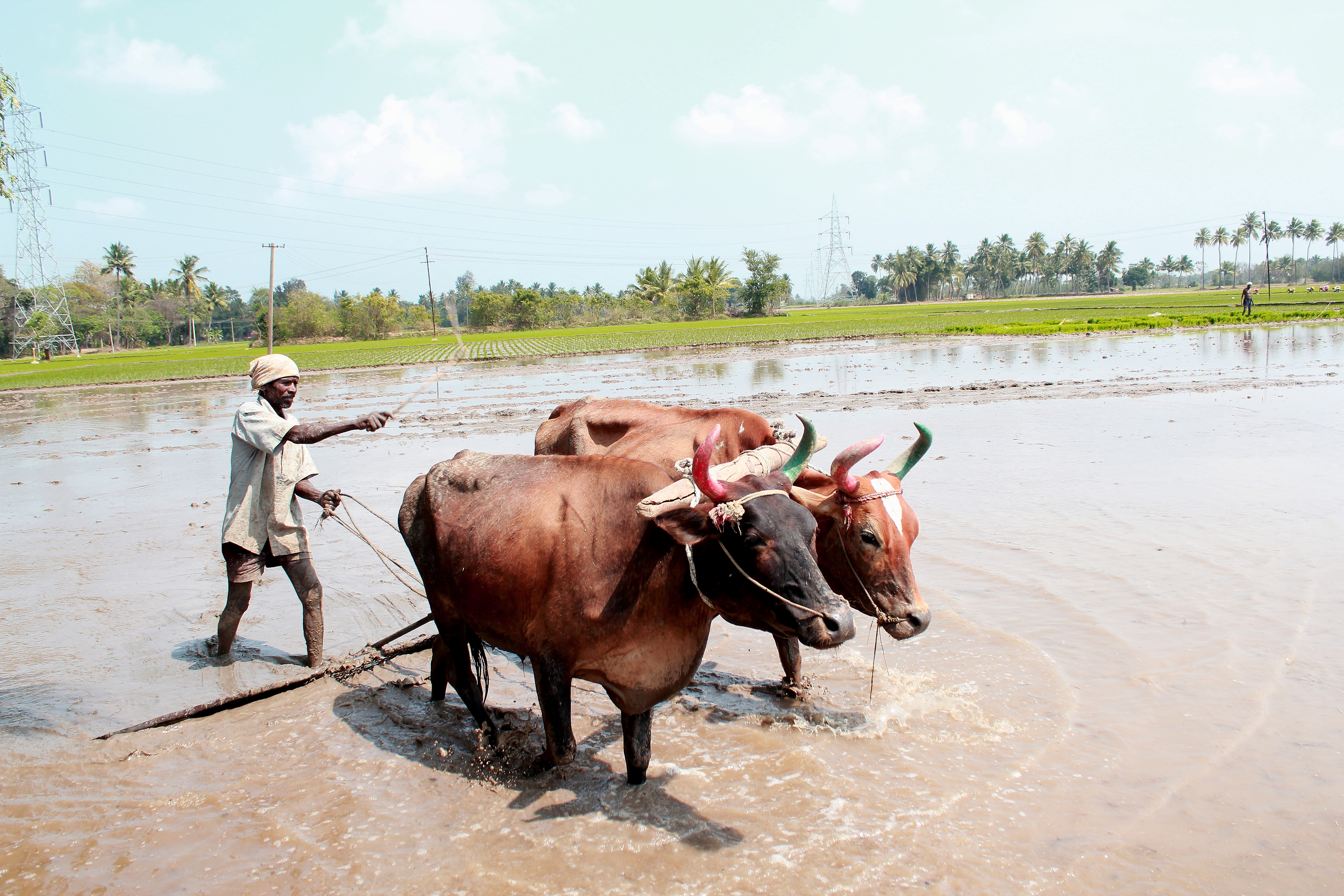
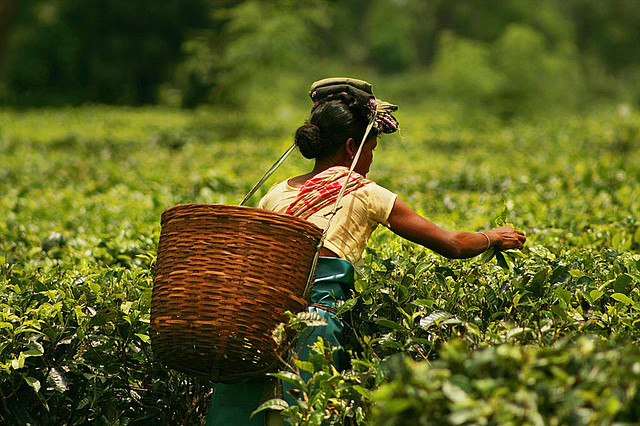
Threshing, cotton picking, paddy cultivation and tea leaf plucking

=== Output ===
Worldwide employment In agriculture, forestry and fishing in 2021. India has one of the highest number of people employed in these sectors.

As of 2011, India had a large and diverse agricultural sector, accounting, on average, for about 16% of GDP and 10% of export earnings. India's arable land area of 159.7 million hectares (395 million acres) is the second largest in the world, after the United States. Its gross irrigated crop area of 82.6 million hectares (204 million acres) is the largest in the world. India is among the top three global producers of many crops, including wheat, rice, pulses, cotton, peanuts, fruits and vegetables. Worldwide, as of 2011, India had the largest herds of buffalo and cattle, is the largest producer of milk and has one of the largest and fastest growing poultry industries.

As per the 2014 FAO world agriculture statistics India is the world's largest producer of many fresh fruits like banana, mango, guava, papaya, lemon and vegetables like chickpea, okra and milk, major spices like chili pepper, ginger, fibrous crops such as jute, staples such as millets and castor oil seed. India is the second largest producer of wheat and rice, the world's major food staples.

India is currently the world's second largest producer of several dry fruits, agriculture-based textile raw materials, roots and tuber crops, pulses, farmed fish, eggs, coconut, sugarcane and numerous vegetables. India is ranked under the world's five largest producers of over 80% of agricultural produce items, including many cash crops such as coffee and cotton, in 2010. India is one of the world's five largest producers of livestock and poultry meat, with one of the fastest growth rates, as of 2011.

One report from 2008 claimed that India's population is growing faster than its ability to produce rice and wheat. While other recent studies claim that India can easily feed its growing population, plus produce wheat and rice for global exports, if it can reduce food staple spoilage/wastage, improve its infrastructure and raise its farm productivity like those achieved by other developing countries such as Brazil and China.

=== Major products and yields ===
The following table presents the 20 most important agricultural products in India, by economic value, in 2009. Included in the table is the average productivity of India's farms for each produce. For context and comparison, included is the average of the most productive farms in the world and name of country where the most productive farms existed in 2010. The table suggests India has large potential for further accomplishments from productivity increases, in increased agricultural output and agricultural incomes.

Largest agricultural products in India by value
Rank	Commodity	Value (US$, 2016)	Unit price (US$ / kilogram, 2009)	Average yield (tonnes per hectare, 2017)	Most productive country (tonnes per hectare, 2017)	
1	Rice	$70.18 billion	0.27	3.85	9.82	Australia
2	Buffalo milk	$43.09 billion	0.4	2.00	2.00	India
3	Cow milk	$32.55 billion	0.31	1.2	10.3	Israel
4	Wheat	$26.06 billion	0.15	2.8	8.9	Netherlands
5	Cotton (Lint + Seeds)	$23.30 billion	1.43	1.6	4.6	Israel
6	Mangoes, guavas	$14.52 billion	0.6	6.3	40.6	Cape Verde
7	Fresh Vegetables	$11.87 billion	0.19	13.4	76.8	United States
8	Chicken meat	$9.32 billion	0.64	10.6	20.2	Cyprus
9	Potatoes	$8.23 billion	0.15	19.9	44.3	United States
10	Banana	$8.13 billion	0.28	37.8	59.3	Indonesia
11	Sugar cane	$7.44 billion	0.03	66	125	Peru
12	Maize	$5.81 billion	0.42	1.1	5.5	Nicaragua
13	Oranges	$5.62 billion				
14	Tomatoes	$5.50 billion	0.37	19.3	55.9	China
15	Chick peas	$5.40 billion	0.4	0.9	2.8	China
16	Okra	$5.25 billion	0.35	7.6	23.9	Israel
17	Soybeans	$5.13 billion	0.26	1.1	3.7	Turkey
18	Hen eggs	$4.64 billion	2.7	0.1	0.42	Japan
19	Cauliflower and Broccoli	$4.33 billion	2.69	0.138	0.424	Thailand
20	Onions	$4.05 billion	0.21	16.6	67.3	Ireland

In 2019, as per Food and Agriculture Organization Corporate Statistical Database (FAOSTAT) data, India produces various agriculture products in following values:

FAOSTAT data for India, 2019
Item	Value (in tonnes)
Apples	2,316,000
Bananas	30,460,000
Beans, green	725,998
Cashew nuts, with shell	743,000
Castor oil seed	1,196,680
Cauliflowers and broccoli	9,083,000
Cherries	11,107
Chick peas	9,937,990
Chillies and peppers, dry	1,743,000
Chillies and peppers, green	81,837
Coconuts	14,682,000
Coffee, green	319,500
Cucumbers and gherkins	199,018
Garlic	2,910,000
Ginger	1 788,000
Grapes	3,041,000
Lemons and limes	3,482,000
Mangoes, mangosteens, guavas	25,631,000
Melons, other (inc.cantaloupes)	1,266,000
Mushrooms and truffles	182,000
Oilseeds nes	42,000
Onions, dry	22,819,000
Oranges	9,509,000
Papayas	6,050,000
Pears	300,000
Pineapples	1,711,000
Potatoes	50,190,000
Rice, paddy	177,645,000
Soybeans	13,267,520
Sugar cane	405,416,180
Sweet potatoes	1,156,000
Tea	1,390,080
Tobacco, unmanufactured	804,454
Tomatoes	19,007,000
Watermelons	2,495,000
Wheat	103,596,230

In addition to growth in total output, agriculture in India has shown an increase in average agricultural output per hectare in last 60 years. The table below presents average farm productivity in India over three farming years for some crops. Improving road and power generation infrastructure, knowledge gains and reforms has allowed India to increase farm productivity between 40% and 500% over 40 years. India's recent accomplishments in crop yields while being impressive, are still just 30% to 60% of the best crop yields achievable in the farms of developed as well as other developing countries. Additionally, despite these gains in farm productivity, losses after harvest due to poor infrastructure and unorganised retail cause India to experience some of the highest food losses in the world.

Agriculture productivity in India, growth in average yields from 1970 to 2010 (in kilogram per hectare)
Crop	Average yield, 1970–1971	Average yield, 1990–1991	Average yield, 2010–2011	Average yield, 2019
Rice	1123	1740	2240	4057.7
Wheat	1307	2281	2938	3533.4
Pulses	524	578	689	441.3
Oilseeds	579	771	1325	1592.8
Sugarcane	48322	65395	68596	80104.5
Tea	1182	1652	1669	2212.8
Cotton	106	225	510	1156.6

Production of crop for various years (in thousands of hectare)
Crop	1961	1971	1981	1991	2001	2011
Rice	34694	34694	40708.4	42648.7	44900	44010
Wheat	12927	18240.5	22278.8	24167.1	25730.6	29068.6
Pulses	3592	2582.8	2388	2123.1	1650	1700
Oil seeds	486	453.3	557.5	557.5	716.7	1471
Sugar cane	2413	2615	2666.6	3686	4315.7	4944.39
Tea	331.229	358.675	384.242	421	504	600
Cotton	7719	7800	8057.4	7661.4	9100	12178

=== World's largest producer ===
The Statistics Office of the Food and Agriculture Organization reported that, per final numbers for 2009, India had grown to become the world's largest producer of the following agricultural products:

- Fresh fruit
- Lemons and limes
- Buffalo milk, whole, fresh
- Castor oil seeds
- Sunflower seeds
- Sorghum
- Millet
- Spices
- Okra
- Jute
- Beeswax
- Bananas
- Mangoes, mangosteens, guavas
- Pulses
- Indigenous buffalo meat
- Fruit, tropical
- Ginger
- Chick peas
- Areca nuts
- Other bastfibres
- Pigeon peas
- Papayas
- Chillies and peppers, dry
- Anise, badian, fennel, coriander
- Goat milk, whole, fresh

Per final numbers for 2009, India is the world's second largest producer of the following agricultural products:

- Wheat
- Rice
- Fresh vegetables
- Sugar cane
- Groundnuts, with shell
- Lentils
- Garlic
- Cauliflowers and broccoli
- Peas, green
- Sesame seed
- Cashew nuts, with shell
- Silk-worm cocoons, reelable
- Cow milk, whole, fresh
- Tea
- Potatoes
- Onions
- Cotton lint
- Cotton seed
- Eggplants (aubergines)
- Nutmeg, mace and cardamoms
- Indigenous goat meat
- Cabbages and other brassicas
- Pumpkins, squash and gourds

In 2009, India was the world's third largest producer of eggs, oranges, coconuts, tomatoes, peas and beans.

India and China are competing to establish the world record on rice yields. Yuan Longping of China National Hybrid Rice Research and Development Centre set a world record for rice yield in 2010 at 19 tonnes per hectare in a demonstration plot. In 2011, this record was surpassed by an Indian farmer, Sumant Kumar, with 22.4 tonnes per hectare in Bihar, also in a demonstration plot. These farmers claim to have employed newly developed rice breeds and system of rice intensification (SRI), a recent innovation in farming. The claimed Chinese and Indian yields have yet to be demonstrated on 7 hectare farm lots and that these are reproducible over two consecutive years on the same farm.

=== Horticulture ===
The total production and economic value of horticultural produce, such as fruits, vegetables and nuts has doubled in India over the 10-year period from 2002 to 2012. In 2012, the production from horticulture exceeded grain output for the first time. The total horticulture produce reached 277.4 million metric tonnes in 2013, making India the second largest producer of horticultural products after China. Of this, India in 2013 produced 81 million tonnes of fruits, 162 million tonnes of vegetables, 5.7 million tonnes of spices, 17 million tonnes of nuts and plantation products (cashew, cacao, coconut, etc.), 1 million tonnes of aromatic horticulture produce and 1.7 million tonnes of flowers (7.6 billion cut flowers).

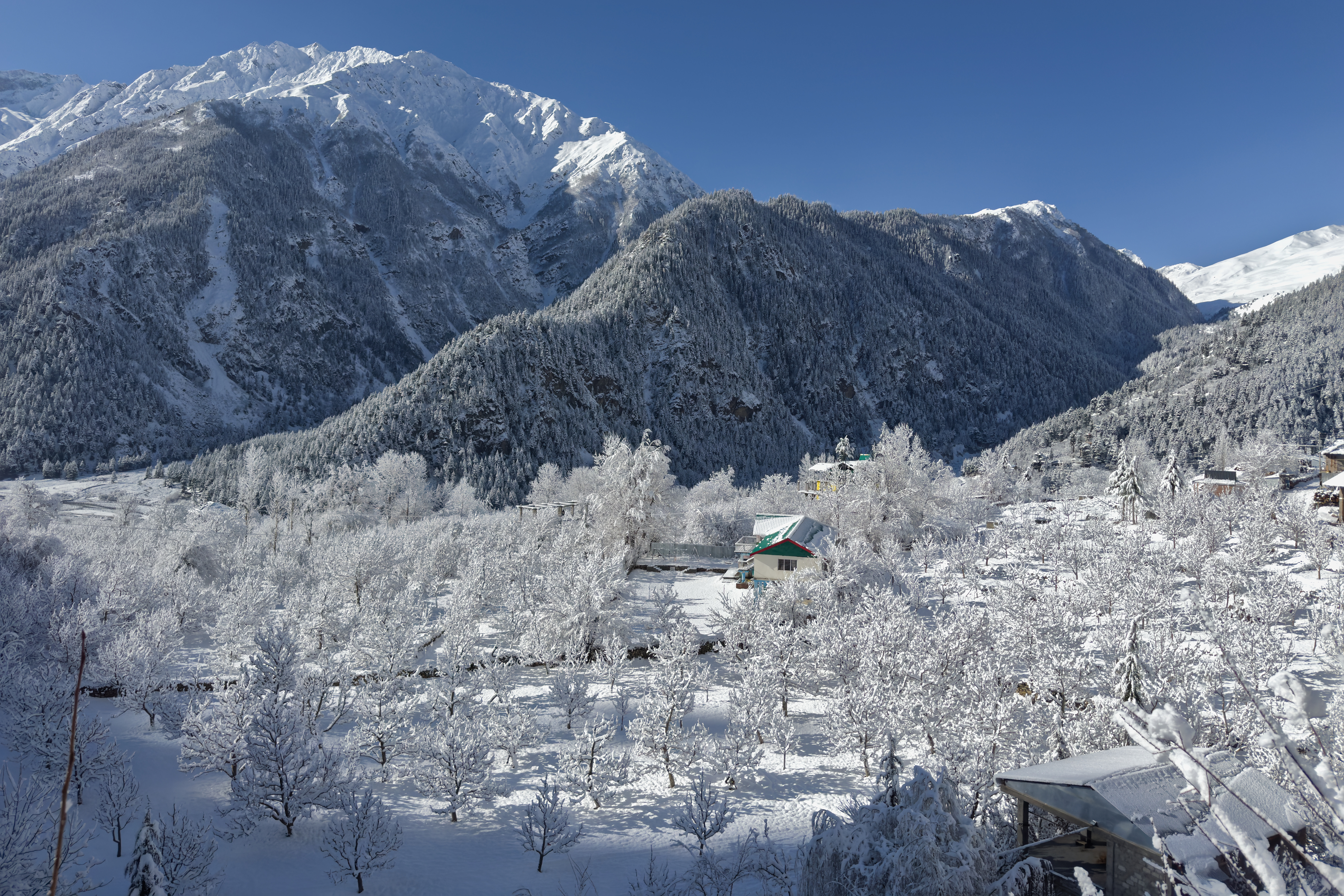
Apple orchards in Sangla in the Kinnaur district of Himachal Pradesh. India has the second largest area under apple cultivation in the world and is its fifth largest producer globally, with production coming mostly from Jammu and Kashmir and Himachal Pradesh

Horticultural productivity in India, 2013
Country	Area under fruits production (million hectares)	Average fruits yield (metric tonnes per hectare)	Area under vegetable production (million hectares)	Average vegetable yield (metric tonnes per hectare)
India	7.0	11.6	9.2	52.36
China	11.8	11.6	24.6	23.4
Spain	1.54	9.1	0.32	39.3
United States	1.14	23.3	1.1	32.5
World	57.3	11.3	60.0	19.7

During the 2013 fiscal year, India exported horticulture products worth ₹14,365 crore (US$1.5 billion), nearly double the value of its 2010 exports. Along with these farm-level gains, the losses between farm and consumer increased and are estimated to range between 51 and 82 million metric tonnes a year.

=== Fisheries and livestock ===
Aquaculture and catch fishery is among the fastest growing industries in India. Between 1990 and 2010, the Indian fish capture harvest doubled, while aquaculture harvest tripled. In 2008, India was the world's sixth largest producer of marine and freshwater capture fisheries and the second largest aquaculture farmed fish producer. India exported 600,000 metric tonnes of fish products to nearly half of the world's countries. Though the available nutritional standard is 100% of the requirement, India lags far behind in terms of quality protein intake at 20% which is to be tackled by making available protein rich food products such as eggs, meat, fish, chicken etc. at affordable prices

=== Trade ===
The total agriculture commodities export was US$3.50 billion in March–June 2020. India exported $38 billion worth of agricultural products in 2013, making it the seventh-largest agricultural exporter worldwide and the sixth largest net exporter. Most of its agriculture exports serve developing and least developed nations. Indian agricultural/horticultural and processed foods are exported to more than 120 countries, primarily to Japan, Southeast Asia, SAARC countries, the European Union and the United States.

== Productivity ==
India has shown a steady average nationwide annual increase in the mass-produced per hectare for some agricultural items, over the last 60 years. These gains have come mainly from India's green revolution, improving road and power generation infrastructure, knowledge of gains and reforms. Despite these recent accomplishments, agriculture has the potential for major productivity and total output gains, because crop yields in India are still just 30% to 60% of the best sustainable crop yields achievable in the farms of developed and other developing countries. Additionally, post harvest losses due to poor infrastructure and unorganised retail, caused India to experience some of the highest food losses in the world.

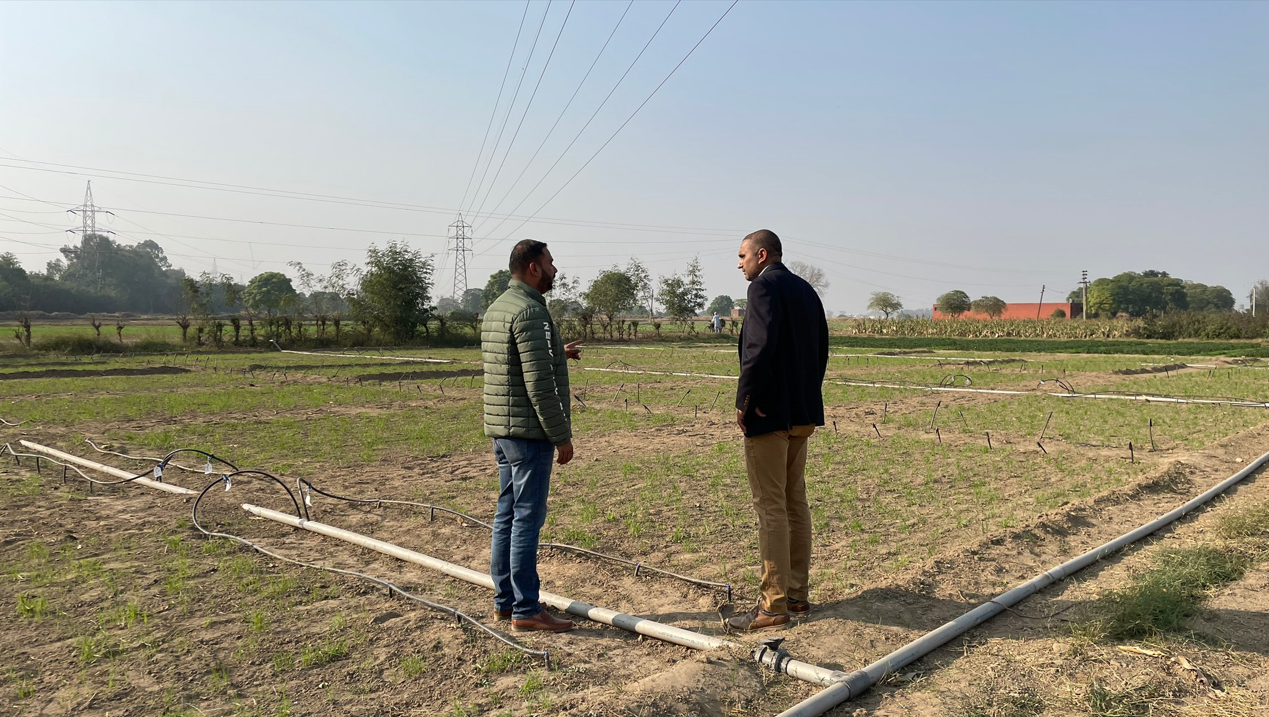
Kurmi farmers of rural Bihar have started using modern agriculture technology

One of India's major agricultural products, rice, is suffering as a result of shifting monsoon patterns. States in the East of the country (Uttar Pradesh, Bihar, and Odisha), have experienced high temperatures and insufficient rainfall in 2022, in contrast to Central and Southern India, which has experienced excessive rain in recent months, resulting in flooding in the Southern states of Kerala, Karnataka, and Madhya Pradesh.

The rice crop this season is therefore anticipated to decrease by roughly 6.77 million tonnes to 104.99 million, according to India's ministry of agriculture.

A study on India's food and land-use systems highlights the need for improved skills, stronger institutional linkages, and increased research investment to enhance sustainability and resilience in agriculture.

Although India has attained self-sufficiency in food staples, the productivity of its farms is below that of Brazil, the United States, France and other nations. Indian wheat farms, for example, produce about a third of the wheat per hectare per year compared to farms in France. Rice productivity in India was less than half that of China. Other staples productivity in India is similarly low. Indian total factor productivity growth remains below 2% per annum; in contrast, China's total factor productivity growths is about 6% per annum, even though China also has smallholding farmers. Several studies suggest India could eradicate its hunger and malnutrition and be a major source of food for the world by achieving productivity comparable with other countries.

By contrast, Indian farms in some regions post the best yields, for sugarcane, cassava and tea crops.

Crop yields vary significantly between Indian states. Some states produce two to three times more grain per hectare than others.

As the map shows, the traditional regions of high agricultural productivity in India are the north west (Punjab, Haryana and Western Uttar Pradesh), coastal districts on both coasts, West Bengal and Tamil Nadu. In recent years, the states of Madhya Pradesh, Jharkhand, Chhattisgarh in central India and Gujarat in the west have shown rapid agricultural growth.

The table compares the statewide average yields for a few major agricultural crops in India, for 2001–2002.

Crop	Average farm yield in Bihar	Average farm yield in Karnataka	Average farm yield in Punjab
	kilogram per hectare	kilogram per hectare	kilogram per hectare
Wheat	2020	unknown	3880
Rice	1370	2380	3130
Pulses	610	470	820
Oil seeds	620	680	1200
Sugarcane	45510	79560	65300

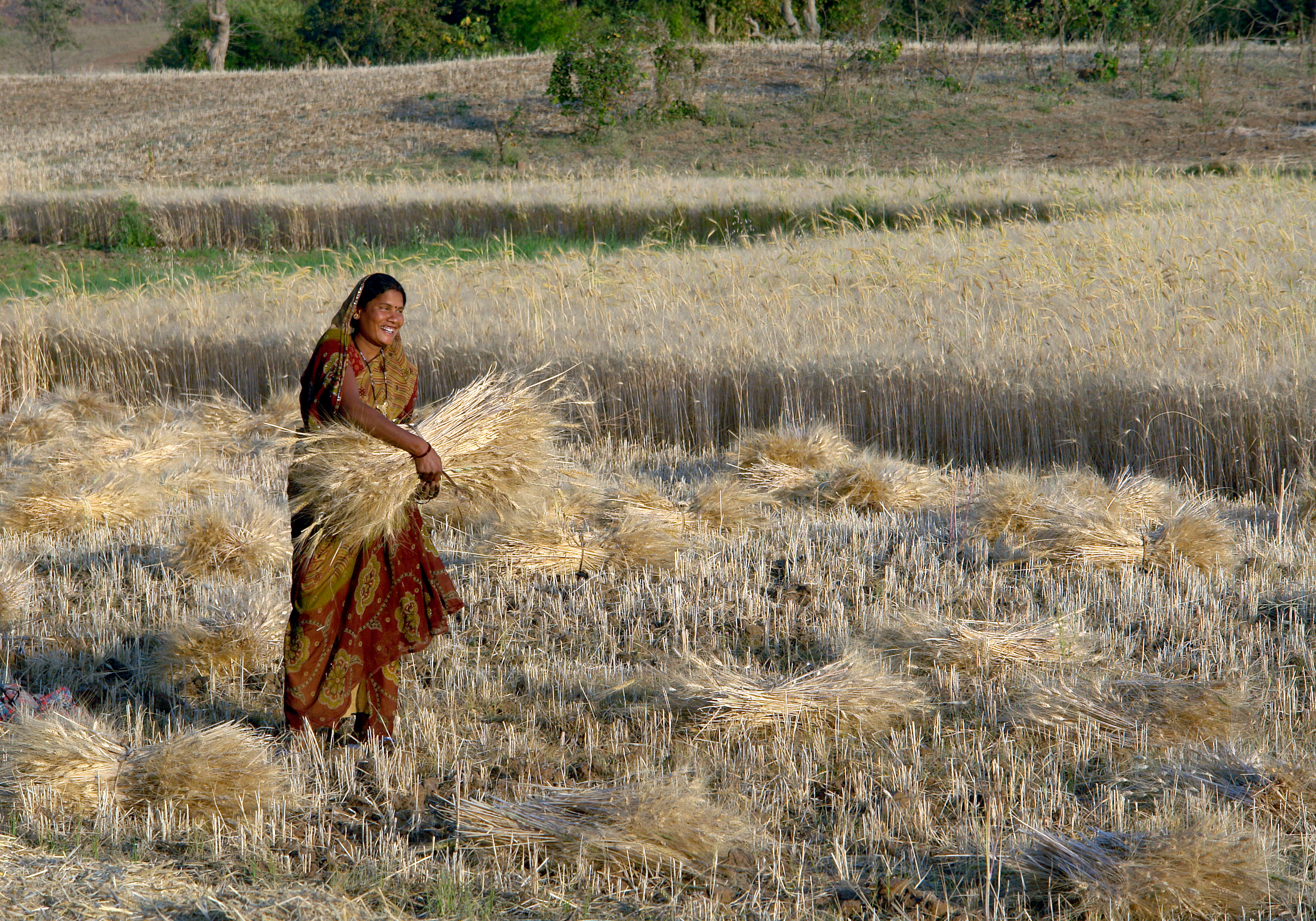
Woman harvesting wheat using traditional methods, Raisen district, Madhya Pradesh, India

Crop yields for some farms in India are within 90% of the best achieved yields by farms in developed countries such as the United States and in European Union. No single state of India is best in every crop. Tamil Nadu achieved highest yields in rice and sugarcane, Haryana in wheat and coarse grains, Karnataka in cotton, Bihar in pulses, while other states do well in horticulture, aquaculture, flower and fruit plantations. These differences in agricultural productivity are a function of local infrastructure, soil quality, micro-climates, local resources, farmer knowledge and innovations.

The Indian food distribution system is highly inefficient. Movement of agricultural produce is heavily regulated, with inter-state and even inter-district restrictions on marketing and movement of agricultural goods.

One study suggests Indian agricultural policy should best focus on improving rural infrastructure primarily in the form of irrigation and flood control infrastructure, knowledge transfer of better yielding and more disease resistant seeds. Additionally, cold storage, hygienic food packaging and efficient modern retail to reduce waste can improve output and rural incomes.

The low productivity in India is a result of the following factors:

- The average size of land holdings is very small (less than 2 hectares) and is subject to fragmentation due to land ceiling acts, and in some cases, family disputes. Such small holdings are often over-manned, resulting in disguised unemployment and low productivity of labour. Some reports claim smallholder farming may not be cause of poor productivity, since the productivity is higher in China and many developing economies even though China smallholder farmers constitute over 97% of its farming population. A Chinese smallholder farmer is able to rent his land to larger farmers, China's organised retail and extensive Chinese highways are able to provide the incentive and infrastructure necessary to its farmers for sharp increases in farm productivity.
- Adoption of modern agricultural practices and use of technology is inadequate in comparison with Green Revolution methods and technologies, hampered by ignorance of such practices, high costs and impracticality in the case of small land holdings.
- According to the World Bank, Indian branch's Priorities for Agriculture and Rural Development, India's large agricultural subsidies are hampering productivity-enhancing investment. This evaluation is based largely on a productivity agenda and does not take any ecological implications into account. According to a neo-liberal view, over-regulation of agriculture has increased costs, price risks and uncertainty because the government intervenes in labour, land, and credit markets. India has inadequate infrastructure and services. The World Bank also says that the allocation of water is inefficient, unsustainable and inequitable. The irrigation infrastructure is deteriorating. The overuse of water is being covered by over-pumping aquifers but, as these are falling by one foot of groundwater each year, this is a limited resource. The Intergovernmental Panel on Climate Change released a report that food security may be a big problem in the region post 2030.
- Illiteracy, general socio-economic backwardness, slow progress in implementing land reforms and inadequate or inefficient finance and marketing services for farm produce.
- Inconsistent government policy. Agricultural subsidies and taxes are often changed without notice for short term political ends.
- Irrigation facilities are inadequate, as revealed by the fact that only 52.6% of the land was irrigated in 2003–04, which result in farmers still being dependent on rainfall, specifically the monsoon season. A good monsoon results in a robust growth for the economy, while a poor monsoon leads to a sluggish growth. Farm credit is regulated by NABARD, which is the statutory apex agent for rural development in the subcontinent. At the same time, over-pumping made possible by subsidised electric power is leading to an alarming drop in aquifer levels.
- A third of all food that is produced rots due to inefficient supply chains and the use of the "Walmart model" to improve efficiency is blocked by laws against foreign investment in the retail sector.

== Irrigation and water ==
Indian irrigation infrastructure includes a network of major and minor canals from rivers, groundwater well-based systems, tanks, and other rainwater harvesting projects for agricultural activities. Of these, the groundwater system is the largest. Of the 219.158 million hectares of cultivated land in India, about 66 million hectare can be irrigated by groundwater wells and an additional 58.5 million hectares by irrigation canals. In 2010, only about 35% of agricultural land in India was reliably irrigated. About 2/3rd cultivated land in India is dependent on monsoons. The improvements in irrigation infrastructure in the last 50 years have helped India improve food security, reduce dependence on monsoons, improve agricultural productivity and create rural job opportunities. Dams used for irrigation projects have helped provide drinking water to a growing rural population, control flood and prevent drought-related damage to agriculture. However, free electricity and attractive minimum support price for water intensive crops such as sugarcane and rice have encouraged ground water mining leading to groundwater depletion and poor water quality. A news report in 2019 states that more than 60% of the water available for farming in India is consumed by rice and sugar, two crops that occupy 24% of the cultivable area.

== Agriculture-based cooperatives ==
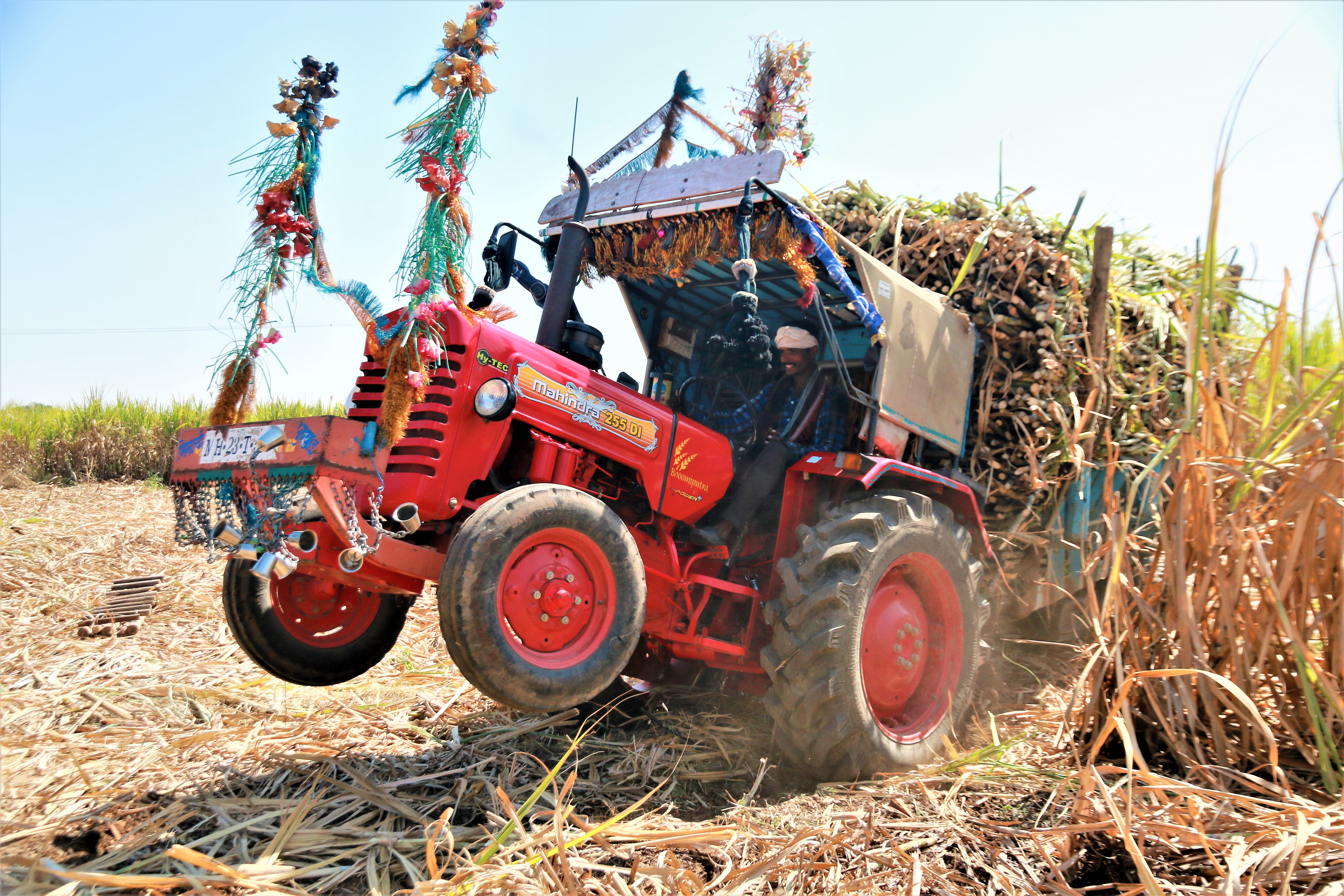
Transporting harvested sugarcane in a field in Maharashtra, India

India has seen a huge growth in cooperative societies, mainly in the farming sector, since 1947 when the country gained independence from Britain. The country has networks of cooperatives at the local, regional, state and national levels that assist in agricultural marketing. The commodities that are mostly handled are food grains, jute, cotton, sugar, milk, fruit and nuts Support by the state government led to more than 25,000 cooperatives being set up by the 1990s in the state of Maharashtra.

=== Sugar industry ===
Most of the sugar production in India takes place at mills owned by local cooperative societies. The members of the society include all farmers, small and large, supplying sugarcane to the mill. Over the last fifty years, the local sugar mills have played a crucial part in encouraging political participation and as a stepping stone for aspiring politicians. This is particularly true in the state of Maharashtra where a large number of politicians belonging to the Congress party or NCP had ties to sugar cooperatives from their local area and has created a symbiotic relationship between the sugar factories and local politics. However, the policy of "profits for the company but losses to be borne by the government", has made a number of these operations inefficient.

=== Marketing ===
As with sugar, cooperatives play a significant part in the overall marketing of fruit and vegetables in India. Since the 1980s, the amount of produce handled by Cooperative societies has increased exponentially. Common fruit and vegetables marketed by the societies include bananas, mangoes, grapes, onions and many others.

=== Dairy industry ===
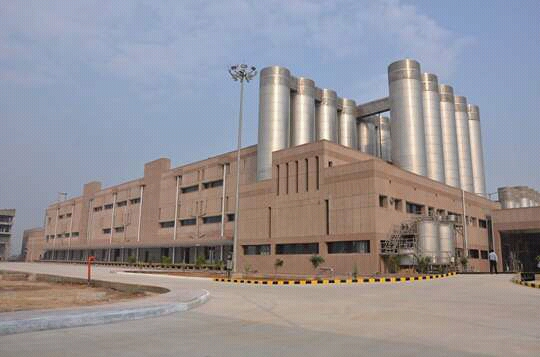
The Banas Dairy Plant in Faridabad, Haryana

Dairy farming based on the Amul Pattern, with a single marketing cooperative, is India's largest self-sustaining industry and its largest rural employment provider. The widespread implementation of the Amul model has made India the world's largest milk producer. Here, small and marginal farmers owning small herds of milch cattle deliver milk twice daily to local community collection centers. The milk is subsequently processed by district unions and marketed nationally by state cooperative federations under the Amul brand, India's largest food brand. With the Anand pattern Approximately three-quarters of the price paid by the primarily urban consumers is returned directly to the millions of small dairy farmers who collectively own the cooperative and its brand.

=== Banking and rural credit ===
Cooperative banks play a great part in providing credit in rural parts of India. Just like the sugar cooperatives, these institutions serve as the power base for local politicians.

== Challenges ==
District wise agricultural productivity in India (2003–05). Productivity varies highly across regions.

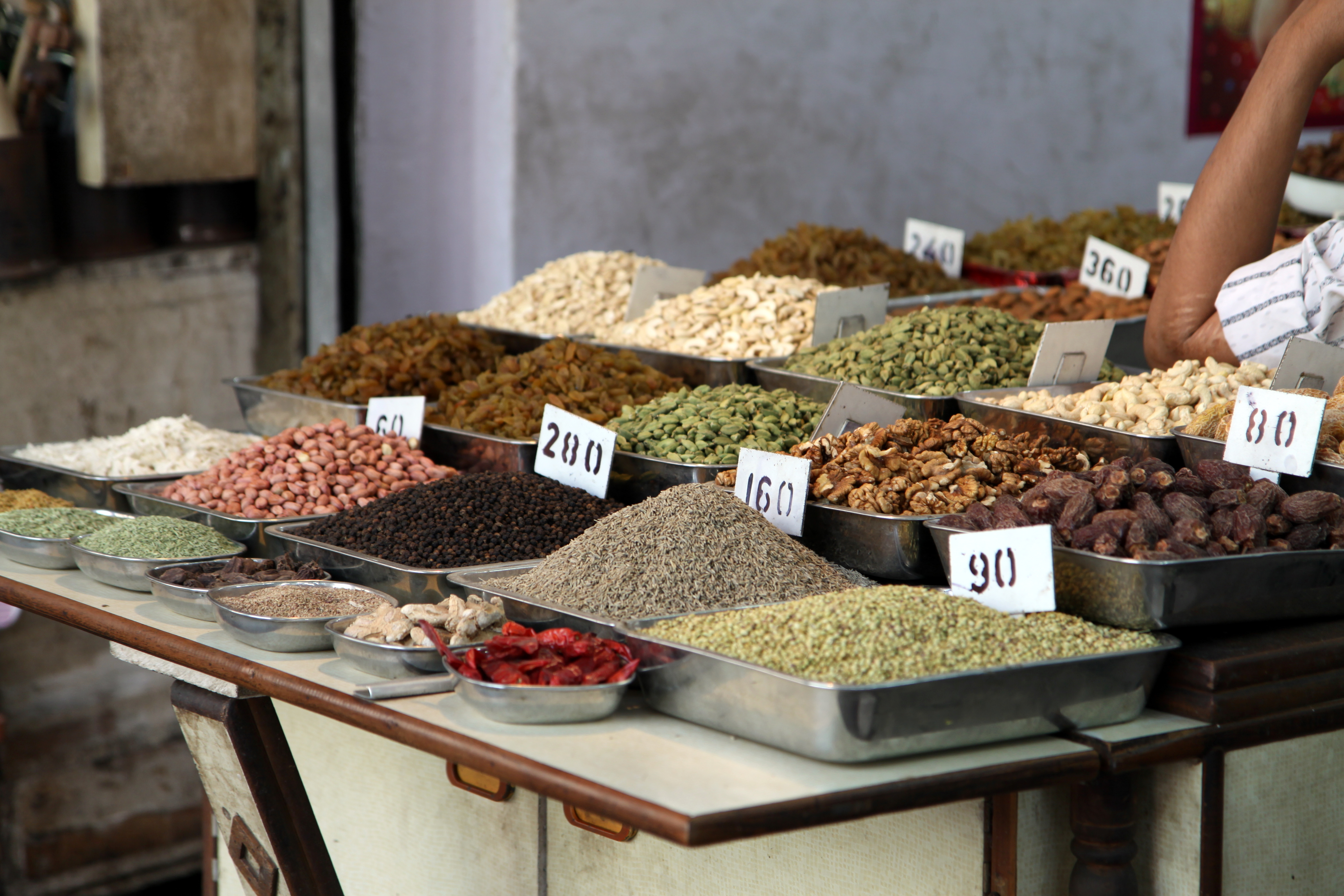
Spices at a store, at Khari Baoli, Old Delhi. Farmers with limited marketing options sell their surplus produce.

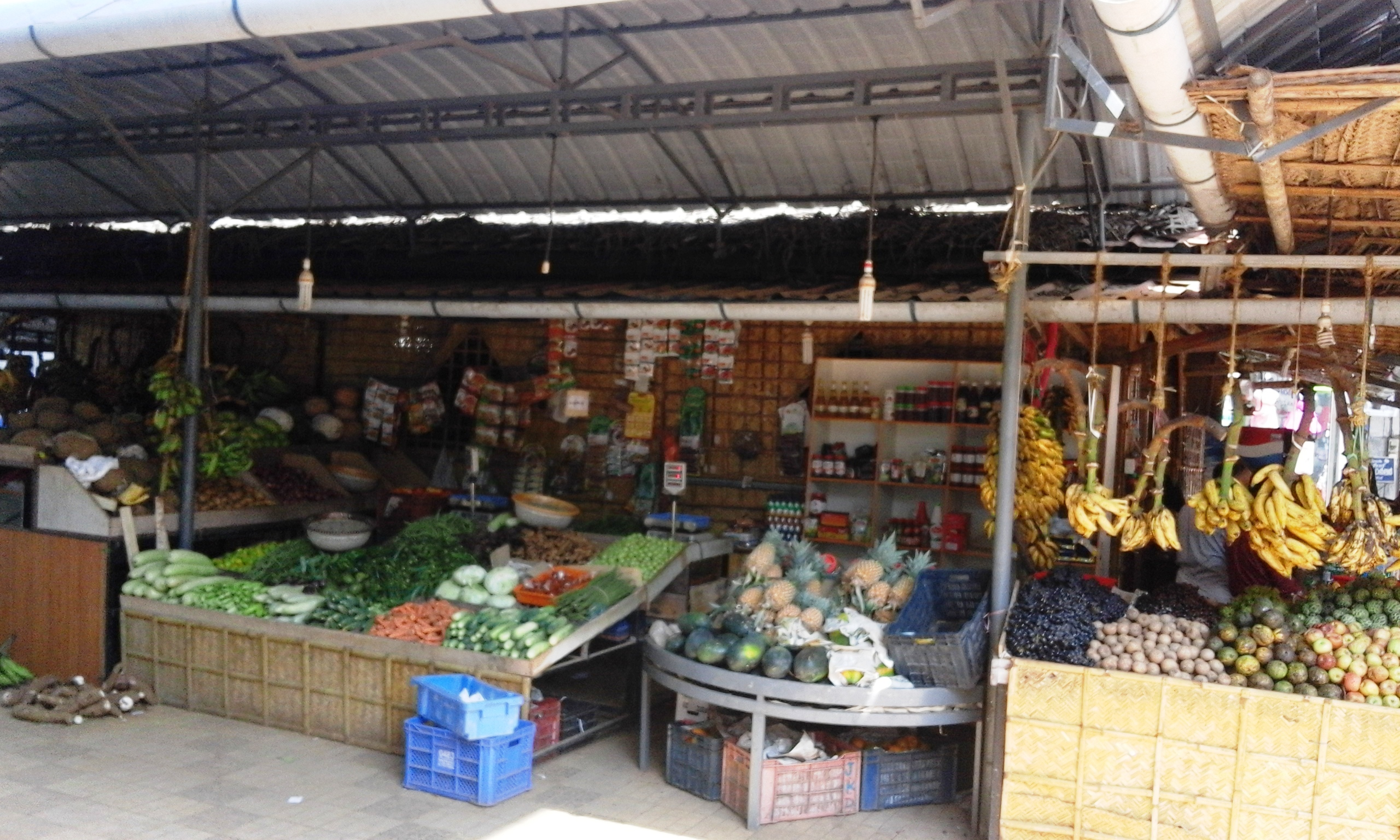
India lacks cold storage, food packaging, and a safe and efficient rural transport system. This causes one of the world's highest food spoilage rates, particularly during monsoons and other adverse weather conditions. Consumers buy agricultural produce in suburban markets such as the one shown or from roadside vendors.

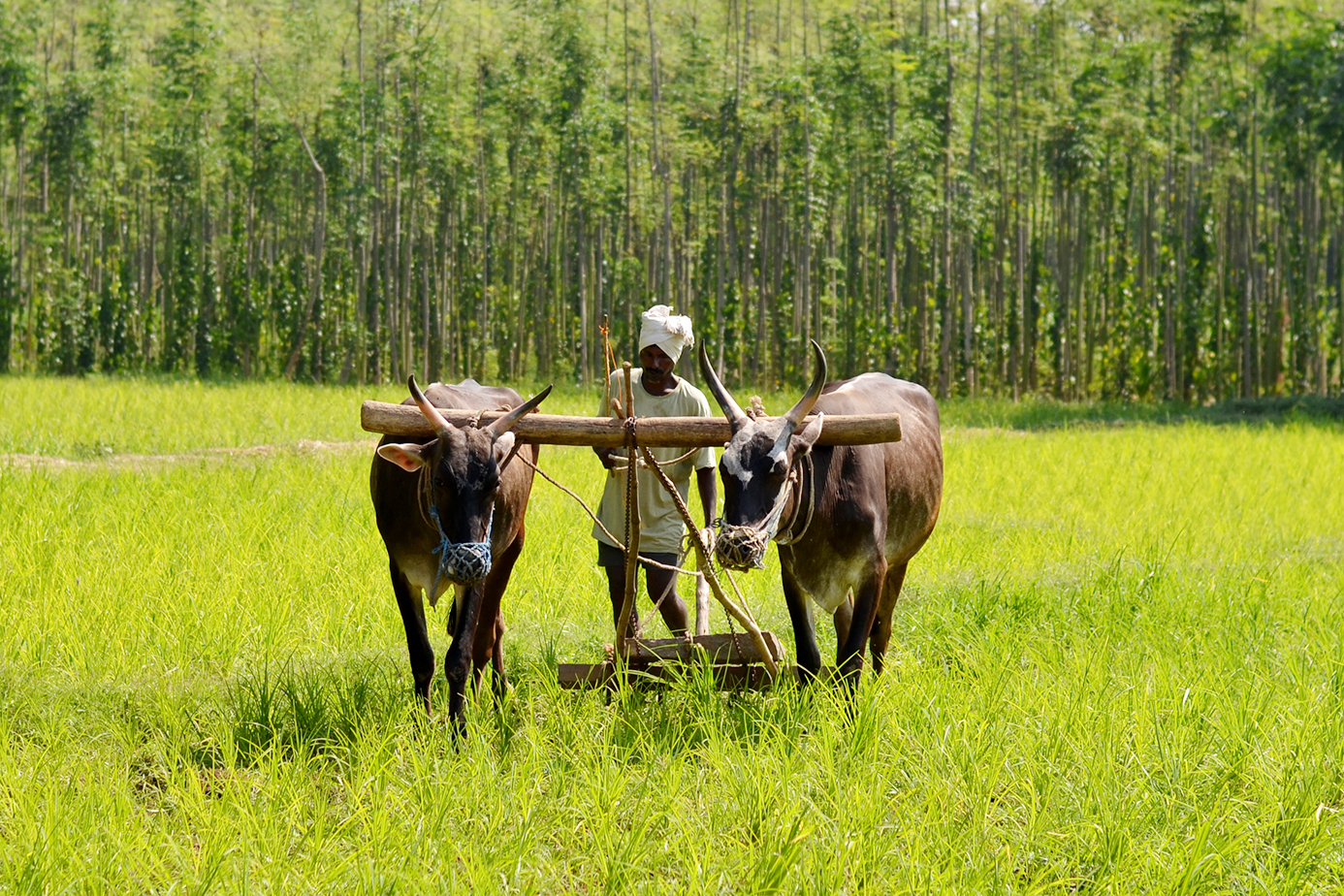
Indian agriculture includes a mix of traditional to modern farming techniques. In some parts of India, traditional use of cattle to plough remains in use. Traditional farms have some of the lowest per capita productivities and farmer incomes.

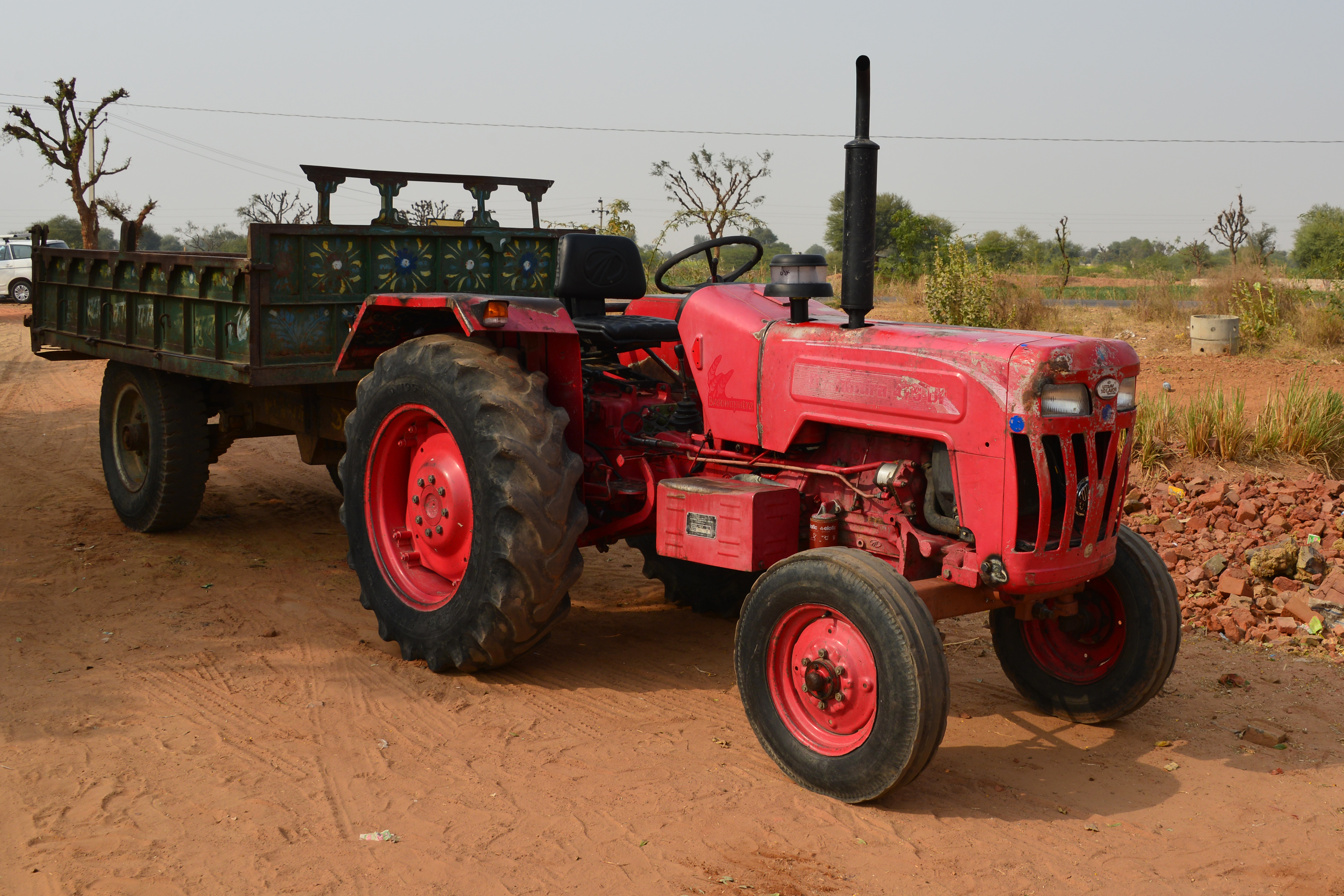
Since 2002, India has become the world's largest manufacturer of tractors with 29% of world's output in 2013; it is also the world's largest tractor market. Above, a tractor in Rewari, Haryana.

"Slow agricultural growth is a concern for policymakers as some two-thirds of India's people depend on rural employment for a living. Current agricultural practices are neither economically nor environmentally sustainable and India's yields for many agricultural commodities are low. Poorly maintained irrigation systems and almost universal lack of good extension services are among the factors responsible. Farmers' access to markets is hampered by poor roads, rudimentary market infrastructure, and excessive regulation."

— World Bank: "India Country Overview 2008"

"With a population of just over 1.3 billion, India is the world's largest democracy. In the past decade, the country has witnessed accelerated economic growth, emerged as a global player with the world's fourth largest economy in purchasing power parity terms, and made progress towards achieving most of the Millennium Development Goals. India's integration into the global economy has been accompanied by impressive economic growth that has brought significant economic and social benefits to the country. Nevertheless, disparities in income and human development are on the rise. Preliminary estimates suggest that in 2009–10 the combined all India poverty rate was 32 % compared to 37 % in 2004–05. Going forward, it will be essential for India to build a productive, competitive, and diversified agricultural sector and facilitate rural, non-farm entrepreneurship and employment. Encouraging policies that promote competition in agricultural marketing will ensure that farmers receive better prices."

— World Bank: "India Country Overview 2011"

A 2003 analysis of India's agricultural growth from 1970 to 2001 by the Food and Agriculture Organization identified systemic problems in Indian agriculture. For food staples, the annual growth rate in production during the six-year segments 1970–76, 1976–82, 1982–88, 1988–1994, 1994–2000 were found to be respectively 2.5, 2.5, 3.0, 2.6, and 1.8% per annum. Corresponding analyses for the index of total agricultural production show a similar pattern, with the growth rate for 1994–2000 attaining only 1.5% per annum.

The biggest problem of farmers is the low price for their farm produce. A recent study showed that proper pricing based on energy of production and equating farming wages to Industrial wages may be beneficial for the farmers.

=== Infrastructure ===
India has very poor rural roads affecting timely supply of inputs and timely transfer of outputs from Indian farms. Irrigation systems are inadequate, leading to crop failures in some parts of the country because of lack of water. In other areas regional floods, poor seed quality and inefficient farming practices, lack of cold storage and harvest spoilage cause over 30% of farmer's produce going to waste, lack of organised retail and competing buyers thereby limiting Indian farmer's ability to sell the surplus and commercial crops.

The Indian farmer receives just 10% to 23% of the price the Indian consumer pays for exactly the same produce, the difference going to losses, inefficiencies and middlemen. Farmers in developed economies of Europe and the United States receive 64% to 81%.

=== Farmer suicides ===
In 2012, the National Crime Records Bureau of India reported 13,754 farmer suicides. Farmer suicides account for 11.2% of all suicides in India. Activists and scholars have offered a number of conflicting reasons for farmer suicides, such as monsoon failure, high debt burdens, genetically modified crops, government policies, public mental health, personal issues and family problems.

According to an NCRB data, in 2022, India saw 11,290 suicides in the farming sector. This was a 3.75 per cent rise from the 10,881 suicides in 2021. In 2022, there were 5,207 farmers suicides compared to 5,318 in 2021. There were 6,083 suicides of farm labourers in 2022, as compared to 5,563 in 2021.

=== Marketing ===
Agromarketing is poorly developed in India.

=== Diversion of agricultural land for non-agricultural purpose ===
Indian National Policy for Farmers of 2007 stated that "prime farmland must be conserved for agriculture except under exceptional circumstances, provided that the agencies that are provided with agricultural land for non-agricultural projects should compensate for treatment and full development of equivalent degraded or wastelands elsewhere". The policy suggested that, as far as possible, land with low farming yields or that was not farmable should be earmarked for non-agricultural purposes such as construction, industrial parks and other commercial development.

Amartya Sen offered a counter viewpoint, stating that "prohibiting the use of agricultural land for commercial and industrial development is ultimately self-defeating". He stated that agricultural land may be better suited for non-agriculture purposes if industrial production could generate many times more than the value of the product produced by agriculture. Sen suggested India needed to bring productive industry everywhere, wherever there are advantages of production, market needs and the locational preferences of managers, engineers, technical experts as well as unskilled labour because of education, healthcare and other infrastructure. He stated that instead of government controlling land allocation based on soil characteristics, the market economy should determine productive allocation of land.

=== Health risk from excessive use of pesticides and fertilisers ===
Pesticides and fertilizers used in Indian agriculture have helped increase crop productivity, but their unregulated and excessive use has caused different ecosystem and fatal health problems. Several studies published between 2011 and 2020 attribute 45 different types of cancers afflicting rural farm workers in India to pesticide usage. The chemicals have been shown to cause DNA damage, hormone disruption, and lead to a weakened immune system. Occupational exposure to pesticides has been identified as a major trigger of the development of cancer. The principal classes of pesticides investigated in relation to their role in intoxication and cancer were insecticides, herbicides, and fungicides. Punjab, a state in India, utilises the highest amount of chemical fertilizers in the country. Many of the pesticides sprayed on the state's crops are classified as class I by the World Health Organization because of their acute toxicity and are banned in places around the world, including Europe.

== Climate change ==
Climate change in India will have disproportionate ramifications for the more than 400 million that make up India's poor community. This is because so many depend on natural resources for their food, shelter and income. Indian farmers are the first to feel the economic effects of climate change since 85% of Indian farmers have low financial resilience. More than 56% of people in India work in agriculture, while many others earn their living in coastal areas.

The effects of climate change on Indian agriculture were investigated through the National Innovations in Climate Resilient Agriculture (NICRA) study. The findings indicate that rain-fed rice yields in India are expected to experience a marginal reduction of less than 2.5% in the years 2050 and 2080. On the other hand, irrigated rice yields are projected to decline by 7% in 2050 and 10% in 2080 scenarios. Moreover, the study forecasts a decrease in wheat yield ranging from 6% to 25% in the year 2100, while maize yields are estimated to decrease by 18% to 23% during the same period. However, there is a potential positive effect on chickpea, with anticipated productivity increases of 23% to 54% in the future climates.

== Initiatives ==
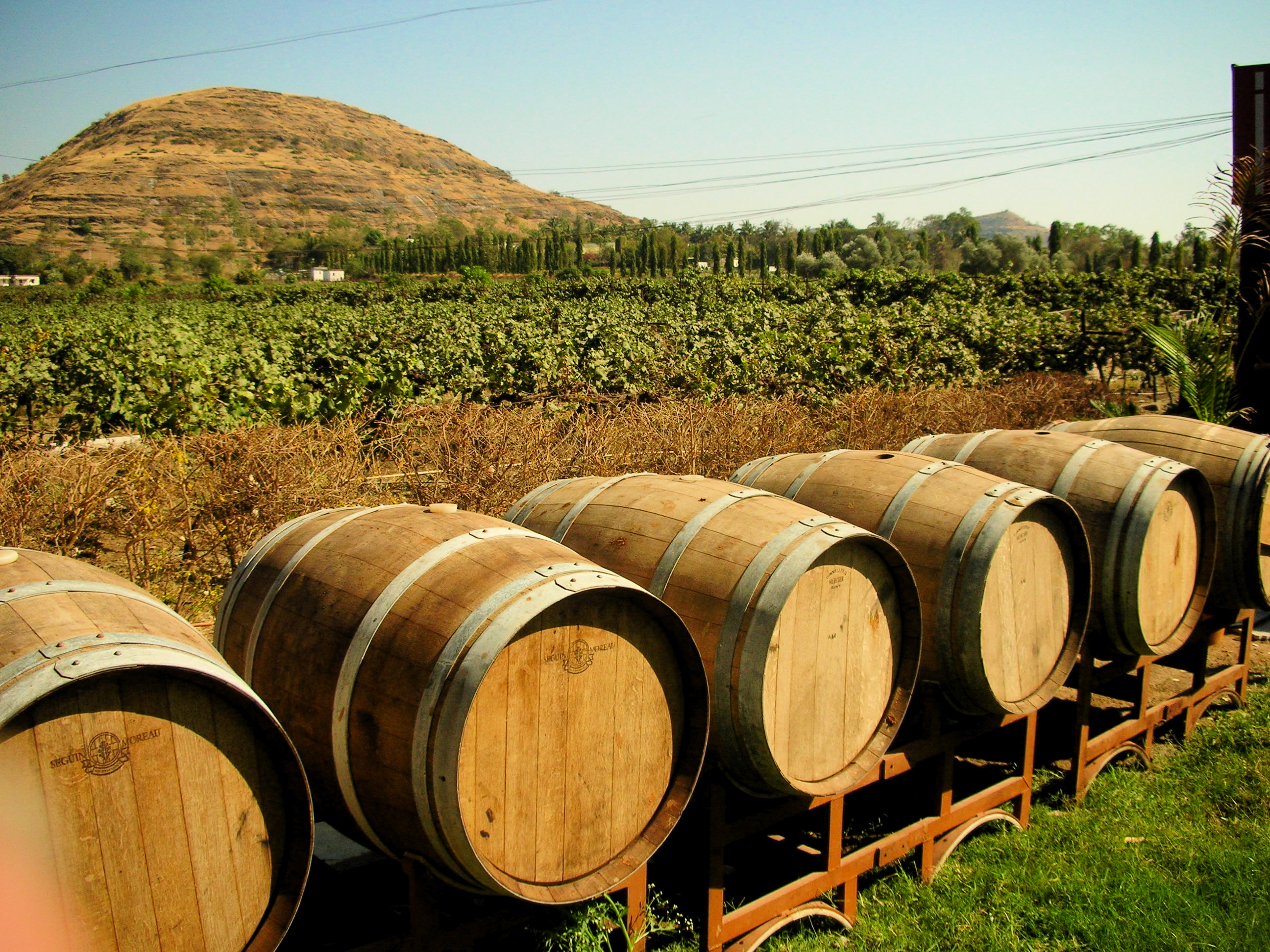
Viticulture farms in Maharashtra

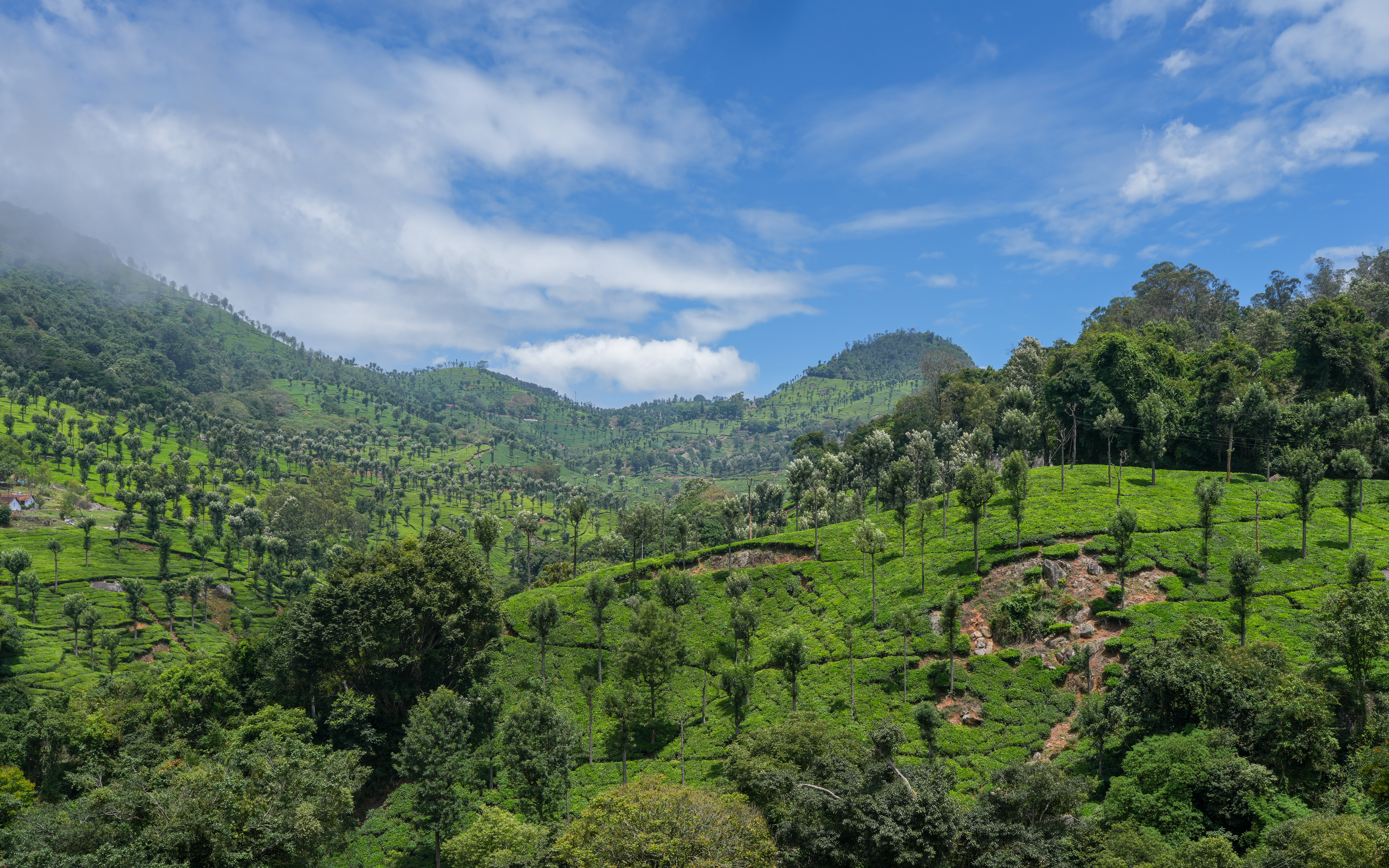
Tea plantation in Tamil Nadu

The required level of investment for the development of marketing, storage and cold storage infrastructure is estimated to be huge. The government has not been able to implement schemes to raise investment in marketing infrastructure. Among these schemes are 'Construction of Rural Godowns', 'Market Research and Information Network', and 'Development / Strengthening of Agricultural Marketing Infrastructure, Grading and Standardisation'.

The Indian Council of Agricultural Research (ICAR), established in 1905, was responsible for the search leading to the "Indian Green Revolution" of the 1970s. The ICAR is the apex body in agriculture and related allied fields, including research and education. The Union Minister of Agriculture is the president of the ICAR. The Indian Agricultural Statistics Research Institute develops new techniques for the design of agricultural experiments, analyses data in agriculture, and specialises in statistical techniques for animal and plant breeding.

Recently (May 2016) the government of India has set up the Farmers Commission to completely evaluate the agriculture programme. Its recommendations have had a mixed reception.

In November 2011, India announced major reforms in organised retail. These reforms would include logistics and retail of agricultural produce. The announcement led to major political controversy. The reforms were placed on hold by the government in December 2011.

In the summer of 2012, the subsidised electricity for pumping, which has caused an alarming drop in aquifer levels, put additional strain on the country's electrical grid due to a 19% drop in monsoon rains and may have contributed to a blackout across much of the country. In response the state of Bihar offered farmers over $100 million in subsidised diesel to operate their pumps.

In 2015, Narendra Modi announced to double farmer's income by 2022.

Startups with niche technology and new business models are working to solve problems in Indian agriculture and its marketing. Kandawale is one such e-commerce website which sells Indian red onions to bulk users direct from farmers, reducing unnecessary cost escalations.

Personalised e-commerce stores and market places have brought farming products like fertilizers, seeds, machines and equipment that help farmers grow products. Educational portals let farmers know things about farming that increase the contributions of agriculture to the economy.

== Organic and natural farming ==
Organic agriculture is the practice of using ecologically based manures and compost to cultivate food. It prohibits the use of any synthetic fertilizers, pesticides, or genetically modified organisms. Organic farming was the norm in India for most of its history, but significant population growth in the mid-20th century forced farmers to find new ways to provide enough food to support the country. M. S. Swaminathan, an agricultural scientist, led an initiative known as the Green Revolution to integrate new technology into existing Indian agrarian practices to increase the farms' yields and general productivity. India began to adopt synthetic fertilizers, pesticides, and new irrigation technology to accomplish this goal. The revolution slowly decreased the frequency of organic farming.

=== Historical initiatives ===
The Green Revolution's shift to new farming methods, such as irrigation and synthetic fertilizers, led to negative effects on the environment. The rise of commercial farms to support the Indian population, coupled with demands from other countries, resulted in mass deforestation. Excess water from irrigation systems collects toxic chemicals from pesticides, leading to runoff into streams that kills wildlife and pollutes freshwater sources. These and other effects have prompted concerns about the sustainability of non-organic farming, thereby raising awareness about the importance of adopting more sustainable organic farming practices.

One leader of this development was Sir Albert Howard. He was an English botanist who helped advance organic agricultural developments through numerous publications on sustainable organic farming methods in India. He raised awareness about the adverse effects of non-organic farming on the environment and helped educate the Indian population about the benefits of organic farming. His work and contributions to the field of organic agriculture led him to be known as the founder of the organic farming movement.

=== Recent initiatives ===
With the recent concerns about non-organic farming practices and their possibly adverse health effects, there has been a noticeable increase in demand for organic food in India. As more people notice the negative effects of non-organic farming on sustainability, it contributes to grow the organic farming movement. The Government of India is also playing an active role in promoting organic agriculture, as its various initiatives, like Paramparagat Krishi Vikas Yojana and zero-budget natural farming, are making organic farming more accessible and sustainable. Most initiatives now focus on how organic agriculture can lead to improvements in the country's sustainability.

Paramparagat Krishi Vikas Yojana (PKVY) was launched in 2015 by the Narendra Modi regime to promote organic farming, under which farmers form organic farming clusters of 50 or more farmers with a minimum total area of 20 hectares (50 acres) to share organic methods using traditional sustainable methods, costs, and marketing, etc. It initially aimed to have 10,000 clusters by 2018 with at least 200,000 hectares (500,000 acres) under organic farming. It also aimed for the government to cover certification costs while promoting the use of traditional resources in organic farming. The government provides ₹49,000 per hectare (₹20,000 per acre) or US$701.8 per hectare (US$284.01 per acre) benefit over three years.

Other techniques of organic farming like zero budget natural farming (ZBNF) have been implemented by many small-scale farmers in Wayanad, Kerala. In this process they implement more natural and ecological methods of farming that decrease or completely cease use of pesticides and damaging chemicals. This alleviates damage caused by chemical overuse and mono cropping which is depleting the formerly fertile forest-land in the area.

One specific initiative is increasing the availability of organic farming in Tamil Nadu. The Government of Tamil Nadu has been publishing resources for farmers in the state to reduce their dependence on chemical fertilizers like Diammonium Phosphate and Urea. One specific resource outlines the creation of micro-compositing centres, also known as decentralised compositing centres. These are centres all around Tamil Nadu that turn people's trash into compost and cleaning supplies.

An example of an existing centre is Chennai Composting Center. This is a Micro Composting Center that repurposes one ton of trash and turns it into organic compost every day for large suppliers and farms around Chennai. By repurposing trash into compost to reduce fertilizer use in the area, Chennai Composting Center is creating a more sustainable agricultural community.

Along with progression with organic farming methods, new technologies in the form of moisture sensors and artificial intelligence are also being implemented in the Indian farming sector. Farmers are using moisture sensors to ensure that different crops have the exact amount of water that they need, which ensures that farmers can maximise crop yield. Along with this, artificial intelligence techniques are being implemented in food processing plants across India. AI provides more efficient ways to produce, harvest, and sell crops products as well as an emphasis on checking defective crops and improving the potential for healthy crop production. This further helps maximise crop yield as Rayda Ayed describes in her research on the effects of artificial intelligence in India.

Organic farming practices are currently having a positive effect on India's environment and will further improve the country's sustainability if continued. Specifically, it has a direct link to improving the economic sustainability of non-commercial farmers. Organic farmers can sell products on a small scale at a higher price than non-organic products. This enables them to increase their earnings on food sales and achieve greater economic sustainability. Further, organic farming is also creating more jobs in rural areas, as organic farms require more labour compared to non-organic ones.

This applies to two specific fertilizers used in India, Urea and Diammonium Phosphate (DAP). Urea is the most imported fertiliser in India, and it has many adverse health effects on those who use it. When these fertilizers come into contact with uncovered skin, they can cause irritation and, if left untreated, lead to skin damage. Diammonium Phosphate also causes similar effects when it comes into contact with uncovered skin and eyes. Skin irritation comes from these fertilizers releasing compounds such as ammonia and nitrogen oxides, which are harmful to both the human body and the soil they are applied to.

Regarding the environment, Urea, Diammonium Phosphate, and other fertilizers in India increase atmospheric nitrogen levels and strip soil of its nutrients. When these fertilizers are spread along farms, they react with water and release ammonia, which increases the amount of nitrogen in the air, and carbon dioxide into the atmosphere. This causes air and soil pollution, with adverse long-term effects. The continued use of these fertilizers is damaging India's environment.

In terms of environmental sustainability, organic farms do not use any artificial pesticides or fertilizers. This means that there is no toxic runoff or other environmentally damaging effects from organic farms. Avoiding these dangerous chemicals also leads to a healthier environment for farmers, as they do not have to deal with any threatening chemicals.

=== Current status ===
Due to the Green Revolution, a large majority of farmland in India is not organic. Most Indian farmland is concentrated in large commercial farms that prioritise high yields and maximum economic gain. Organic farmland occupies around 2% of all farmland in India, which is most commonly divided into many small subsistence farms. Despite this, India still holds the ninth most organic farmland in the world.

There are several reasons why only a few large-scale organic farms exist in India. Organic farming requires more land, materials, and labour to achieve the same production levels as non-organic farms, so large-scale organic farming is highly inefficient. Organic agriculture is more expensive and time-consuming compared to conventional farming practices, which further explains the lack of large organic farms.

Organic agriculture has fed India for centuries and it is again a growing sector in India. Organic production offers clean and green production methods without the use of synthetic fertilisers and pesticides and it achieves a premium price in the market place. India has 650,000 organic producers, which is more than any other country. India also has 4 million hectares of land certified as organic wildculture, which is third in the world (after Finland and Zambia). As non-availability of edible biomass is impeding the growth of animal husbandry in India, organic production of protein-rich cattle, fish, and poultry feed using biogas/methane/natural gas by cultivating Methylococcus capsulatus bacteria with a tiny land and water footprint is a solution for ensuring adequate protein-rich food to the population.

=== The future of organic agriculture ===
Organic farming has both advantages and disadvantages. The advantage is that, organic farming's high levels of sustainability offer it a promising future. Organic farms contribute to safer and healthier lives for both farmers and consumers due to their lack of dangerous chemicals, making the industry's projected outlook long-lasting and promising.

On the other hand, organic farms have some adverse effects. For example, organic farms have lower yields compared to non-organic farms. Compensating for this issue results in organic farmers cultivating more land to produce similar amounts of crops. This leads to deforestation, which is not sustainable. The ideal form of agriculture in India calls for a combination of both organic and non-organic farming techniques to maximise yields while promoting economic and environmental sustainability.

== Government schemes ==
- 2020 Indian agriculture acts
- Atal Bhujal Yojana
- E-NAM for online agrimarketing
- Gramin Bhandaran Yojana for local storage
- Micro Irrigation Fund (MIF)
- National Mission For Sustainable Agriculture (NMSA)
- National Scheme on Fisheries Training and Extension
- National Scheme on Welfare of Fishermen
- Pradhan Mantri Kisan Samman Nidhi (PMKSN) for income support
- Pradhan Mantri Krishi Sinchai Yojana (PMKSY) for irrigation
- Paramparagat Krishi Vikas Yojana (PKVY) for organic farming
- Pradhan Mantri Fasal Bima Yojana (PMFBY) for crop insurance

== Maps ==
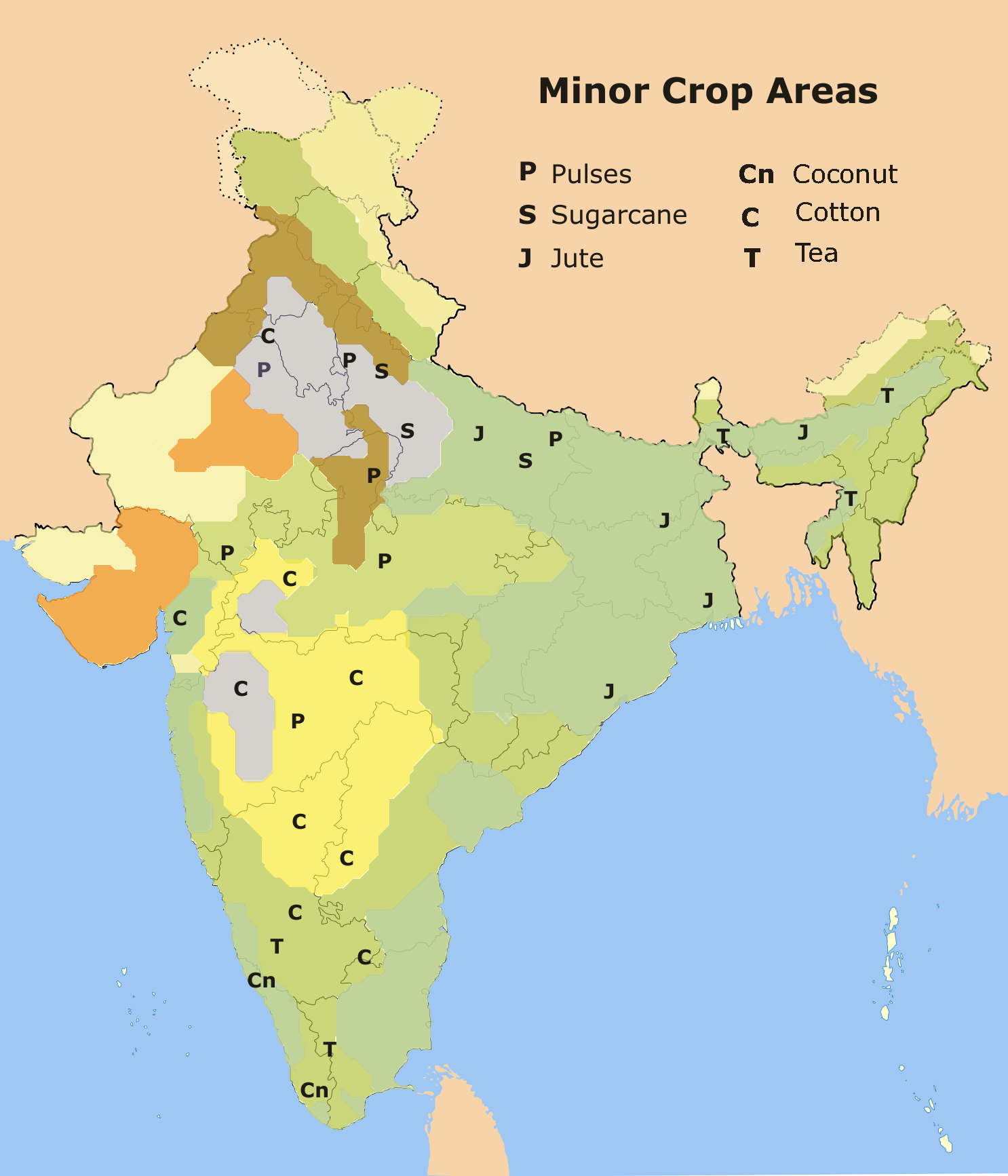
Minor crop areas in India: P pulses, S sugarcane, J jute, Cn coconut, C cotton, and T tea

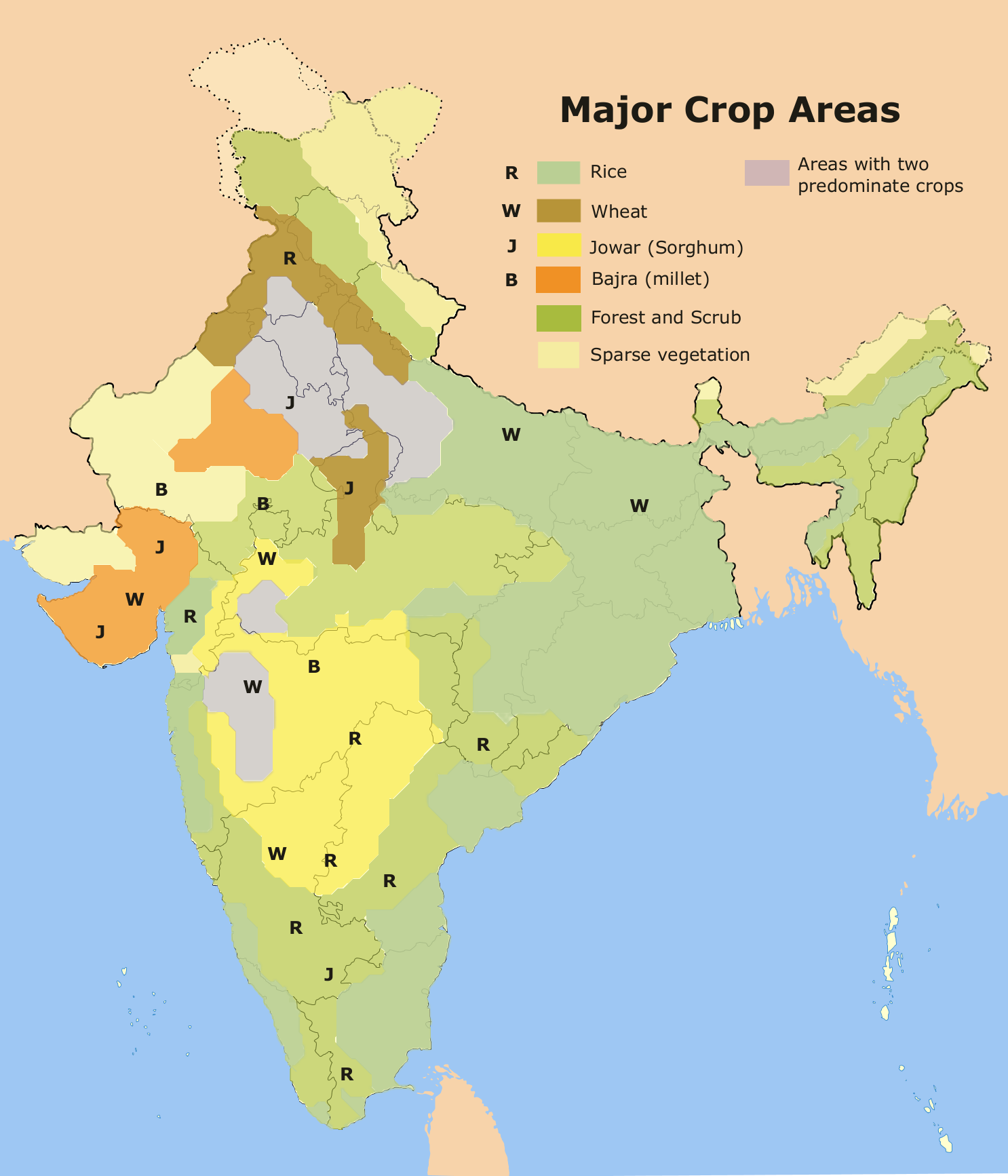
Major crop areas in India

Natural vegetation zones in India

== See also ==
- 2020 Indian agriculture acts
- Animal husbandry in India
- Beekeeping in India
- Biotechnology in India
- Farmers' suicides in India
- Farming systems in India
- Fishing in India
- List of banned and restricted pesticides in India
- Health effects of pesticides
- Environmental impact of pesticides
- Irrigation in India
- List of countries by employment in agriculture
- Pesticide poisoning
- Retailing in India
- Rice production in India
- Rural roads and infrastructure in India
- Women in agriculture in India

== Bibliography ==
- George A. Grierson (1885). Bihar Peasant Life. Bengal Secretariat Press, Calcutta.
