= Dragon fruit farming in India =

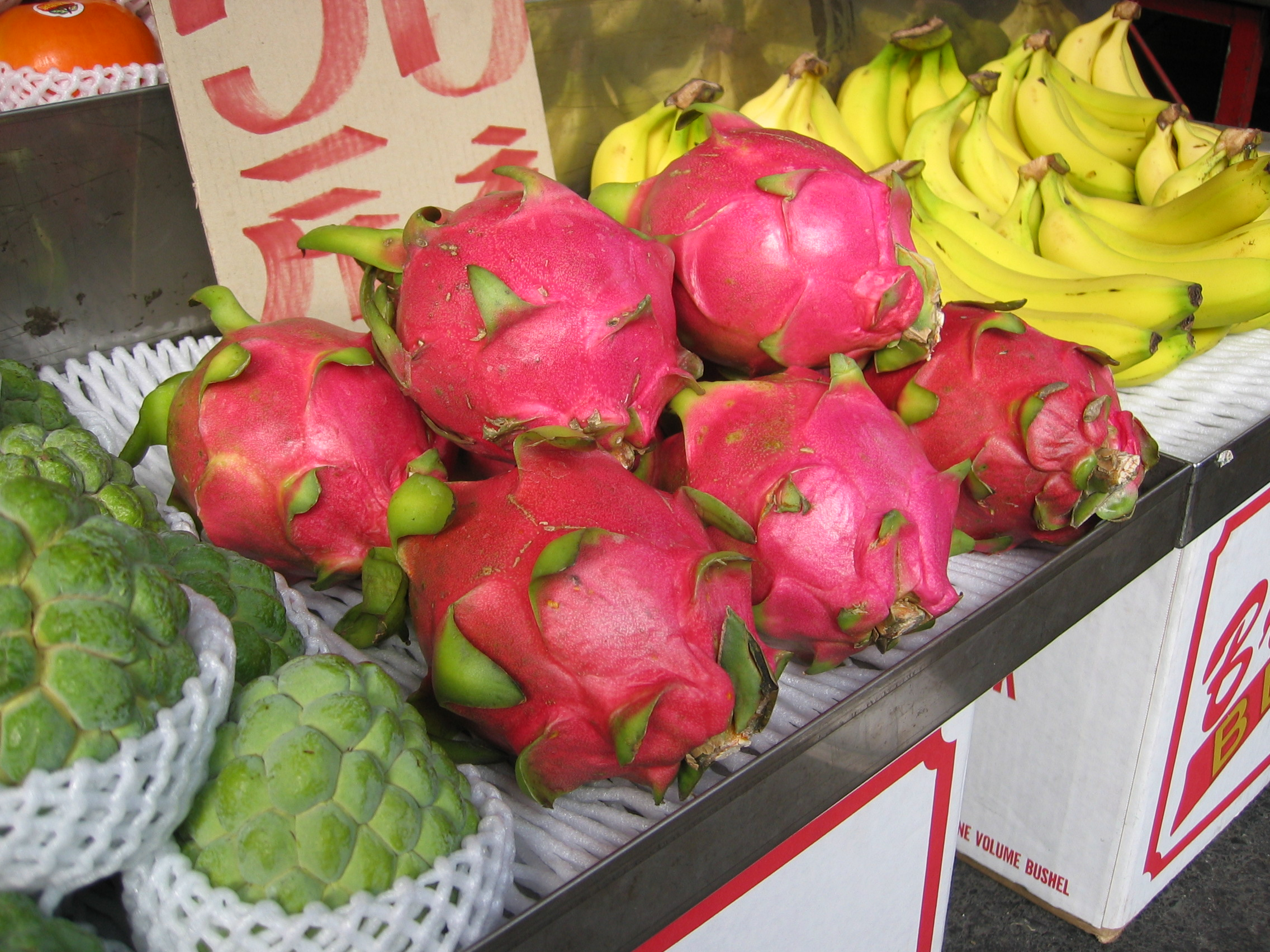
Dragon fruits on sale

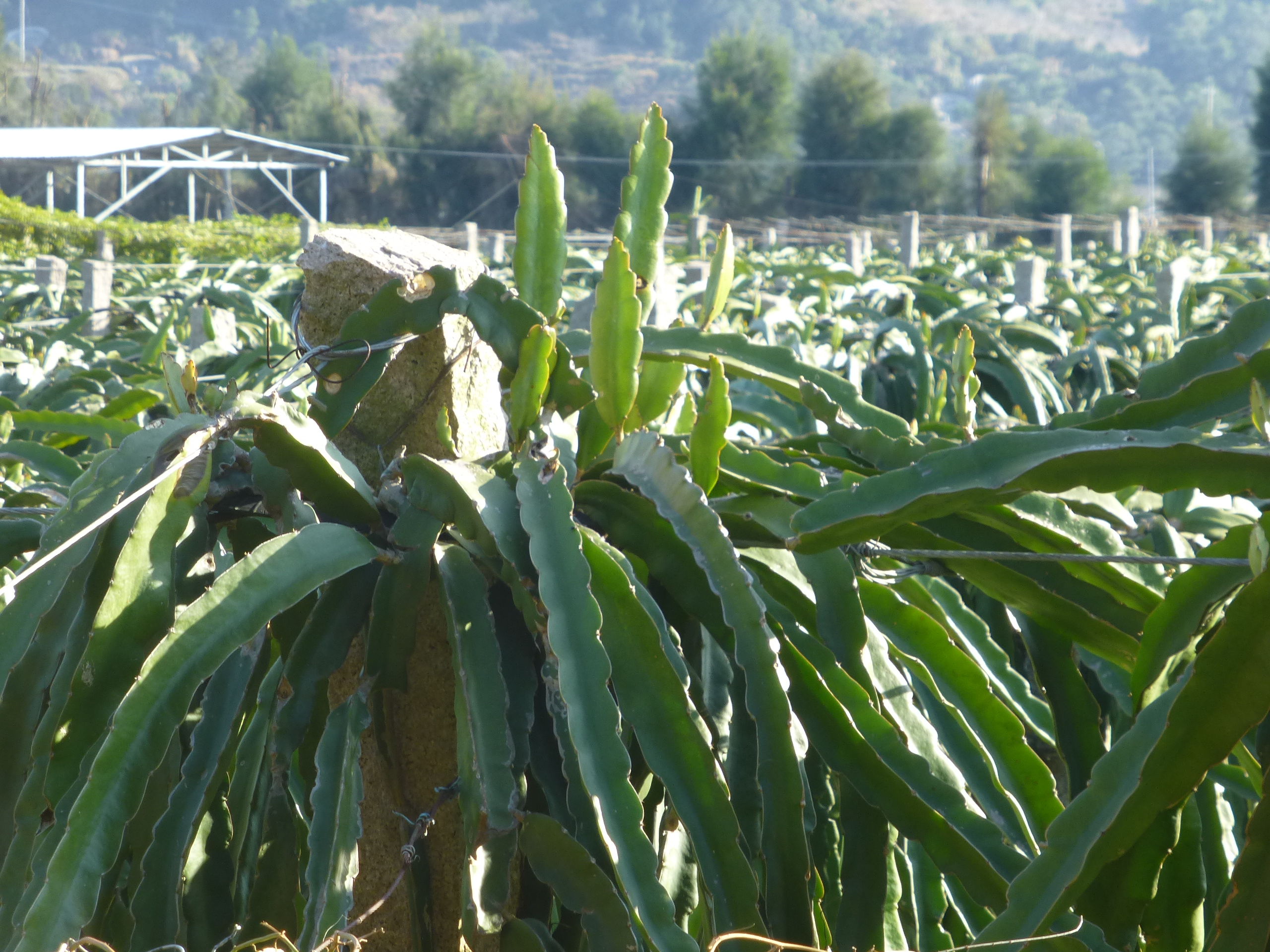
A dragon fruit farm

Dragon fruit (Hylocereus spp.), a herbaceous perennial climbing cactus, has gained attention in India due to its attractive red or pink color, economic value, and high antioxidant potential, vitamins, and minerals content. Introduced in the late 1990s, dragon fruit cultivation in the Indian states of Karnataka, Kerala, Tamil Nadu, Maharashtra, Gujarat, Orissa, West Bengal, Andhra Pradesh, and Andaman & Nicobar Islands has grown rapidly, with an estimated total area under cultivation in these regions being less than 400. The majority of dragon fruits in Indian markets are imported from Vietnam, Thailand, Malaysia, and Sri Lanka.

The cultivation area of Dragon fruit, also known as the Kamalam, is expected to expand to 50,000 hectares in 2028 under the Mission for Integrated Development of Horticulture (MIDH) scheme. The fruit, which has gained attention worldwide due to its red purple color and economic value, is being cultivated in South-East Asia, India, USA, the Caribbean Islands, and Australia. The Ministry of Agriculture and Farmers' Welfare has approved a Centre of Excellence (CoE) for Kamalam Fruit to be set up at IIHR, Bengaluru, to help make Atmanirbhar Bharat by cutting down on its imports valued at about Rupees 100 crores in 2021. The total area under cultivation of Kamalam in India is more than 3,000 hectares, which is not able to meet the domestic demand. The projected import value for 2021 is about Rupees 100 crores. The crop provides a fast return with economic production in the first year after planting, and full production is attained in 3–4 years. The average economic yield after 2 years of planting is 10 tonnes per acre. With the growing interest in farmers and the quick returns they are getting from the cultivation of Kamalam in agricultural and marginal lands, it is expected that new areas will come up under Kamalam, and the import will be totally substituted through domestic cultivation. Dragon fruit, native to the Americas, is gaining popularity in India due to its low maintenance and high profitability. Farmers cultivate three main varieties, with prices varying in Mumbai, Pune, and Surat markets. To manage sunburn, farmers can provide 25-30% shade and integrate moringa trees in orchards. The Maharashtra government promotes dragon fruit cultivation through subsidies.

== Gujarat ==
Dragon fruit, also known as Kamalam, has been exported to London, the UK, and Bahrain for the first time. Originating from Gujarat and West Bengal. The export has boosted India's exotic fruit exports, with the Ministry of Agriculture aiming to improve farmers' prices. Gujarat, India, has decided to change the name of the dragon fruit, claiming it is associated with China. The fruit's shape is like a lotus, and it has been given a new Sanskrit name, kamalam. The change comes after Prime Minister Narendra Modi praised farmers in a radio programme for cultivating the dragon fruit in the arid region of Kutch in Gujarat. The opposition Congress called the name change a gimmick and criticized the government for diverting attention from real issues. The fruit is also grown in neighbouring Maharashtra state and northeastern India. The opposition Congress has called the name change a gimmick and criticized the government's attempt to divert attention from real issues.

== Punjab ==
Punjab Agricultural University (PAU) has approved and recommended two dragon fruit varieties for cultivation in the state, Red Dragon 1 and White Dragon 1, after five years of evaluation and research in 2023.

== See also ==
- Agriculture in India
