= Francine Frankel =

American political scientist

Francine R. Frankel (born 1935) is the founding director of the Center for the Advanced Study of India and Professor of Political Science at the University of Pennsylvania. An authority on India's politics, economics and foreign policy, she spent 2006-07 at the Woodrow Wilson Center for International Scholars, completing a book on U.S. and India foreign policy using declassified documents and archival sources.

== Education and career ==
Frankel received her PhD from the University of Chicago in 1965, after completing her master's degree from the Johns Hopkins University School of Advanced International Studies in 1958. Additionally, Frankel has been a research scholar at the Nehru Memorial Museum and Library and the Delhi School of Economics in New Delhi, the Institute for Advanced Study in Princeton, and Princeton University.

In 1992, Frankel founded the Center for the Advanced Study of India, the only academic research center in the United States dedicated to the study of India. The Center collaborates with other institutions in the US, India, and elsewhere to pursue its goal of nurturing a new generation of scholars across disciplines and providing a forum for dialogue among the academic, business, and foreign policy communities.

== Books ==
=== Written ===
- Frankel, Francine (1971) India's green revolution: Economic gains and political costs, Princeton University Press.
- Frankel, Francine (1978) India's Political Economy, 1947-1977: The Gradual Revolution, Princeton Univ Press.
- Frankel, Francine (1995) The Nonproliferation Treaty, University Press of America.
- Frankel, Francine (2005) India's Political Economy 1947-2004: The Gradual Revolution, 2nd Edition, Oxford University Press.
- Frankel, Francine (2006) India's Political Economy, Oxford University Press.
- Frankel, Francine (2020) When Nehru Looked East, Oxford University Press.

=== Edited ===
- Frankel, Francine; Rao, M.S.A. (1990) Dominance and State Power in Modern India: Decline of a Social Order, Volume 1, Oxford University Press.
- Frankel, Francine; Rao, M.S.A. (1990) Dominance and State Power in Modern India: Decline of a Social Order, Volume 2, Oxford University Press.
- Frankel, Francine; Hasan Zoya; Bhargava, Rajeev, Arora, Balveer (2002) Transforming India: Social and Political Dynamics of Democracy, Oxford University Press, 2002.
- Frankel, Francine; Harding, Harry (2004) The India-China Relationship: What the United States Needs to Know, Columbia University Press.
