= List of countries by employment in agriculture =

This list shows the employment in agriculture (as percentage of total employment) of various countries in 2023.

== List ==
Country	Employment in agriculture (%)		
Country	Total	Male	Female
Burundi	85.1	77.6	92.0
Niger	70.6	73.6	66.4
Central African Republic	70.5	66.9	74.4
Laos	69.6	69.5	69.8
Mozambique	69.5	58.9	79.2
Madagascar	69.4	70.2	68.5
Chad	69.1	69.2	68.9
Mali	67.8	69.4	65.5
Uganda	65.9	60.8	71.4
Tanzania	65.4	64.0	66.8
Ethiopia	62.4	69.1	53.1
Malawi	61.7	56.9	66.8
Nepal	61.2	54.2	73.5
Eritrea	60.9	58.1	64.0
South Sudan	59.2	46.1	72.7
Guinea	58.2	54.9	63.0
Angola	56.2	52.0	60.5
Equatorial Guinea	55.9	52.1	61.6
Zambia	55.4	52.3	59.1
DR Congo	55.1	46.8	63.7
Rwanda	54.8	46.2	64.7
Zimbabwe	52.5	45.9	59.2
Armenia	52.3	39.2	65.0
Moldova	51.1	49.8	52.2
Guinea-Bissau	50.0	46.3	54.1
North Korea	46.8	41.6	52.4
Afghanistan	45.5	45.3	47.4
Cote d'Ivoire	45.2	50.0	38.8
Myanmar	45.2	49.6	37.9
Haiti	44.7	55.3	31.8
Bhutan	43.8	38.0	52.6
Vanuatu	43.6	43.8	43.4
India	43.5	36.6	61.5
Cameroon	43.4	41.2	46.2
Sierra Leone	43.0	43.8	42.2
Tajikistan	42.7	31.4	59.5
Georgia	39.9	38.2	41.8
Liberia	38.9	36.7	41.2
Papua New Guinea	38.7	36.6	41.0
Solomon Islands	37.6	37.2	37.9
Timor-Leste	36.8	33.0	41.3
Pakistan	36.1	27.4	66.4
Cambodia	36.0	33.9	38.3
Azerbaijan	35.5	30.3	40.8
Ghana	35.4	40.6	29.9
Bangladesh	35.3	25.0	53.1
Albania	34.9	30.8	39.9
Comoros	34.4	34.2	34.7
Nigeria	34.3	42.3	25.6
Vietnam	33.0	31.9	34.1
Mauritania	32.7	34.3	29.3
Kenya	32.3	30.5	34.2
Burkina Faso	31.4	33.6	28.5
Togo	30.3	35.2	25.0
Samoa	30.2	36.8	18.1
Congo	30.2	30.4	29.9
Thailand	30.1	33.1	26.6
Ecuador	30.0	31.7	27.6
Morocco	29.6	24.6	47.5
Lesotho	29.2	37.8	17.7
Gabon	29.2	21.9	42.3
Gambia	29.1	17.8	40.9
Indonesia	28.8	30.5	26.1
Yemen	28.6	27.4	45.6
Fiji	28.1	32.8	18.9
Benin	28.0	40.6	15.1
Nicaragua	27.7	40.4	8.0
Guatemala	26.7	35.6	9.3
Tonga	26.3	37.6	11.8
Sri Lanka	26.3	26.3	26.2
Mongolia	26.1	28.1	23.7
World	26.1	26.2	25.9
Somalia	26.0	25.1	28.2
Bolivia	24.4	24.2	24.6
Peru	24.0	25.3	22.3
Kyrgyzstan	23.9	17.8	32.3
Honduras	22.6	31.3	5.2
Philippines	22.4	27.8	14.7
China	22.3	25.4	18.6
Turkmenistan	22.2	23.3	21.3
Senegal	21.6	24.6	16.5
Namibia	21.5	23.3	19.7
Serbia	19.2	19.5	18.7
South Africa	18.8	18.0	19.8
Egypt	18.7	19.1	16.8
Botswana	18.0	26.4	7.5
Romania	17.9	18.6	17.0
Bosnia and Herzegovina	17.6	13.9	22.8
Paraguay	17.2	21.4	11.2
Cuba	17.1	23.6	6.8
Belize	15.6	22.2	4.7
Syria	15.0	16.3	8.1
El Salvador	14.8	22.1	4.4
Panama	14.7	18.9	8.5
Turkey	14.6	12.8	18.5
Jamaica	14.6	19.6	8.6
Colombia	14.4	20.2	6.0
Iran	14.3	14.4	13.8
Uzbekistan	13.9	13.1	15.3
Eswatini	13.8	17.2	10.0
Costa Rica	13.4	17.0	7.7
Tunisia	12.8	14.3	9.2
Kazakhstan	12.1	13.5	10.7
Mexico	12.0	16.8	4.8
Greece	11.5	12.7	9.8
Guyana	11.3	16.3	4.2
Sao Tome and Principe	11.1	11.8	10.4
Venezuela	10.6	14.8	3.4
St. Lucia	10.4	16.4	3.3
Belarus	10.0	13.0	6.9
Cape Verde	9.9	13.7	4.9
Malaysia	9.8	12.3	5.7
St. Vincent and the Grenadines	9.6	14.0	3.6
Algeria	9.3	10.4	3.2
North Macedonia	9.3	10.2	8.1
Uruguay	8.7	12.4	4.4
Libya	8.7	9.5	6.9
Iraq	8.2	7.6	13.7
Brazil	8.2	11.7	3.5
Maldives	7.7	9.4	2.1
Poland	7.6	8.9	6.1
Dominican Republic	7.4	11.4	1.3
Suriname	7.4	8.5	5.7
Latvia	6.8	9.6	3.9
Chile	6.2	8.4	3.2
Oman	6.1	6.9	1.6
Montenegro	6.0	6.8	5.1
Russia	5.7	7.5	3.8
Bulgaria	5.7	7.5	3.6
New Zealand	5.6	6.9	4.2
South Korea	5.3	5.8	4.7
Mauritius	5.3	6.6	3.2
Lithuania	5.1	6.7	3.4
Croatia	4.7	5.9	3.3
Hungary	4.4	6.1	2.6
Slovenia	4.0	4.6	3.4
Ireland	4.0	6.5	1.3
European Union	3.8	4.8	2.6
Iceland	3.7	5.2	1.9
Spain	3.6	5.1	1.9
Finland	3.6	5.4	1.7
Italy	3.6	4.6	2.2
Lebanon	3.4	4.3	1.4
Jordan	3.2	3.6	1.0
Austria	3.1	3.6	2.6
Japan	3.0	3.5	2.4
Portugal	2.9	4.1	1.7
Trinidad and Tobago	2.9	4.0	1.5
Bahamas	2.9	4.5	1.2
Saudi Arabia	2.8	3.3	0.4
Czechia	2.7	3.5	1.8
Barbados	2.6	4.2	1.1
Estonia	2.6	4.0	1.2
France	2.5	3.4	1.6
Norway	2.5	3.6	1.3
Slovakia	2.4	3.3	1.3
Cyprus	2.4	3.7	0.8
Channel Islands	2.3	3.1	1.3
Australia	2.1	2.7	1.5
French Polynesia	2.1	2.7	1.3
Denmark	2.0	3.0	1.0
Kuwait	1.9	2.5	0.2
Netherlands	1.9	2.4	1.3
Switzerland	1.9	2.4	1.4
New Caledonia	1.8	2.3	1.3
Sweden	1.8	2.6	0.8
Qatar	1.7	2.1	0.0
United States	1.6	2.1	1.0
Brunei	1.5	1.9	0.9
United Arab Emirates	1.3	1.7	0.0
Virgin Islands (U.S.)	1.3	2.2	0.4
Canada	1.3	1.7	0.8
Germany	1.2	1.5	0.8
Puerto Rico	1.2	2.0	0.1
Djibouti	1.1	1.3	0.8
Malta	1.1	1.6	0.4
Belgium	1.1	1.5	0.7
United Kingdom	1.0	1.4	0.6
Bahrain	0.9	1.1	0.0
Luxembourg	0.9	1.2	0.5
Israel	0.8	1.1	0.4
Argentina	0.6	0.8	0.4
Macao	0.5	0.5	0.5
Guam	0.2	0.3	0.1
Hong Kong	0.2	0.3	0.1
Singapore	0.1	0.1	0.1
