= List of countries by apple production =

Apple production

Apple output in 2005

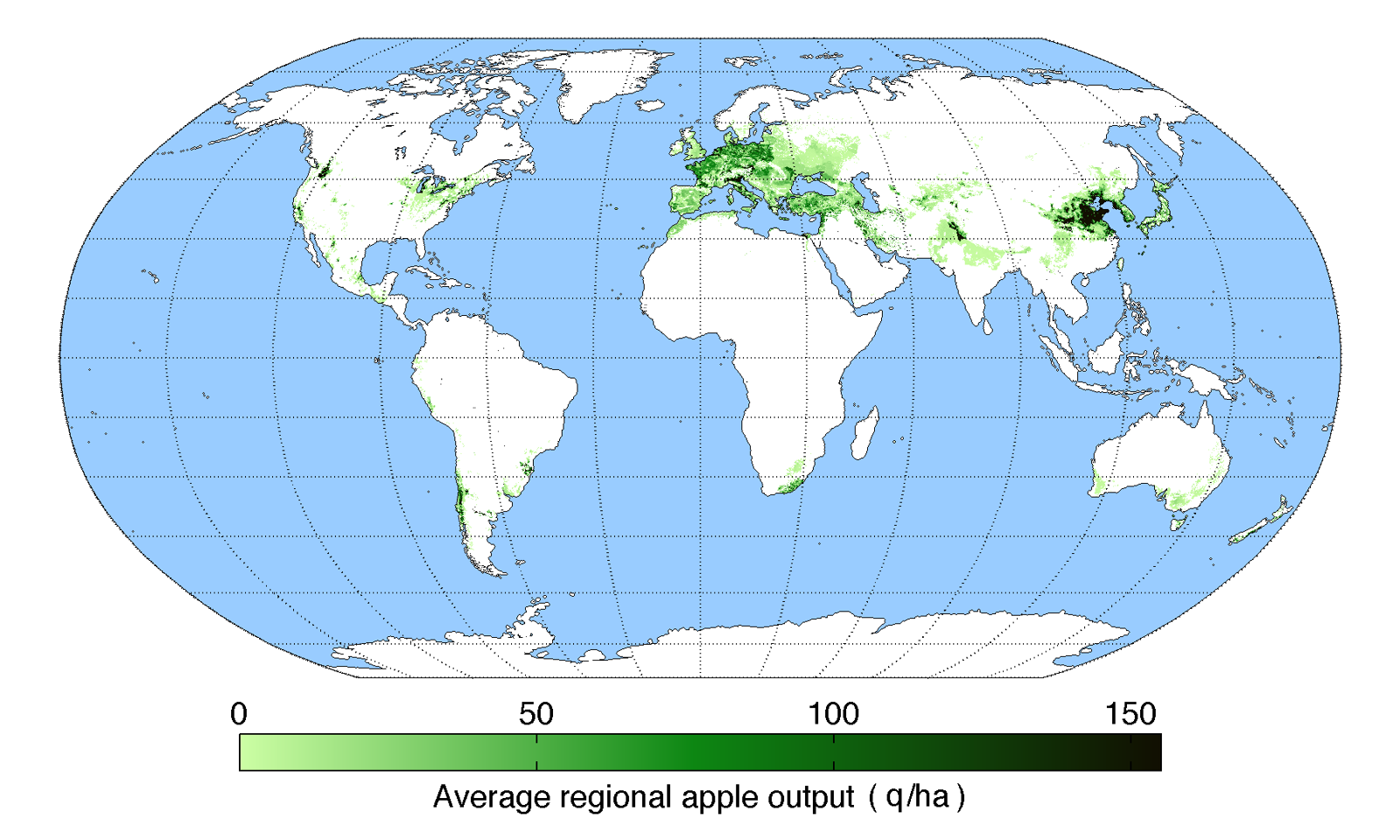
Apple producing regions in 2000

This is a list of countries by apple production in 2019, 2020, 2021 and 2022 based on data from the Food and Agriculture Organization Corporate Statistical Database The estimated total world production of apples in 2022 was 95,835,965 metric tonnes, up 2.0% from 93,924,721 tonnes in 2021.

== List of countries by production quantity ==
=== >1,000,000 tonnes ===
Rank	Country/region	2022	2021	2020	2019
–	World	95,835,965	93,924,721	90,603,540	87,462,289
1	China	47,571,800	45,983,400	44,066,100	42,425,400
2	Turkey	4,817,500	4,493,264	4,300,486	3,618,752
3	United States	4,429,330	4,505,310	4,665,199	5,028,526
4	Poland	4,264,700	4,067,400	3,555,200	3,080,600
5	India	2,589,000	2,276,000	2,814,000	2,316,000
6	Russia	2,379,900	2,215,300	2,040,700	1,950,800
7	Italy	2,256,240	2,211,740	2,462,440	2,303,690
8	Iran	1,989,734	2,767,822	2,241,100	2,241,124
9	France	1,785,660	1,633,080	1,743,360	1,753,500
10	Chile	1,479,683	1,561,452	1,612,626	1,607,826
11	Uzbekistan	1,313,233	1,238,188	1,148,455	1,124,017
12	South Africa	1,231,867	1,148,771	998,785	895,399
13	Ukraine	1,129,120	1,278,870	1,114,570	1,153,970
14	Germany	1,070,980	1,004,630	1,023,320	991,450
15	Brazil	1,047,217	1,297,424	983,255	1,222,949

=== 100,000–1,000,000 tonnes ===
Rank	Country/region	2022	2021	2020	2019
16	Egypt	934,414	863,370	751,200	701,435
17	Morocco	922,820	889,736	778,866	809,762
18	Mexico	817,806	631,767	714,203	761,483
19	North Korea	801,533	798,587	795,642	792,079
20	Pakistan	758,298	732,287	671,716	603,922
21	Japan	737,100	661,900	763,300	701,600
22	New Zealand	575,553	567,162	559,926	555,627
23	South Korea	566,041	515,931	422,115	535,324
24	United Kingdom	555,998	463,593	631,597	610,444
25	Romania	543,380	593,700	537,470	492,700
26	Algeria	539,852	522,317	566,824	558,830
27	Belarus	532,700	532,700	532,655	336,697
28	Spain	496,305	615,830	522,100	638,840
29	Serbia	486,215	513,238	489,426	499,578
30	Moldova	447,700	674,700	480,368	610,921
31	Argentina	423,343	514,000	587,000	547,846
32	Canada	380,571	351,565	390,999	382,771
33	Hungary	350,100	514,520	398,710	498,330
34	Syria	331,821	301,610	267,823	286,564
35	Azerbaijan	318,197	308,386	301,411	292,736
36	Afghanistan	318,000	321,672	270,857	250,324
37	Australia	300,518	284,897	262,966	265,150
38	Portugal	291,190	368,230	286,080	370,710
39	Greece	289,180	286,860	303,580	277,110
40	Kazakhstan	267,919	262,809	259,128	216,540
41	Austria	260,610	206,290	258,220	239,210
42	Lebanon	248,209	255,011	245,150	216,860
43	Belgium	238,600	249,740	168,030	241,860
44	Tajikistan	237,616	238,722	237,980	236,146
45	Netherlands	236,000	245,000	220,000	273,000
46	Bosnia and Herzegovina	211,101	82,591	109,071	98,265
47	Switzerland	209,029	167,911	237,232	196,223
48	North Macedonia	164,530	92,863	105,794	88,701
49	Kyrgyzstan	137,102	136,652	136,920	137,734
50	Peru	133,022	143,265	139,514	144,868
51	Czech Republic	131,350	114,960	115,590	99,500
52	Tunisia	127,000	128,000	153,000	116,000
53	Israel	104,000	101,000	104,000	104,000
54	Albania	103,645	111,247	102,167	107,713

=== 50,000–100,000 tonnes ===
Rank	Country/region	2022	2021	2020	2019
55	Armenia	87,542	87,914	84,676	81,674
56	Iraq	77,800	78,917	79,413	75,831
57	Georgia	76,700	73,700	89,000	44,300
58	Turkmenistan	64,831	64,658	66,321	63,513
59	Lithuania	51,420	36,440	51,880	32,070

=== 10,000–50,000 tonnes ===
Rank	Country/region	2022	2021	2020	2019
60	Nepal	49,989	47,865	45,205	31,386
61	Uruguay	49,840	46,987	37,039	42,322
62	Slovenia	48,840	23,010	66,120	54,270
63	Croatia	46,810	59,690	63,610	68,350
64	Bulgaria	46,400	44,030	37,870	43,620
65	El Salvador	44,407	44,727	44,696	43,798
66	Denmark	41,030	30,560	40,020	25,210
67	Yemen	34,714	32,323	22,554	21,946
68	Sweden	31,540	32,230	29,360	22,210
69	Slovakia	31,070	29,590	28,430	35,190
70	Guatemala	26,043	25,895	25,719	25,326
71	Ireland	23,200	15,860	19,470	19,880
72	Norway	17,077	18,721	12,055	15,753
73	Jordan	16,157	17,007	19,613	21,051
74	Colombia	13,357	13,081	12,228	12,441
75	Libya	10,085	22,612	16,260	8,430
76	Latvia	10,040	8,200	13,900	10,390

=== 1,000–10,000 tonnes ===
Rank	Country/region	2022	2021	2020	2019
77	Ecuador	7,210	7,192	7,164	7,274
78	Madagascar	7,165	7,156	7,146	7,162
79	Finland	7,010	7,890	7,170	8,090
80	Zimbabwe	6,825	6,820	6,816	6,863
81	Estonia	3,290	1,970	1,260	1,850
82	Malawi	3,162	3,161	3,312	2,979
83	Cyprus	2,900	3,010	2,670	1,840
84	Bolivia	2,795	2,739	2,750	2,931
85	Bhutan	2,223	2,324	4,056	4,321
86	Kenya	2,000	992	106	261
87	Saint Vincent and the Grenadines	1,645	1,516	1,500	1,482
88	Montenegro	1,535	1,517	1,402	1,487
89	Taiwan	1,400	1,458	1,041	1,178
90	Luxembourg	1,380	1,010	1,380	1,930

=== <1,000 tonnes ===
Rank	Country/region	2022	2021	2020	2019
91	Palestine	809	338	940	940
92	Paraguay	675	671	676	677
93	Grenada	473	469	465	456
94	Honduras	191	192	191	191
95	Malta	10	10	10	10

== List of countries by area harvested for apples ==
This is a list of the top ten countries by area harvested for apples in hectares (ha). The total area harvested in the world for apples was 4,825,729 hectares in 2022, up 0.02% from 4,825,629 hectares in 2021.

Rank	Country	2022	2021	2020	2019
1	China	2,128,943	2,103,488	2,082,849	2,041,197
2	India	315,000	313,000	310,000	308,000
3	Russia	232,842	222,516	210,592	207,003
4	Turkey	170,941	168,811	170,903	174,439
5	Poland	151,900	161,900	152,600	155,620
6	Uzbekistan	122,459	111,575	109,849	98,525
7	United States	116,753	116,874	119,707	119,301
8	Iran	87,644	126,024	102,988	100,759
9	Ukraine	76,900	84,400	85,000	87,700
10	Pakistan	74,061	76,044	77,429	78,296
