= List of schemes of the government of Odisha =

The Government of Odisha in India has come up with various programs called schemes (jojana) from time to time for the people of the State. This is a list of some of the major ones. State implementations of national schemes (e.g. National Nutrition Mission (Ministry of Women and Child Development); the Prohibition of Child Marriage Act, 2006; Integrated Child Development Services) are not included.

== Current schemes of Odisha government ==
| Scheme | Launched on | Department | Sector | Contributor Party | Description |
|---|---|---|---|---|---|
| ବିକଶିତ ଗାଁ ବିକଶିତ ଓଡ଼ିଶା ୨୦୩୬ Bikashita Gaon Bikashita Odisha | 5 February 2025 | Panchayati Raj and Drinking Water | Rural | - | This is an ambition of developed rural Odisha by 2036. Initially envisioned by the regional party, later the new government carried on. |
| ସୁଭଦ୍ରା ଯୋଜନା Subhadra Jojana | 17 September 2024 | Women and Child Development | Women's | BJP | This scheme for Odisha's poor women as direct quarterly cash transfers. |
| ଓଡ଼ିଶା ନିଯୁକ୍ତି ଯୋଜନା ୨୦୨୪ Odisha Employment Scheme 2024 | 1 July 2024 | Department of Employment | Employment | Bharatiya Janata Party (BJP) | Provides job training and placement assistance to unemployed. |
| କାଳିଆ (KALIA) | 21 December 2018 | Agriculture | Agriculture | Biju Janata Dal(BJD) | KALIA stand for " Krushak Assistance for Livelihood and Income Augmentation". This Sarakari Jojana has been launched by the state government of Odisha for the welfare of their farmers. |
| ଓଡ଼ିଶା ଖାଦ୍ୟ ସୁରକ୍ଷା ଯୋଜନା Odisha Food Security Scheme (OSFSS) | 2 October 2018 | Food supply and consumer welfare | Social Welfare | Biju Janata Dal | In reaction to the 2013 Food Security Act not covering certain groups in Odisha, the government is making their own version. |
| ବିଜୁ ସ୍ବାସ୍ଥ୍ଯ କଲ୍ଯାଣ ଯୋଜନା Biju Swasthya Kalyana Jojana | 15 August 2018 | Health & Family Welfare Department | Health Care | BJD | Aims at providing financial assistance for healthcare to about 3.5 crore people of the state, with annual health insurance coverage of Rs 5 lakhs per family and 7 lakhs per women members of the family. |
| Sarbakhyama Yojana | 20 June 2018 | Housing & Urban Development Dept | | BJD | Regularise unauthorised constructions in the state subject to certain conditions. Relaunched in June 2018. |
| ଉତ୍ଥାନ ଯୋଜନା Utthan Scheme | 18 June 2018 | School and Mass Education | Education | BJD | Improve education for Class VI to VIII. to provide quality education and overall development |
| ଉତ୍କର୍ଷ ଯୋଜନା Utkarsa Scheme | 18 June 2018 | School and Mass Education | Education | BJD | Improve secondary education class 9 to 10 |
| ଗୋପବନ୍ଧୁ ସାମ୍ବାଦିକ ସ୍ବାସ୍ଥ୍ଯ ବୀମା ଯୋଜନା Gopabandhu Sambadika Swasthya Bima Jojana | 1 June 2018 | Information & Public Relations Department | Health Care | BJD | Health insurance for journalists. |
| ମହାପ୍ରୟାଣ ଯୋଜନା Mahaprayana Jojana | 31 May 2018 | General Administration Department | Social Welfare | BJD | Financial assistance for cremation The Mahaprayana Jojana was implemented on 25 August 2018 and is assumed by the chief minister of Odisha to be an amendment of HSY |
| ମୁଖ୍ୟମନ୍ତ୍ରୀ କୃଷି ଉଦ୍ୟୋଗ ଯୋଜନା Mukhyamantri Krusi Udyoga Jojana | 17 May 2018 | Agriculture & Farmer Empowerment | Agriculture | BJD | Simplification of loan subsidies to farmers |
| ମୁଖ୍ୟମନ୍ତ୍ରୀ ଅଭିନବ କୃଷି ଯନ୍ତ୍ରପାତି ସନ୍ମାନ ଯୋଜନା Mukhyamantri Abhinaba Krusi Jantrapati Sanmana Jojana | May 2018 | Agriculture & Farmer Empowerment | Agriculture | BJD | Rewards innovation on farming tools and implements |
| ଭୂଚେତନା Bhoochethana | 9 April 2018 | Agriculture & Farmers Empowerment | Farmers Empowerment | BJD | Odisha's version of the Soil Health Card Scheme, soil health mapping and support for farmers |
| ଓଡ଼ିଶାର ମହିଳା କୃଷକଙ୍କ ନିମିତ୍ତ ନିଃଶୁଳ୍କ ଫୋନ୍ ଯୋଜନା Odisha Free Smartphone Jojana for Women Farmers | 9 April 2018 | Agriculture & Farmer Empowerment | Agriculture Development | BJD | Provide smartphones for women farmers to get useful agriculture information |
| ବିଜୁ ଯୁବ ସଶକ୍ତୀକରଣ ଯୋଜନା Biju Juba Sasaktikarana Jojana (BYSY) | 14 March 2018 | Sports & Youth Services | Youth Affairs | BJD | Includes Biju Yuva Vahini sub-scheme to promote youths in leadership, volunteering, sports and health. Free laptop distribution in 2019 for merit list Class XII students |
| 'Khusi' Jojana | 26 February 2018 | Health and Family Welfare | Girls' Empowerment | BJD | Sanitary napkins for adolescent girls in Classes 6 to 12 in government and government-aided schools. |
| ମୁଖ୍ୟମନ୍ତ୍ରୀ କଳାକାର ସହାୟତା ଯୋଜନା Mukhyamantri Kalakara Sahayata Jojana (MMKSY) | 17 January 2018 | Culture department | Cultural welfare | BJD | Provide financial assistance to the literature and cultural artists. |
| ଆମ କ୍ଲିନିକ୍ ଯୋଜନା AMA Clinic Jojana | 1 January 2018 | Health & Family Welfare | HealthCare | BJD | Aims at providing Fixed Day Specialist Services in Urban Clinics. Includes Obstetrics and Gynecology, Pediatrics, Medicine and Geriatrics, Eye-care, Physiotherapy and Psychiatric services. |
| ଓଡ଼ିଶା 'ସହାୟ' ଯୋଜନା Odisha Sahaya Scheme | 1 January 2018 | Health & Family Welfare | HealthCare | BJD | Free dialysis service to all patients in the public health facilities. |
| ଓଡ଼ିଶା 'ନିଦାନ' ଯୋଜନା Odisha Nidana Scheme | 1 January 2018 | Health & Family Welfare | HealthCare | BJD | Free diagnosis services in public health facilities |
| ଅମୂଲ୍ୟ ଯୋଜନା Amulya Jojana | 1 January 2018 | Health & Family Welfare | HealthCare | BJD | Aims at providing ANMOL Tablets to Auxiliary Nurse Midwives (ANMs) across the state to improve real time services to pregnant women, mothers and newborns. |
| କୃଷକମାନଙ୍କ ନିମିତ୍ତ ମୋବାଇଲ୍ Mobile for Farmers | 13 December 2017 | Agriculture and Farmers Empowerment | Farmers Empowerment | BJD | Provide smartphones for farmers. |
| ଓଡ଼ିଶା ମୀନ ପୋଖରୀ ଯୋଜନା Odisha Fish Pond Jojana | 27 November 2017 | Fisheries and Animal Resource Development Department | live stock | BJD | Create additional water bodies and subsidize fish farming |
| ମୁଖ୍ୟମନ୍ତ୍ରୀ ମେଧାବୃତ୍ତି ପୁରସ୍କାର ଯୋଜନା Mukhyamantri Medhabruti Puraskar Jojana | 14 November 2017 | School & Mass Education Department | Education | BJD | Cash prize for doing well on Class 10 board exam, merit scholarships (Odia Bhasha Brutti Puraskar) for top performers. |
| ସୁଦକ୍ଷା ଯୋଜନା Sudakhya Jojana | 10 November 2017 | Skill Development and Technical Education | Vocational | BJD | ବାଳିକାମାନଙ୍କୁ ବୈଷୟିକ ଶିକ୍ଷା ନିମିତ୍ତ ପ୍ରୋତ୍ସାହନ; Encouraging girls for technical education. Girl students who pass Class X examination are eligible to attend ITI (technical institute). Runs for 2 years. |
| ଶିଶୁ ଏବଂ ମାତୃ ମୃତ୍ୟୁହାର ପୂର୍ଣ୍ଣ ନିରାକରଣ ଅଭିଯାନ (ସମ୍ପୂର୍ଣ୍ଣା ଯୋଜନା) Sisu Abong Matru Mrutyuhara Purna Nirakarana Abhijana (SAMPURNA) scheme | September 2017 | Women & Child Development | Health Care | BJD | Financial assistance to pregnant women in try to reduce Infant Mortality Rate (IMR) and Maternal Mortality Rate (MMR) |
| ମୁଖ୍ୟମନ୍ତ୍ରୀଙ୍କ ନିଯୁକ୍ତି ସୃଷ୍ଟି ଯୋଜନା Chief Minister's Employment Generation Scheme (CEGS) | 15 August 2017 | Skill Development and Technical Education | Vocational | BJD | Upgrade skills of youth in panchayats, provide loans and subsidies |
| ତୃତୀୟ ପ୍ରକୃତି ସୁରକ୍ଷା ଅଭିଯାନ Trutiya Prakruti Surakhya Abhijana (TPSA) | August 2017 | SSEPD | Social Welfare | BJD | Provide rehabilitation facilities, scholarships, employment opportunities to transgender people. |
| ବିଜୁ ଗାଡ଼ି ଚାଳକ ବୀମା ଯୋଜନା Biju Gadi Chalaka Bima Jojana | July 2017 | Commerce & Transport | Health care | BJD | Health insurance for vehicle drivers in road accidents |
| ପରମ୍ପରା ଓ କାରୁକୃତିର ଉନ୍ନତି ତଥା ମୌଳିକ ସୁବିଧାର ବୃଦ୍ଧି Augmentation of Basic Amenities & Development of Heritage & Architecture (ଅବଢ଼ା ABADHA) | March 2017 | Culture & Tourism | Heritage & Architecture | BJD | Improve infrastructure of city of Puri |
| ବକ୍ସି ଜଗବନ୍ଧୁ ଗୃହକୁ ନିଶ୍ଚିତ ଜଳଯୋଗାଣ (ବସୁଧା) ଯୋଜନା Buxi Jagabandhu Assured Water Supply to Habitations (BASUDHA) Scheme | March 2017 (announce); 23 November 2018 (launch) | Water Resources | Water Supply | BJD | Provide potable water Initially proposed in 2017–18 budget. On 23 November 2018, the foundation stone was laid by Chief Minister Naveen Patnaik. |
| ଉନ୍ନତି (UNNATI) | March 2017 | Urban Development | Urban Infrastructure | BJD | Install LED street lights, piped water supply |
| ସ୍ବର୍ଣ୍ଣ (SWARNA) | March 2017 | Youth Affairs & Sports | Sports Development | BJD | Improve rural sports infrastructure |
| Mukhyamantri Adibandha Jojana | March 2017 | Agriculture | Water resource | BJD | Improve pond embankment |
| ମାଳତୀଦେବୀ ପ୍ରାକ୍ ବିଦ୍ୟାଳୟ ପରିଧାନ ଯୋଜନା ଓ ଗଙ୍ଗାଧର ମେହେର ଶିକ୍ଷା ମାନକବୃଦ୍ଧି ଯୋଜନା Malatidebi PrakBidayalaya Paridhana Jojana & Ganagadhar Meher Sikhya Manakbruddhi Jojana | March 2017 | School & Mass education | School Uniform & Bag | BJD | Malati Debi scheme provides preschool uniforms, and Ganagadhar Meher scheme would provide school bags. |
| ମୁଖ୍ୟମନ୍ତ୍ରୀ ସ୍ବାସ୍ଥ୍ଯ ସେବା ଅଭିଯାନ Mukhyamantri Swasthya Seba Mission | March 2017 | Health & Family Welfare | | BJD | Development of infrastructure and peripheral healthcare institutions, healthcare financial assistance to poor |
| ମୁଖ୍ୟମନ୍ତ୍ରୀ ମହିଳା ସଶକ୍ତୀକରଣ ଯୋଜନା Mukhyamantri Mahila Sasaktikarana Jojana | March 2017 | Women & Child Development | | BJD | Financial assistance for women's self-help groups |
| ମଧୁବାବୁ ଆଇନ୍ ସହାୟତା Madhubabu Aain Sahayata | 24 December 2016 | Law Department | social welfare | BJD | Legal assistance at panchayat level to people. |
| ବିଜୁ ଶିଶୁ ସୁରକ୍ଷା ଯୋଜନା Biju Shishu Surakhya Jojana | 22 December 2016 | Women & child development | Health care | BJD | Financial support for orphans and HIV-infected children for studies up to higher secondary education, also one-time token assistance for wedding |
| ବିଜୁ କନ୍ୟାରତ୍ନ ଯୋଜନା Biju Kanya Ratna Jojana | 3 September 2016 | Women & child development | Women Empowerment | BJD | To improve child sex ratio by helping girls development in education and health |
| ବରିଷ୍ଠ ବୁଣକର ସହାୟତା ଯୋଜନା Baristha Bunakara Sahayata Jojana | 7 August 2016 | Handlooms, Textiles and Handicrafts Department | | BJD | Provide pensions for elderly weavers. |
| କଳିଙ୍ଗ ଶିକ୍ଷା ସାଥି ଯୋଜନା Kalinga Sikhya Sathi Jojana (KSSY) | 27 June 2016 | Higher Education Department | Education | BJD | Low-interest loans for students. |
| ବରିଷ୍ଠ ନାଗରିକ ତୀର୍ଥଯାତ୍ରା ଯୋଜନା Baristha Nagarika Tirtha Jatra Jojana | 2016 | Tourism Department | Tourists Welfare | BJD | The scheme is envisaged to help senior citizens over 60–75 years of age to undertake pilgrimage on trains with government assistance[1] |
| ଉଜ୍ଜ୍ବଳ ଯୋଜନା Ujjwal Scheme | 7 April 2016 | School & Mass Communication Department | Education | BJD | Improve primary and secondary school education. In 2018, was relaunched to focus on Class I to V, while Utthan Scheme was implemented for Class VI to VIII. Updated in 2018 |
| ଶ୍ରମିକ ପକା ଘର ନିର୍ମାଣ ଯୋଜନା Nirman Sramika Pucca Ghar Yojana | 20 February 2016 | Panchayati Raj & Drinking Water Department | Rural Housing | BJD | Assistance to registered construction workers for construction of pucca houses |
| ଅନ୍ୱେଷା ଯୋଜନା Anwesha Scheme | 21 December 2015 | SC&ST Development & Minorities & Backward Classes welfare Department | Tribal Development | BJD | Free education to Scheduled Caste (SC) and Scheduled Tribe (ST) students as determined by lottery. |
| ଆକାଂକ୍ଷା ଯୋଜନା Akankhya Yojana | 21 December 2015 | SC&ST Development & Minorities & Backward Classes welfare Department | Tribal Development | BJD | Hostels for Scheduled Caste (SC) and Scheduled Tribe (ST) students in higher education fields |
| ଆହାର ଯୋଜନା Aahaara Jojana | 1 April 2015 | Housing and Urban Development | Food Subsidisation | | Provide cooked hot meals to poor at low cost. |
| ନିରାମୟ ଯୋଜନା Niramaya Scheme | 2015 | Health and Family Welfare | Health Care | BJD | Statewide health insurance |
| ମତ୍ସ୍ୟଜୀବୀ ବସାଗୃହ ଯୋଜନା Matsyajibi Basa Gruha Jojana | 2014 | Fisheries & Animal Resources Development Department | Housing | BJD | Provide dwellings for fishers. |
| ବିଜୁ ଗାଁ ଗାଡ଼ି ଯୋଜନା Biju Gaon Gadi Jojana | February 2014 | Commerce & Transport | Public Transportation | BJD | Provide public transportation to remote areas of Odisha. |
| ବିଜୁ କୃଷକ କଲ୍ୟାଣ ଯୋଜନା Biju Krushaka Kalyana Jojana (BKKY) | November 2013 | Agriculture | Health Insurance | BJD | Health insurance scheme for the farmers in the state of Odisha. |
| ମମତା ଯୋଜନା Mamata scheme | 5 September 2011 | Women & Child Development | Health care | BJD | Monetary support for pregnant women and lactating mothers |
| ବିଜୁ ସହରାଞ୍ଚଳ ବୈଦ୍ୟୁତୀକରଣ ଯୋଜନା Biju Saharanchala Baidyutikarana Jojana (BSVY) | September 2010 | Energy Department | Electricity | BJD | Provide access to electricity to unelectrified urban areas. |
| ଗଭୀର କୂପଖନନ ଓ ଜଳସେଚନ କାର୍ଯ୍ୟକ୍ରମ Deep Borewell Secha Karjyakrama | 2010–11 | Department of Water Resources | | BJD | Provide irrigation facilities to small and marginal farmers through installation of deep borewells covering cultivated area of minimum two hectare. |
| ବାଣୀଶ୍ରୀ ଯୋଜନା Banishree Jojana | 1 April 2008 | Women & Child Development | Education | BJD+BJP | Scholarships for children with special needs studying in schools from primary to University level including those pursuing technical and vocational education. |
| ମଧୁବାବୁ ଭତ୍ତା ଯୋଜନା Madhu Babu Pension Yojana | 2008 | Department of Social Security and Empowerment of Persons with Disabilities | Social Security | BJD+BJP | Pension for elderly, widows, and disabilities. Renewed and updated multiple times. |
| ବସୁନ୍ଧରା ଯୋଜନା Basundhara Scheme | 2008 | Revenue & Disaster Management Department | | BJD+BJP | Provide decimals of homestead land. Originally implemented in the 1970s, adjusted in 2008 and 2018. |
| Kishori Shakti Yojana କିଶୋରୀ ଶକ୍ତି ଯୋଜନା | 31 August 2007 | women & child development | Women Empowerment | BJD+BJP | Empower adolescent girls through education, social exposure, nutrition, health and development, hygiene, life skills, social skills. |
| ବିଜୁ ଗ୍ରାମ ଜ୍ୟୋତି ଯୋଜନା Biju Grama Jyoti Yojana (BGJY) | 2007 | Energy Department | Electricity | BJD+BJP | Provide access to electricity to villages and habitation less than 100 population not covered under RGGVY. |
| ମୋ ଜମି ମୋ ଡିହ Mo Jami Mo Diha | 2007 | Revenue & Disaster Management | Revenue | BJD+BJP | Protect land rights for the poor, enable them to use the land, assist poor., |
| ମହାତ୍ମା ଗାନ୍ଧୀ ବୁଣକର ବୀମା ଯୋଜନା Mahatma Gandhi Bunkar Bima Jojana (MGBBY) | 2005 | Handlooms, Textiles and Handicrafts Department | Healthcare | | Insurance coverage for accidental death and partial / total disability. Update of Bunkar Bima Yojana from 2003. |
| ମତ୍ସ୍ୟଜୀବୀ ଉନ୍ନୟନ ଯୋଜନା Matsyajibi Unnayana Yojana (MUY) | 2003 | Fisheries & Animal Resources Development Department | | BJD+BJP | Special welfare package for fishers, with 14 components including financial assistance, health/accident insurance, watercraft, cage and seaweed culture. |
| ମିଶନ୍ ଶକ୍ତି ଯୋଜନା Mission Shakti Jojana | 2001 | Women and Children Development Department | Women and MSME | BJD | Organizing millions of women in Odisha into Self-Help Groups, MSMEs, Cottage Industries with financial support from state government |
| ବିପର୍ଯ୍ୟୟ ପରିଚାଳନା Disaster Management | 2000 | Department of Revenue and Disaster Management | Natural Disasters | BJD+BJP | Setting up world-class infrastructure for management of natural disasters |

== See also ==
- List of central government schemes in India
