= Kush =

Kush or Cush may refer to:

== Places ==
- Kingdom of Kush, an ancient kingdom in Nubia
- Kush (mountain), a mountain near Kalat, Pakistan Balochistan
- Kush (Ras Al Khaimah), precursor settlement to Julfar
- Kush (satrapy), a satrapy of the Achaemenid Empire
- Hindu Kush, a mountain range in Afghanistan
- Cush (hill), a mountain in County Tipperary, Ireland

== People ==
- Cush (given name)
- Cush (surname)
- Kush (given name)
- Kush (surname)

== Arts, entertainment, and media ==
=== Music ===
- Kush (American band), American rap metal band
- Kush (Australian band), Australian jazz rock band from the 1970s
- "Kush" (song), a 2010 single by Dr. Dre
- The Kush, a 2007 album by the rapper Havoc

=== Other arts, entertainment, and media ===
- Kush (Conan), a nation in the fictional world of Conan the Barbarian
- Kush (film), 2007 independent action-thriller film
- "Kush" (Sanctuary), an episode of the science fiction series Sanctuary
- KUSH, a radio station (1600 AM) licensed to serve Cushing, Oklahoma, United States
- Kush Games, a now-defunct game development studio

== Plants ==
- Kush (cannabis), a family of potent cannabis strains named for the Hindu Kush
- Kusha grass, Desmostachya bipinnata, a perennial grass species

== Other uses ==
- Kush (maize), a cornmeal preparation similar to grits or polenta
- Kush Housing Association, a social landlord in London, England
- Kush (drug), artificial drug mixture sometimes known as kush
- Kush (red panda), a male red panda known for escaping Curraghs Wildlife Park

== See also ==
- Cushitic languages, a branch of the Afroasiatic language family spoken in north-east Africa
- Hindukush (disambiguation)
- Koosh ball, a toy ball made of rubber filaments attached to a soft rubber core
- Kusha (disambiguation)
- Kushan Empire, an empire in South Asia in the 1st century CE
- Kushi (disambiguation)
- Qush (disambiguation)
