= Kushi =

Khushi or Kushi may refer to:

== Arts and entertainment ==
- Kushi (2000 film), an Indian Tamil-language film starring Vijay and Jyothika
- Kushi (2001 film), an Indian Telugu-language film which is a remake of the 2000 film of the same name, which stars Pawan Kalyan and Bhoomika Chawla
- Khushi (2003 Hindi film), an Indian Hindi-language film remake of the 2000 film of the same name, which stars Fardeen Khan and Kareena Kapoor
- Khushi (2003 Kannada film), Indian Kannada language film starring Vijay Raghavendra and Sindhu Menon
- "Kushi" (song), 2006 song by Bombay Rockers
- Kushi (2023 film), Indian Telugu language film starring Vijay Devarakonda and Samantha Ruth Prabhu

== Places ==
- Kushi (Mountains), a mountain in Pakistan
- Kushi Armavir, a village and municipality in the Goygol Rayon of Azerbaijan
- Kushi, Iran, a city in West Azerbaijan Province, Iran
- Khushi District, a district in the East part of Logar Province, Afghanistan
- Kushi Station, a train station in Ehime Prefecture, Japan

== People ==
- Michio Kushi (1926–2014), macrobiotics educator and founder of Kushi Institute
- Andrea Kushi (1884–1959), Albanian painter
- Feroze Khushi, English cricketer
- Khushi Murali (1963–2013), Indian playback singer
- Khushi Ram (1936–2013), Indian basketball player
- Khushi Ram (gymnast), Indian gymnast
- Khushi Sharma, Indian-born Emirati cricketer
- Vojo Kushi, Albanian partisan

== Other uses ==
- Cushi, the traditional Hebrew word for a Cushite or a person of African origin
- Kushi (skewer), skewers used in Japanese cuisine to hold and pierce food for grilling and frying, such as yakitori
- Kushi language, a West Chadic language of Nigeria
- Kushi (Utamaro), an ukiyo-e print by Kitagawa Utamaro, c. 1795–96
- Khushi Scheme, a menstrual pad distribution scheme in Odisha, India

== See also ==
- Kush (disambiguation)
