= Koh e Hindu =

Mountain in Afghanistan

- (Persian: کوه هندو)
- Location within Afghanistan

Highest point
- Elevation: 2,603 m (8,540 ft)
- Parent peak: Hindu Kush
- Coordinates: 34°42′4.9″N 69°0′20.5″E

Geography
- Location: Kabul Province
- Parent range: Hindu Kush

Koh e Hindu (Persian: کوه هندو Mountain of the Hindu) is a 2,603-meter high mountain of the Hindu Kush range in Kabul Province of Afghanistan. It is located near Shakardara District and Mir Bacha Kot District, Kabul Province.

== Importance for Hindus ==
For Hindus, in ancient times, for example, in pre-Islamic times, when even the name Afghanistan was not, but then the mountains of Hindus have for residents with Hindu religious denominations in the Iranian plateau (eastern) enormous importance. The Islamization of the Iranzamin or Aryana or Ariana in the east began to eleventh century. There are still some names with the religious terminology of Hinduism that the times of Hinduism, for example, Hindu Shahi dynasties in Kah pol (Persian: کاه پل Haulm- Bridge for Kabul) or Kabulistan and Zabulistan are due. The Hindu have had their sanctities two thousands mountains. Especially in Kabul and Parwan existed several of terms that refer to Hindus and Hindu Kush in the Meaning of Hindu Happy. Here were and are also the most Hindu temples of the country.

Hinduism was one of the first religions of Asia like Zoroastrianism and Buddhism. Buddhism originated in India and it came from India to this region. Otherwise, the present territory was a stronghold of Indian, Iranian and Turkic cultures. Alone in the food and customs can be seen in this room Chinese, Turanian, Iranian and Indian ways of life. The River of Kabul and the other rivers of the Hindu Kush have been praised in Vedic and Avestan hymns, especially the eastern and southern watersheds of the Hindu Kush, the western sources of the Indus (Sindh).

== Koh, Kuh, çiya, Kash, cōṭī ==
Koh (eastern sound of Persian) or Kuh (western sound) (Persian: کوه) or serval words with sound change, mean in all Indo-Iranian languages mountain or refer to mountains. चोटी (cōṭī or Kuta) and दर्रा (Darrā) and कूतल (Kūtala), Lutke are the words of Sanskrit/Hindi/Urdu/Persian/Kurdi, Balochi/Pashto, that mean top or Summit of mountain or mountain pass or valley (dale). Kurdish çiya چيا),kash or hind-o-kash کاش) mean also mountain or mountain pass or summit of mountain. Kotal or Kutal is an abbreviation of mountain and dale (mountain pass).

Ferdoussi writes in his book, Shahnameh, books (Manucher and Kalileh wa Demneh, a part of Panjatantra ) from Kuh e Hind (Persian: کوه هند, Mountain of India)

- See Kotal e Hindukush

== See also ==
- Kush (Mountain)
- Rigvedic rivers
- Rigveda
- Vedic Sanskrit
- Indo-Aryan languages
- Avesta
- Bundahishn
- Gathas
- Zend
