= Hindukush (disambiguation) =

Hindu Kush is a mountain range in Afghanistan and Pakistan.

Hindukush or Hindu Kush may also refer to:

- Hindukush (Jowzjan) a location in Jowzjan Province, northern Afghanistan
- Hindukush, Iran, a village in Karchambu-e Shomali Rural District, Iran

== See also ==
- Hindukush Kafir people, an ethnic group native to the Nuristan region of eastern Afghanistan
- Kush (disambiguation)
- Kushi (disambiguation)
- Hindu Kush earthquake (disambiguation)
