= Band-e Hindukush =

Mountain pass in Parwan Province, Afghanistan

- Persian: بند هندوکش
- Interactive map of Band-e Hindukush
- Elevation: 4,258 metres (13,970 ft)

Third Approach
- Location: Afghanistan
- Range: Hindu Kush
- Coordinates: 35°11′02″N 68°43′30.8″E

Band-e Hindukush (Persian: بند هندوکش) is a mountain pass in Parwan Province, Afghanistan. It is located west of Parwan and southwest of Salang Pass in Jabal Saraj District. It is several kilometres from the mountain Silsilah ye Koh e Hindukush and Kotal e Hindukush, from which the Band e Hindukush pass is 205 m higher in elevation. The pass is one of the highest passes in the country. This region has a dry warm summer.
