= PEETHA =

- Company type: Government
- Industry: Social Awareness
- Founded: Bhubaneswar, Odisha, India (3 December 2018)
- Headquarters: Bhubaneswar, India
- Area served: Odisha

PEETHA or Peoples Empowerment - Enabling Transparency and Enhancing Accountability in Odisha Initiatives, is a scheme led by the government of Odisha, India. This scheme is introduced to pass information about government schemes to rural people in Odisha.

== About ==
This scheme is a sub-scheme of Ama Gaon Ama Bikas Yojana. This is part of the 3T initiative of Technology, Transparency and Team Work model of Odisha government. The aim of the scheme is to organize camps each month between the dates 15–20 at every panchayat and let the people know about the different government schemes and obtain the scheme's benefits.

In the panchayat camps other benefits will also be provided. Some of them are AMA LED (free LED distribution scheme), Mision Shakti, social security assistance like Madhu Babu Pension Yojana and the Nirman Yojana artist pension. Every month, the best panchyat in each block will be awarded with 500,000 rupees for organizing this scheme.
