= Krishi Unnati Mela =

2016 Indian political event

Krishi Unnati Mela is a three-day event launched by Prime Minister Narendra Modi on 19 March 2016 in Delhi. The fair was to create awareness among farmers about the latest agriculture-related technological developments.

During the event the Prime Minister Narendra Modi also unveiled a portal on organic farming and laid the foundation stone commencing the development of 25 Krishi Vigyan Kendras. A themed pavilion on the doubling of farmers' income; organic farming, farming co-operatives, and farm inputs, was also present to further expose local farmers to the latest developments in farming techniques at the time.

== About ==
Krishi Unnati Mela is a three-day event launched by Prime Minister Narendra Modi on 19 March 2016 in Pusa campus of Indian Agricultural Research Institute (IARI), Delhi. The event was launched to provide information on new farm schemes and technologies that will help farmers double their incomes within the next few years.

Seminars focusing on the newly launched programmes like Pradhan Mantri Krishi Sichai Yojana, Pradhan Mantri Fasal Bima Yojana, Soil Health Card Scheme and organic farming were held. The fair was conceived and initiated in 1972.
