= Youth in India =

Overview of the youths in India

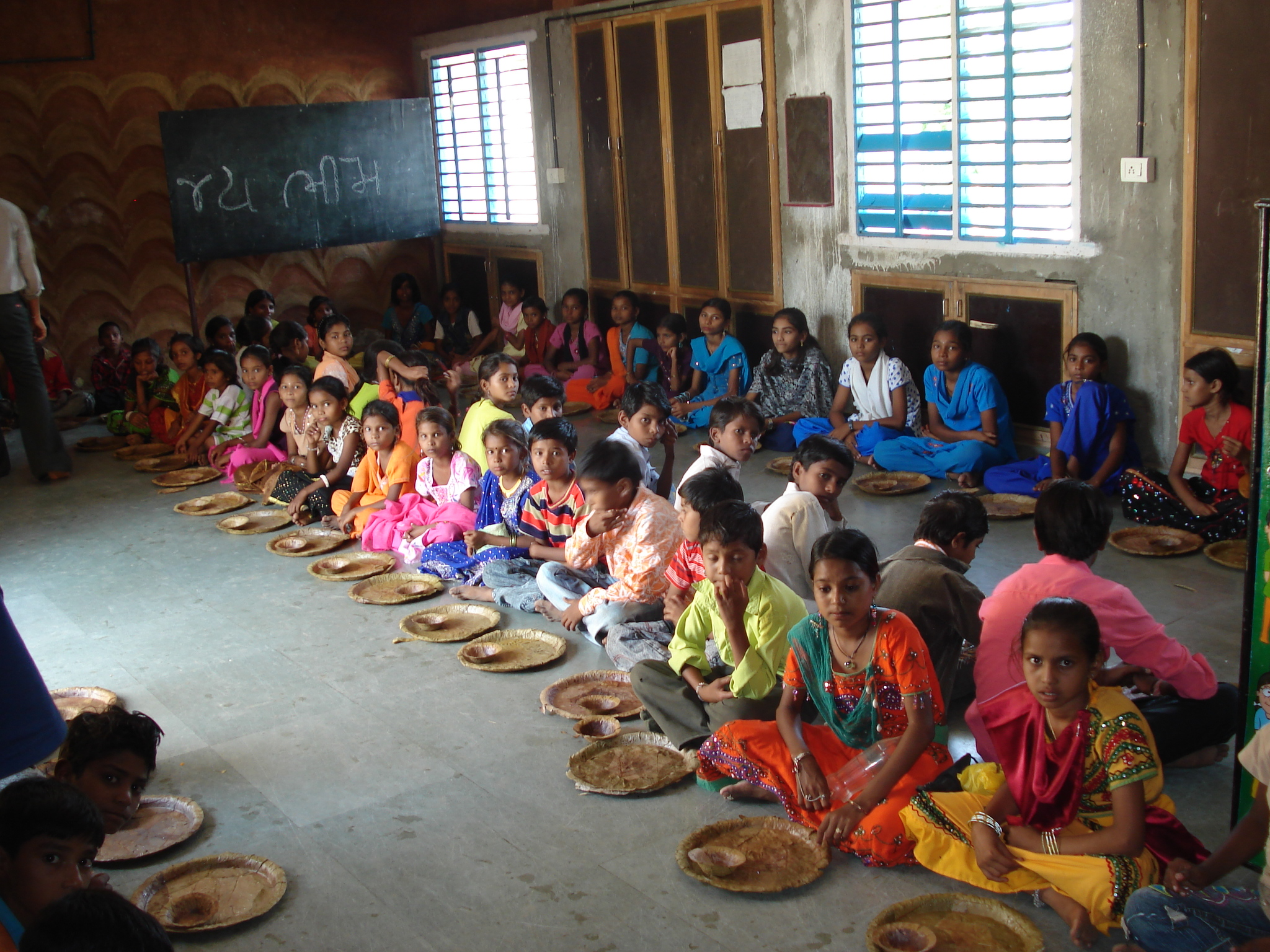
School lunch at Raika Primary School in Gujarat

India is the most populated country in the world with nearly a fifth of the world's population. According to the 2022 revision of the World Population Prospects the population stood at 1,407,563,842.

India has more than 50% of its population below the age of 25 and more than 65% below the age of 35. In 2020, the average age of an Indian is 29 years, compared to 37 for China and 48 for Japan. By 2030, India's dependency ratio will be just over 0.4. However, the number of children in India peaked more than a decade ago and is now falling. The number of children under the age of five peaked in 2007 and the number of Indians under 15 years old peaked in 2011.

There are significant issues affecting young people around education. Other persistent problems include child labour, malnutrition, street children, child marriage, and child trafficking.

== Education ==
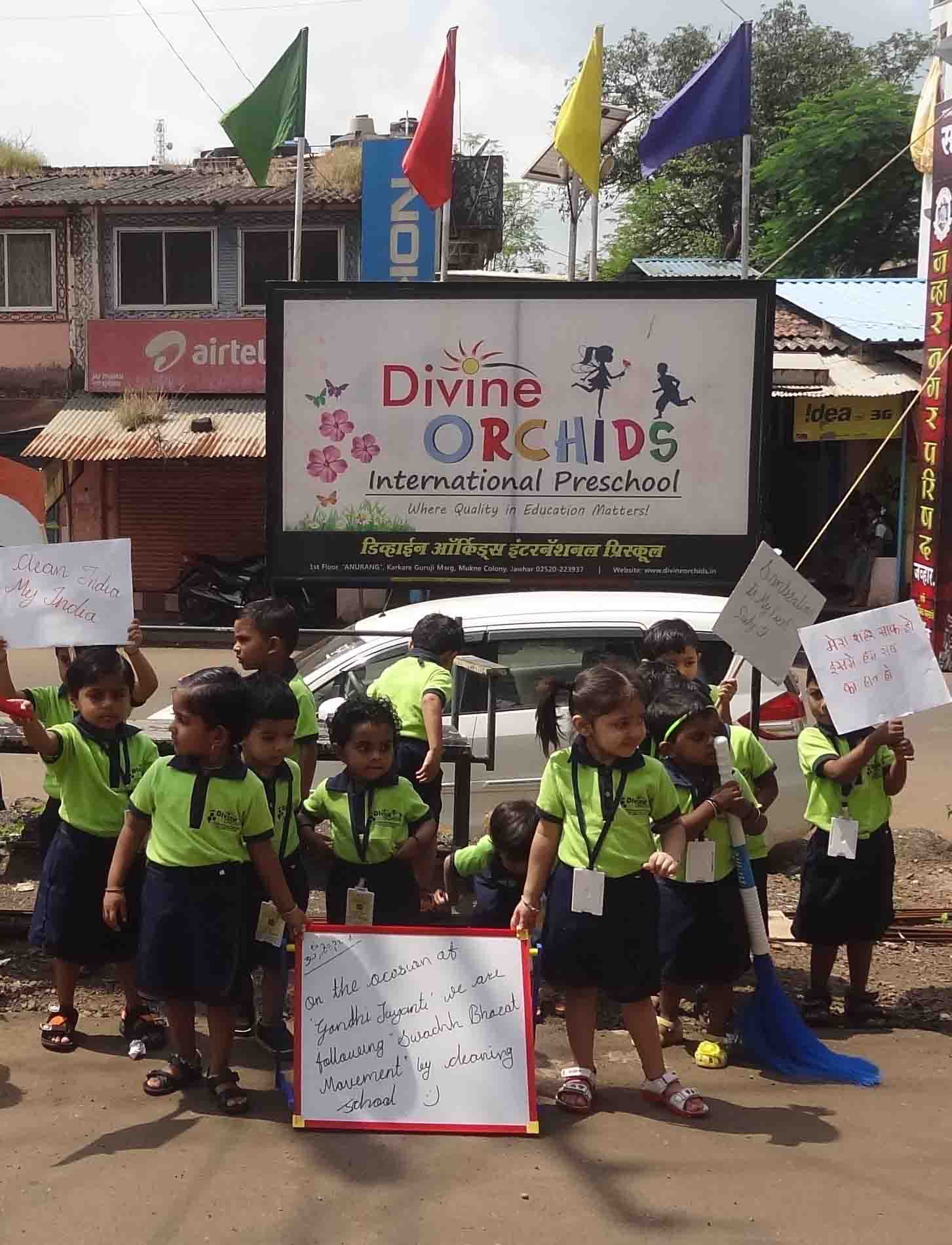
Indian Pre-Primary School children (Divine Orchids International Preschool, Jawhar)

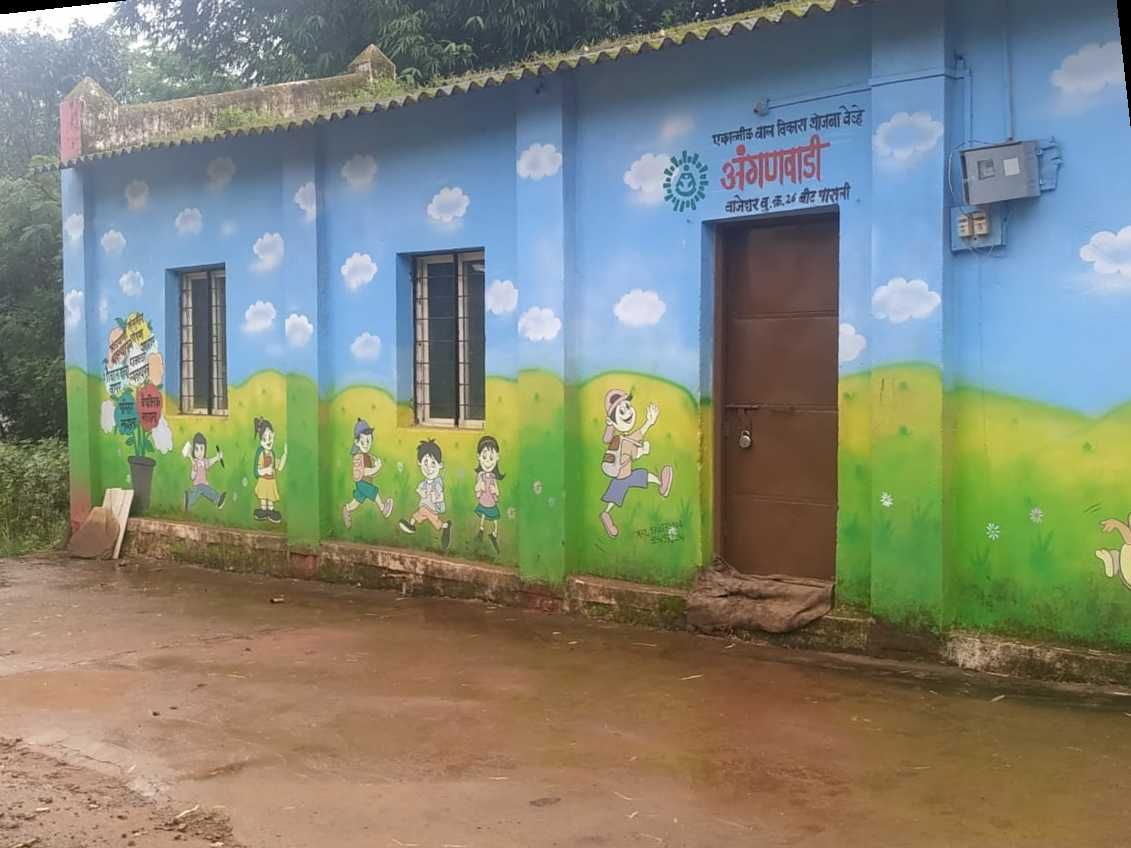
Anganwadi centre at Velhe, Pune district, 2019

As per the Annual Status of Education Report (ASER) 2012, 96.5% of all rural children between the ages of 6-14 were enrolled in school. This is the fourth annual survey to report enrollment above 96%. India has maintained an average enrolment ratio of 95% for students in this age group from year 2007 to 2014. As an outcome the number of students in the age group 6-14 who are not enrolled in school has come down to 2.8% in the year academic year 2018 (ASER 2018). Another report from 2013 stated that there were 229 million students enrolled in different accredited urban and rural schools of India, from Class I to XII, representing an increase of 23 lakh students over 2002 total enrolment, and a 19% increase in girl's enrolment. While quantitatively India is inching closer to universal education, the quality of its education has been questioned particularly in its government run school system. While more than 95 percent of children attend primary school, just 40 percent of Indian adolescents attend secondary school (Grades 9–12). Since 2000, the World Bank has committed over $2 billion to education in India. Some of the reasons for the poor quality include absence of around 25% of teachers every day. States of India have introduced tests and education assessment system to identify and improve such schools.

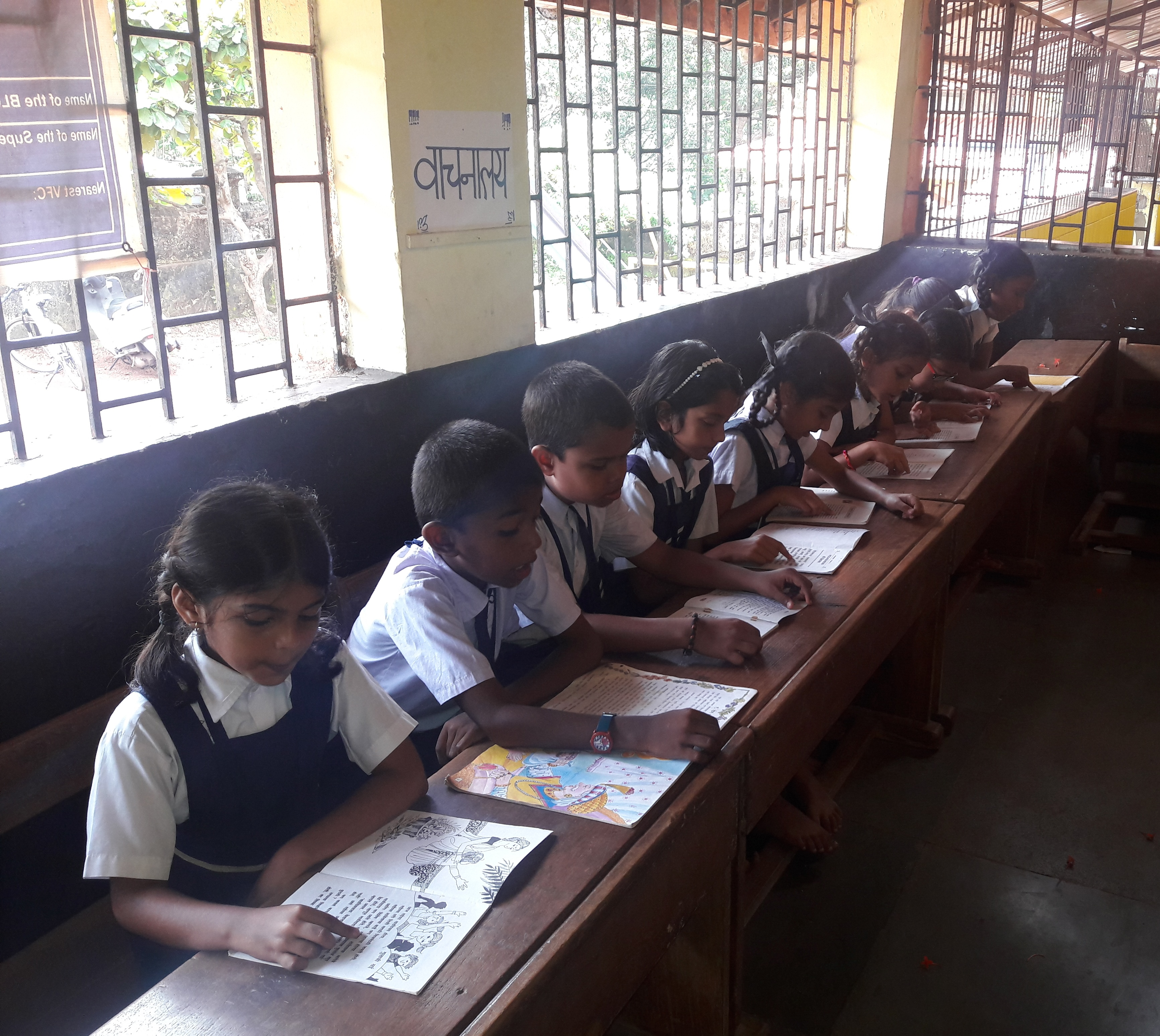
School children reading books in government primary school library, in Goa

The primary education in India is divided into two parts, namely Lower Primary (Class I-IV) and Upper Primary (Middle school, Class V-VIII). The Indian government lays emphasis on primary education ( Class I-VIII ) also referred to as elementary education, to children aged 6 to 14 years old. Because education laws are given by the states, duration of primary school visit alters between the Indian states. The Indian government has also banned child labour in order to ensure that the children do not enter unsafe working conditions. However, both free education and the ban on child labour are difficult to enforce due to economic disparity and social conditions. 80% of all recognised schools at the elementary stage are government run or supported, making it the largest provider of education in the country.

However, due to a shortage of resources and lack of political will, this system suffers from massive gaps including high pupil to teacher ratios, shortage of infrastructure and poor levels of teacher training. Figures released by the Indian government in 2011 show that there were 5,816,673 elementary school teachers in India. As of March 2012 there were 2,127,000 secondary school teachers in India. Education has also been made free for children for 6 to 14 years of age or up to class VIII under the Right of Children to Free and Compulsory Education Act 2009.

The National Sample Survey Organisation and the National Family Health Survey collected data in India on the percentage of children completing primary school which are reported to be only 36.8% and 37.7% respectively. On 21 February 2005, the Prime Minister of India said that he was pained to note that "only 47 out of 100 children enrolled in class I reach class VIII, putting the dropout rate at 52.78 percent." It is estimated that at least 35 million, and possibly as many as 60 million, children aged 6–14 years are not in school.

== Nutrition ==
The World Bank estimates that India is one of the highest ranking countries in the world for the number of children suffering from malnutrition. The prevalence of underweight children in India is among the highest in the world, and is nearly double that of Sub Saharan Africa with dire consequences for mobility, mortality, productivity and economic growth.

On the Global Hunger Index India is on place 67 among the 80 nations having the worst hunger situation which is worse than nations such as North Korea or Sudan. 25% of all hungry people worldwide live in India. Since 1990 there has been some improvements for children but the proportion of hungry in the population has increased. In India 44% of children under the age of 5 are underweight. 72% of infants and 52% of married women have anaemia. Research has conclusively shown that malnutrition during pregnancy causes the child to have increased risk of future diseases, physical retardation, and reduced cognitive abilities.

=== Socio-economic status ===
When it comes to child malnutrition, children in low-income families are more malnourished than those in high-income families. The public distribution system in India which account for distribution of wheat and rice only, by which the proteins are insufficient by these cereals which leads to malnutrition also. Some cultural beliefs that may lead to malnutrition is religion. Among these is the influence of religions, especially in India are restricted from consuming meat. Also, other Indians are strictly vegan, which means, they do not consume any sort of animal product, including dairy and eggs. This is a serious problem when inadequate protein is consumed because 56% of poor Indian household consume cereal to consume protein. It is observed that the type of protein that cereal contains does not parallel to the proteins that animal product contain (Gulati, 2012). This phenomenon is most prevalent in the rural areas of India where more malnutrition exists on an absolute level. Whether children are of the appropriate weight and height is highly dependent on the socio-economic status of the population. Children of families with lower socio-economic standing are faced with sub-optimal growth. While children in similar communities have shown to share similar levels of nutrition, child nutrition is also differential from family to family depending on the mother's characteristic, household ethnicity and place of residence. It is expected that with improvements in socio-economic welfare, child nutrition will also improve.

The rates of malnutrition are exceptionally high among adolescent girls and pregnant and lactating women in India, with repercussions for children's health. (Note: "Reports of National Health & Family Survey, United Nations International Children’s Emergency Fund, and WHO have highlighted that rates of malnutrition among adolescent girls, pregnant and lactating women, and children are alarmingly high in India. Factors responsible for malnutrition in the country include mother’s nutritional status, lactation behaviour, women’s education, and sanitation. These affect children in several ways including stunting, childhood illness, and retarded growth.")

=== Midday Meal Nutrition Scheme ===
The Midday Meal Scheme is a school meal programme of the Government of India designed to improve the nutritional status of school-age children nationwide, by supplying free lunches on working days for children in primary and upper primary classes in government, government aided, local body, Education Guarantee Scheme, and alternative innovative education centres, madrasa and maqtabs supported under Sarva Shiksha Abhiyan, and National Child Labour Project schools run by the ministry of labour. Serving 120,000,000 children in over 1,265,000 schools and Education Guarantee Scheme centres, it is the largest such programme in the world.

== Youth unemployment ==
The youth unemployment rate was around 10% in 2005, but they have not reliably reported statistics to the United Nations over the years. However, there has been an increase in young adults remaining in school and getting additional degrees simply because there are not opportunities for employment. These youth are typically of a lower class, but it can represent a wide variety of individuals across races and classes. In India, the employment system is often reliant on connections or government opportunities.

In April 2025, the overall unemployment rate was 5.1%, while the youth unemployment rate (ages 15–29) was 13.8% nationwide. Youth unemployment is higher in urban areas (about 17.2%) compared to rural areas (around 12.3%). Within this age group, young women faced higher unemployment than young men.

== Child labour ==
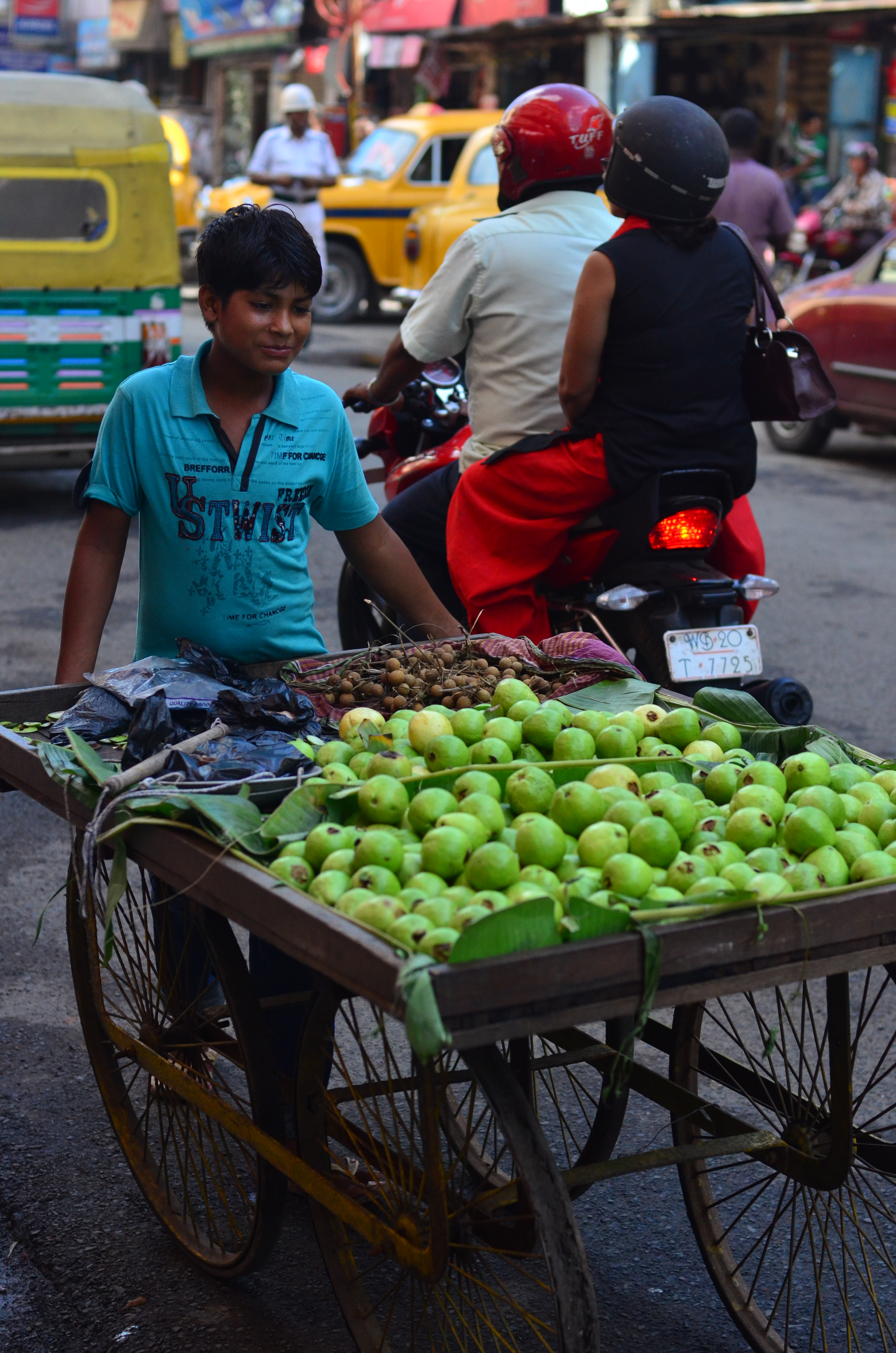
A young fruit seller in the streets of Kolkata

In 2011, the national census of India found that the total number of child labourers, aged [5–14], to be at 10.1 million, out of the total of 259.64 million children in that age group. The child labour problem is not unique to India; worldwide, about 217 million children work, many full-time.

As per the Child and Adolescent Labour (Prohibition and Regulation) Act, 1986, amended in 2016 ("CLPR Act"), a "Child" is defined as any person below the age of 14, and the CLPR Act prohibits employment of a Child in any employment including as a domestic help. It is a cognizable criminal offence to employ a Child for any work. Children between age of 14 and 18 are defined as "Adolescent" and the law allows Adolescent to be employed except in the listed hazardous occupation and processes which include mining, inflammable substance and explosives related work and any other hazardous process as per the Factories Act, 1948. In 2001, an estimated 1% of all child workers, or about 1,20,000 children in India were in a hazardous job. Notably, the Constitution of India prohibits child labour in hazardous industries (but not in non-hazardous industries) as a Fundamental Right under Article 24. UNICEF estimates that India with its larger population, has the highest number of labourers in the world under 14 years of age, while sub-Saharan African countries have the highest percentage of children who are deployed as child labourers. The International Labour Organization estimates that agriculture, at 60 percent, is the largest employer of child labour in the world, while the United Nations Food and Agriculture Organization estimates 70% of child labour is deployed in agriculture and related activities. Outside of agriculture, child labour is observed in almost all informal sectors of the Indian economy.

The presence of a large number of child labourers is regarded as a serious issue in terms of economic welfare. Children who work fail to get necessary education. They do not get the opportunity to develop physically, intellectually, emotionally and psychologically. In terms of the physical condition of children, children are not ready for long monotonous work because they become exhausted more quickly than adults. This reduces their physical conditions and makes the children more vulnerable to disease.

== Street children ==
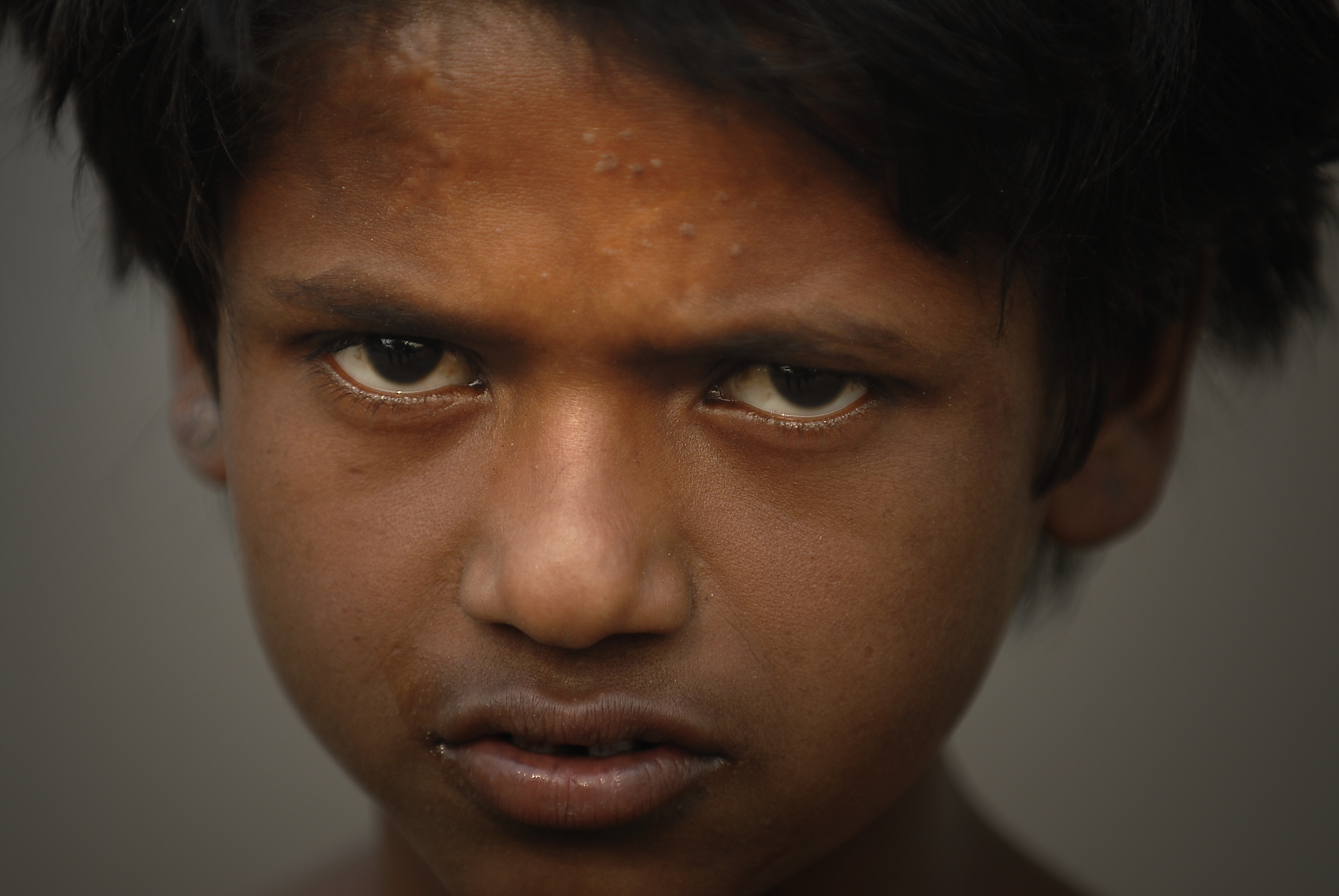
A street child in New Delhi.

India has an estimated one hundred thousand or more street children in each of the following cities: New Delhi, Kolkata, and Mumbai. Mainly because of family conflict, they come to live on the streets and take on the full responsibilities of caring for themselves, including working to provide for and protecting themselves. Though street children do sometimes band together for greater security, they are often exploited by employers and the police.

Their many vulnerabilities require specific legislation and attention from the government and other organisations to improve their condition.

== Child marriage ==
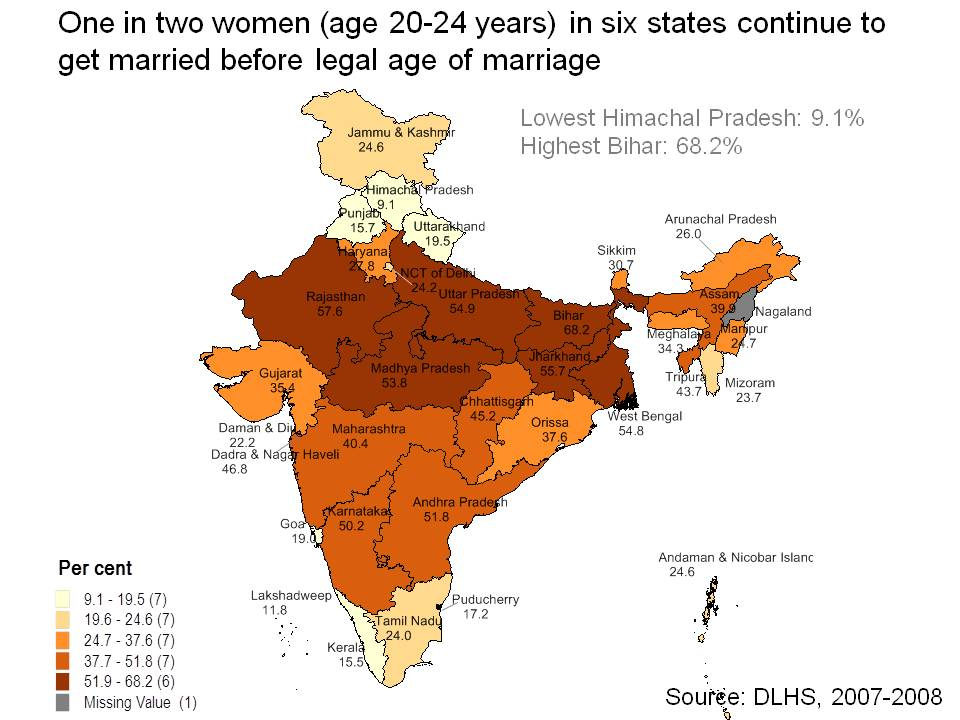
Child Marriage India by SDRC

Child marriage in India, according to the Indian law, is a marriage where either the woman is below the age of 21 or the man is below the age of 21. Most child marriages involve underage women, many of whom are in poor socio-economic conditions.

Child marriages are prevalent in India. Estimates vary widely between sources as to the extent and scale of child marriages. The International Center for Research on Women-UNICEF publications have estimated India's child marriage rate to be 47% from a sample surveys of 1998, while the United Nations reports it to be 30% in 2005. The Census of India has counted and reported married women by age, with proportion of females in child marriage falling in each 10 year census period since 1981. In its 2001 census report, India stated zero married girls below the age of 10, 1.4 million married girls out of 59.2 million girls aged 10–14, and 11.3 million married girls out of 46.3 million girls aged 15–19. Times of India reported that 'since 2001, child marriage rates in India have fallen by 46% between 2005 and 2009.Jharkhand is the state with highest child marriage rates in India (14.1%), while Kerala is the only state where child marriage rates have increased in recent years. Jammu and Kashmir was reported to be the only state with lowest child marriage cases at 0.4% in 2009. Rural rates of child marriages were three times higher than urban India rates in 2009.

Child marriage was outlawed in 1929, under Indian law. However, in the British colonial times, the legal minimum age of marriage was set at 14 for girls and 18 for boys. Under protests from Muslim organizations in the undivided British India, a personal law Shariat Act was passed in 1937 that allowed child marriages with consent from girl's guardian. After independence and adoption of Indian constitution in 1950, the child marriage act has undergone several revisions. The minimum legal age for marriage, since 1978, has been 18 for women and 21 for men. The child marriage prevention laws have been challenged in Indian courts, with some Muslim Indian organizations seeking no minimum age and that the age matter be left to their personal law. Child marriage is an active political subject as well as a subject of continuing cases under review in the highest courts of India.

Several states of India have introduced incentives to delay marriages. For example, the state of Haryana introduced the so-called Apni Beti, Apna Dhan program in 1994, which translates to "My daughter, My wealth". It is a conditional cash transfer program dedicated to delaying young marriages by providing a government paid bond in her name, payable to her parents, in the amount of ₹25,000 (US$260), after her 18th birthday if she is not married.

Child marriage has been traditionally prevalent in India but is not so continued in Modern India to this day. Historically, child brides would live with their parents until they reached puberty. In the past, child widows were condemned to a life of great agony, shaved heads, living in isolation, and being shunned by society. Although child marriage was outlawed in 1860, it is still a common practice. The Child Marriage Restraint Act, 1929 is the relevant legislation in the country.

According to UNICEF's "State of the World’s Children-2009" report, 47% of India's women aged 20–24 were married before the legal age of 18, rising to 56% in rural areas. The report also showed that 40% of the world's child marriages occur in India.

== Sexuality ==
In India there is growing evidence that adolescents are becoming more sexually active. It is feared that this will lead to an increase in spread of HIV/AIDS among adolescents, increase the number of unwanted pregnancies and abortions, and give rise to conflict between contemporary social values. Adolescents have relatively poor access to health care and education. With cultural norms opposing extramarital sexual behavior, R.S. Goyal fears "these implications may acquire threatening dimensions for the society and the nation".

Motivation and frequency

Sexual relationships outside marriage are not uncommon among teenage boys and girls in India. In a random study of 100 couples, the best predictor of whether or not a girl would be having sex is if her friends were engaging in the same activities. For those girls whose friends were having a physical relationship with a boy, 84.4% were engaging in the same behavior. Only 24.8% of girls whose friends were not having a physical relationship had one themselves. In urban areas, 25.2% of girls have had intercourse and in rural areas 20.9% have. Better indicators of whether or not girls were having sex were their employment and school status. Girls who were not attending school were 14.2% (17.4% v. 31.6%) more likely to be having sex; for girls who were employed this number was 14.4% (36.0% v. 21.6%).

In the Indian sociocultural milieu girls have less access to parental love, schools, opportunities for self-development and freedom of movement than boys do. It has been argued that they may rebel against this lack of access or seek out affection through physical relationships with boys. While the data reflects trends to support this theory, it is inconclusive. The freedom to communicate with adolescent boys was restricted for girls regardless of whether they lived in an urban or rural setting, and regardless of whether they went to school or not. More urban girls than rural girls discussed sex with their friends. Those who did not may have felt "the subject of sexuality in itself is considered an 'adult issue' and a taboo or it may be that some respondents were wary of revealing such personal information."

Contraceptive use

Among Indian girls, Goyal claims that "misconceptions about sex, sexuality and sexual health were large. However, adolescents having sex relationships were somewhat better informed about the sources of spread of STDs and HIV/AIDS." While 40% of sexually active girls were aware that condoms could help prevent the spread of HIV/AIDS and reduce the likelihood of pregnancy, only 10.5% used a condom during the last time they had intercourse.

== Sexual abuse ==
=== Laws ===
Child sexual abuse laws in India have been enacted as part of the child protection policies of India. The Parliament of India passed the 'Protection of Children Against Sexual Offences Bill, 2011' regarding child sexual abuse on 22 May 2012 into an Act. The rules formulated by the government in accordance with the law have also been notified on the November 2012 and the law has become ready for implementation. There have been many calls for more stringent laws.

== Child trafficking ==
India has one of the largest population of children in the world - Census data from 2011 shows that India has a population of 472 million children below the age of eighteen. Protection of children by the state is guaranteed to Indian citizens by an expansive reading of Article 21 of the Indian constitution, and also mandated given India's status as signatory to the UN Convention on the Rights of the Child.

India has a very high volume of child trafficking. As many as one child disappears every eight minutes, according to the National Crime Records Bureau. In some cases, children are taken from their homes to be bought and sold in the market. In other cases, children are tricked into the hands of traffickers by being presented an opportunity for a job, when in reality, upon arrival they become enslaved. In India, there are many children trafficked for various reasons such as labor, begging, and sexual exploitation. Because of the nature of this crime; it is hard to track; and due to the poor enforcement of laws, it is difficult to prevent. Due to the nature of this crime, it is only possible to have estimates of figures regarding the issue. India is a prime area for child trafficking to occur, as many of those trafficked are from, travel through or destined to go to India. Though most of the trafficking occurs within the country, there is also a significant number of children trafficked from Nepal and Bangladesh. There are many different causes that lead to child trafficking, with the primary reasons being poverty, weak law enforcement, and a lack of good quality public education. The traffickers that take advantage of children can be from another area in India, or could even know the child personally. Children who return home after being trafficked often face shame in their communities, rather than being welcomed home.

== See also ==
- Childline India
- Children's Day (India)
- Children's Film Society, India
- Ministry of Women and Child Development
- Odisha State Child Protection Society
- Save the Children India
- Youth in Indian politics
