= Kush (surname) =

Kush is the surname of the following notable people:

- Emil Kush (1916–1969), American baseball player
- Eric Kush (born 1989), American football player
- Frank Kush (1929–2017), American football coach
- Joseph C. Kush, American school psychologist
- Kundan Singh Kush (1881–1967), Arya Samaj missionary
- Rod Kush (born 1956), American football player
- Vladimir Kush (born 1965), Russian painter

== See also ==
- Cush (surname)
