= Subhadra Yojana =

Women-centric welfare scheme in Odisha, India

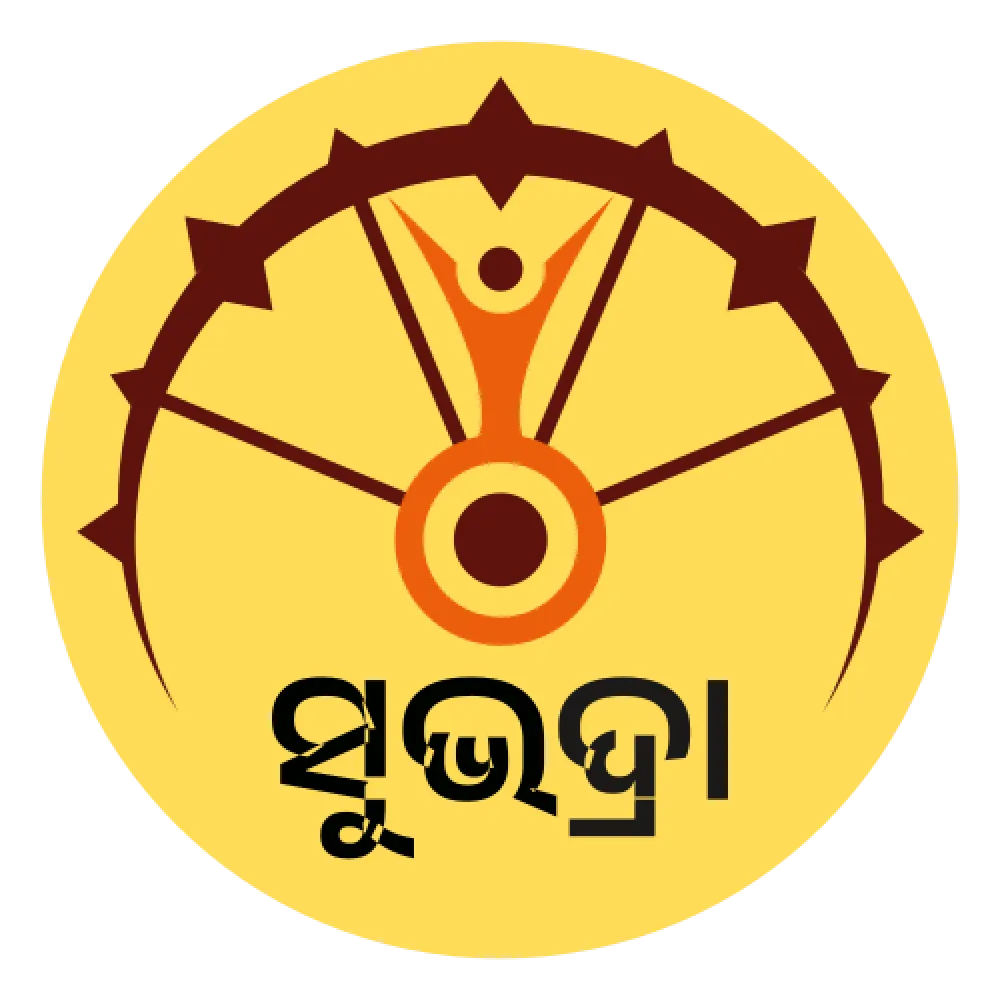
- Launched by Prime Minister Narendra Modi on September 17, 2024, in Odisha
- Country: India
- Ministry: Ministry of Women and Child Development
- Key people: Narendra Modi (Prime Minister), Mohan Charan Majhi (Chief Minister of Odisha)
- Launched: September 17, 2024; Odisha
- Budget: ₹55,825 crore (2024–2029)
- Status: On going
- Website: subhadra.odisha.gov.in

Subhadra Yojana (introduced 17 September 2024) is a women-centric welfare scheme launched by the Government of Odisha aiming on empowering women aged 21 to 60 years by providing direct financial assistance. The initiative, inaugurated by Prime Minister Narendra Modi, intends to benefit over 1 crore women across the state of Odisha.

== Objective ==
The main objective of the Subhadra Yojana is to provide financial assistance to women from economically weaker sections, thereby promoting economic empowerment. Women eligible under the scheme will receive ₹50,000 over a five-year period, starting from the fiscal year 2024–25. The funds are transferred directly into Aadhaar-linked bank accounts through two annual instalments of ₹5,000, disbursed on Raksha Bandhan and International Women's Day.

== Key features ==
- Eligibility: Women aged between 21 and 60 years who belong to economically weaker sections. Government employees, income-tax payers, and women receiving more than ₹1,500 per month under other government schemes are ineligible.
- Installments: Each eligible woman will receive ₹10,000 annually in two instalments of ₹5,000.
- Duration: The scheme is planned for five years (2024–2029).
- Registration: The registration for the scheme began on September 1, 2024, with over 50 lakh women already registered as beneficiaries. There is no deadline for registration, ensuring maximum participation.
- Incentives: The top 100 beneficiaries in each gram panchayat and urban area with the highest digital transactions will receive an additional ₹500.
- Debit Card: Beneficiaries are provided with a "Subhadra Debit Card" to facilitate seamless transactions.

== Implementation ==
The government aims to leverage the JAM trinity (Jan Dhan-Aadhaar-Mobile) to ensure efficient delivery of the funds. Beneficiaries must complete e-KYC to qualify for the scheme. As of September 17, 2024, ₹1,250 crore was transferred to over 25 lakh registered women.

== Political and economic impact ==
Subhadra Yojana was a key promise in the BJP's 2024 election manifesto in Odisha. The scheme, named after Devi Subhadra, sister of Lord Jagannath, holds cultural significance in the state. It also serves as a direct counter to the BJD's Mission Shakti program.

Economists suggest that the scheme, with a budget of ₹55,825 crore, will generate a multiplier effect, potentially contributing ₹2.5 lakh crore to Odisha's economy over the next five years.

== Subhadra Yojana – Key Statistics (2024–2026) ==
=== Budget & Financial Allocation ===
Indicator	Value	Period
Total Outlay	₹55,825 crore	2024–29 (5-year period)
Budget Allocation	₹8,570 crore	2024–25 (Revised Estimate)
Budget Allocation	₹10,145.20 crore	2025–26 (Budget Estimate)
Budget Growth (YoY)	+18.85%	2024–25 to 2025–26

=== Beneficiary & Disbursement Data ===
Phase / Indicator	Beneficiaries	Amount Disbursed
Phase I	25 lakh women	₹1,250 crore
Phase II	39 lakh women	₹1,950 crore
Phase III	20 lakh women	₹1,000 crore
Phase IV	18 lakh women	₹900 crore
Phase V	2.3 lakh women	₹115+ crore
Second Installment (8 March 2025)	~1 crore women	₹5,000 crore

=== Application & Coverage Data ===
Indicator	Value
Total Applications (by Nov 2024)	1.06 crore
District Coverage	30 districts (Odisha)
Verification-based Exclusions	~2 lakh applicants
Helpline Operational Hours	6 AM – 10 PM

=== Eligibility Parameters ===
Parameter	Requirement
Age Range	21–60 years
Income Ceiling	₹2.5 lakh annual family income
Transfer Mode	Aadhaar-linked Direct Bank Transfer
Exclusion Criteria	Govt benefit ≥ ₹1,500/month; income tax payers; four-wheeler owners
Digital Incentive Bonus	₹500 (top-performing beneficiaries)

== See also ==
- Direct Benefit Transfer
- Bharatiya Janata Party
- List of schemes of the government of Odisha
