= Gopabandhu Jan Arogya Yojana =

Universal health care program in Odisha, India

- State: Odisha
- Ministry: Health & Family welfare department
- Key people: Naveen Patnaik(original launcher); Mohan Majhi(renaming)
- Launched: 15 Feb 2017 (BSKY)
- Website: gjay.odisha.gov.in

Biju Swasthya Kalyana Jojana is a universal health coverage scheme launched by the former Chief Minister of Odisha, Naveen Patnaik as BSKJ in 2017. It is more effective than Ayushman Jojana. Hence, when Ayushman was launched one year later in 2018 it was not implemented in Odisha.

BJP state unit of Odisha had a political motive and didn't understand the benefits of BSKJ. It blindly put allegations against BSKJ misleading the state and the media. After BJD lost the 2024 assembly elections of Odisha the BJP govt renamed BSKJ as Gopabandhu Jana Arogya Jojana (ଗୋପବନ୍ଧୁ ଜନ ଆରୋଗ୍ୟ ଯୋଜନା) abbreviated as GJAJ then launched the Ayushman Yojana and made GJAJ a subservient of Ayushman, destroying regional uniqueness of Odisha govt. But the beneficiaries faced a volley of problems after ban on BSKJ.Most of the hospitals where BSKJ could be used, are now not accepting it and the Ayushman card is also accepted with so many criteria and restrictions.

In 2017-2024 period BSKJ program extended coverage to approximately 70 lakh families, with the state government allocating a budget of 250 crore rupees. Services:

- Free health services are available in all state government health care facilities, starting from the subcenter level up to the district headquarter hospital level, with Swasthya Mitras deployed at help desk.
- Annual health coverage of Rs 5 lakhs per family and 7 lakhs per female members of the family.

A health card that contains details about members of the household is provided to families with a Biju Krushak Kalyan Yojana (BKKY) card. The Rashtriya Swathya Bima Yojana card is available to families with an annual income of $50,000 in rural environments and 60,000 in urban environments.

==Program==

Biju Swastya Kalyan Yojana is for both Below Poverty Line (BPL) and Above Poverty Line( APL) families. The Ayushman Bharat Yojana covers only Below Poverty Line (BPL) card holders. People will get treatment in premier hospitals outside Odisha. A legal citizen of Odisha living outside the state would also get benefits. More than 1.1 crore patients have benefited from this scheme. The annual income should be 3 lakhs for the treatment of cancer, heart, and kidney diseases. All premier hospitals, including Tata Memorial, CMC Vellore, and Narayana Hrudalaya, are covered by this scheme. A patient referred to a hospital outside Odisha would get conveyance of Rs 2000.

== Coverage and phases ==
First Phase — The inaugural phase of the Biju Swasthya Kalyan Yojana (BSKY) was dedicated to ensuring universal access to healthcare services in public health facilities across Odisha. Regardless of income or residential status, all individuals were entitled to free-of-cost healthcare services. This phase provided health assurance coverage to 70 lakh families, encompassing over 70% of the state's population. Families were guaranteed coverage of up to ₹5 lakh annually, with an increased amount of ₹7 lakh for families with female members.

Second Phase — Building upon the success of its initial phase, BSKY extended its coverage to include cashless healthcare services in private health facilities for all ration card holders. The government launched Smart Health Cards under the Biju Swasthya Kalyan Yojana, covering 3.5 crore people out of the state's 4.3 crore population. These cards, introduced on August 20, 2021, function akin to debit cards, facilitating hassle-free access to quality healthcare services at premier facilities. Notably, Odisha becomes the first state in India to implement such a system, aiming to benefit 96 lakh families in a phased manner. Smart Health Cards provide financial coverage of up to Rs 5 lakh per annum for families, with women members eligible for enhanced coverage up to Rs 10 lakh annually.

Third Phase — The third phase of BSKY marked a significant milestone in Odisha's healthcare initiatives. This phase expanded coverage to include all rural families in the state, with the exception of income tax payees and government employees who were previously excluded from the scheme. The primary objective of this phase was to provide cashless care in private hospitals for critical ailments, thereby eliminating the financial barriers to accessing high-quality healthcare services. By extending coverage to previously underserved populations, BSKY aimed to safeguard families from the burden of exorbitant healthcare expenses, ensuring that no family in Odisha would be left vulnerable due to financial constraints.

== See also ==
- Rashtriya Swasthya Bima Yojana
- Pradhan Mantri Suraksha Bima Yojana
- Odisha Government Schemes List
