= Ministry of Women and Child Development =

Government ministry of India

- Branch of Government of India

- Ministry of Women and Child Development

Agency overview
- Formed: 2006
- Jurisdiction: Government of India
- Headquarters: Ministry of Women and Child Development Shastri Bhawan, Dr. Rajendra Prasad Road New Delhi
- Annual budget: ₹28,183.06 crore (US$2.9 billion) (2026-27 est.)
- Ministers responsible: Annapurna Devi, Cabinet Minister; Savitri Thakur, Minister of State
- Website: wcd.gov.in

The Ministry of Women and Child Development, a branch of the Government of India, is the apex body responsible for the formulation and administration of the rules, regulations, and laws relating to women and child development in India. The incumbent minister for the Ministry of Women and Child Development is Annpurna Devi, who has held the portfolio since 2024.

== History ==
The Department of Women and Child Development was set up in 1985 as a part of the Ministry of Human Resource Development to provide much-needed impetus to the holistic development of women and children. With effect from 30 January 2006, the department was upgraded to a Ministry.

== Mandate ==
The Ministry's broad mandate is to promote the holistic development of women and children. As the central authority for advancing the welfare of women and children, the Ministry formulates plans, policies, and programs; enacts or amends legislation; and coordinates efforts between governmental and non-governmental organisations working in this field. In addition to its coordinating role, the Ministry implements innovative programs aimed at women and children. These programs focus on welfare, support services, employment training, income generation, awareness building, and gender sensitisation. They complement and supplement other general development initiatives in sectors like health, education, and rural development. Ultimately, these efforts are designed to empower women both economically and socially, ensuring they become equal partners in national development alongside men.

== Policy initiatives ==
To promote the holistic development of children, the Ministry has been implementing the world’s largest outreach program, the Integrated Child Development Services (ICDS). This program provides a range of services, including supplementary nutrition, immunisation, health check-ups, referral services, and pre-school non-formal education. The Ministry ensures effective coordination and monitoring of various sectoral programs, many of which are run in collaboration with non-governmental organisations (NGOs). Efforts are continually made to increase the involvement of NGOs. Recent key policy initiatives by the Ministry include the universalisation of ICDS, the launch of the Kishori Shakti Yojana (a nutrition program for adolescent girls), the establishment of the Commission for Protection of Child Rights, and the enactment of the Protection of Women from Domestic Violence Act.

The ministry also gives the annual Stree Shakti Puraskar in six categories, namely Devi Ahilya Bai Holkar, Kannagi Award, Mata Jijabai Award, Rani Gaidinliu Zeliang Award, Rani Lakshmi Bai Award and Rani Rudramma Devi (for both men & women).

== Organisation ==
The Ministry of Women and Child Development is headed by Annpurna Devi, the Minister, while Indevar Pandey serves as the secretary. The ministry’s activities are carried out through seven bureaux, and it oversees six autonomous organisations operating under its authority, four of which are the following:

- National Institute of Public Cooperation and Child Development (NIPCCD)
- National Commission for Women (NCW)
- National Commission for Protection of Child Rights (NCPCR)
- Central Adoption Resource Authority (CARA)
- Central Social Welfare Board (CSWB)
- Rashtriya Mahila Kosh (RMK)
- State Resource Centre for Women, Nagaland

== Schemes and Programmes ==
- Child Adoption Resource Information & Guidance System
- Child Marriage Free Bharat
- Internship Programme (Ministry of Women and Child Development)
- Mission Shakti
- Mission Vatsalya
- Nutrition Resource Platform, Child Development and Nutrition Bureau
- Pradhan Mantri Matru Vandana Yojana
- Prime Ministers Overarching Scheme for Holistic Nourishment (POSHAN)
- SHe Box-Online Complaint Management System for Sexual Harassment at Workplace
- Sakhi Dashboard
- e-Incremental Learning Approach (e-ILA)

== Subjects allocated to the ministry ==
- Integrated Child Protection Scheme
- Welfare of the family.
- References from the United Nations National Nutrition Policy, national Plan of Action for Nutrition and National Nutrition Mission.
- Charitable and religious endowments pertaining to subjects allocated to this Department
- Promotion and development of voluntary effort on the subjects allocated to this Department
- Implementation of -
  - Immoral Traffic in Women and Girl Act. 1956 (as amended up to 1986) .
  - The Indecent Representation of Women (Prevention) Act, 1986 (60 of 1986).
  - The Dowry Prohibition Act. 1961 (28 of 1961)
  - The Commission of Sati (Prevention) Act, 1987 (3 of 1988), excluding the administration of criminal justice in regard to offences under these Acts.
- Implementation of the Infant Milk Substitutes, Feeding Bottles and Infant Food (Regulation of Production, Supply and Distribution) Act, 1992 (41 of 1992).
- Coordination of activities of Cooperative for Assistance and Relief Everywhere (CARE)
- Planning, Research, Evaluation, Monitoring, Project Formulations, Statistics and Training relating to the welfare and development of women and children, including development of gender sensitive data base.
- United Nations Children's Fund (UNICEF)
- Central Social Welfare Board (CSWB)
- National Institute of Public Cooperation and Child Development (NIPCCD)
- Women’s Empowerment and Gender Equality.
  - National Commission for Women
  - The Juvenile Justice (Care and Protection of Children) Act, 2015.
  - Probation of Juvenile offenders.
  - Issues relating to adoption, Central Adoption Resource Agency and Child Help Line (Childline).
  - The Children Act, 1960 (60 of 1960).
  - The Child Marriage – Restraint Act, 1929 (19 of 1929).

== Cabinet Ministers ==
- Note: I/C – Independent Charge

Portrait	Minister (Birth-Death) Constituency	Term of office			Political party	Ministry	Prime Minister
Portrait	Minister (Birth-Death) Constituency	From	To	Period	Political party	Ministry	Prime Minister
	Renuka Chowdhury (born 1954); MP for Khammam (Minister of State, I/C)	30 January 2006	22 May 2009	3 years, 113 days	Indian National Congress	Manmohan I	Manmohan Singh
	Krishna Tirath (born 1955); MP for North West Delhi (Minister of State, I/C)	28 May 2009	26 May 2014	4 years, 363 days	Indian National Congress	Manmohan II	Manmohan Singh
	Maneka Gandhi (born 1956); MP for Pilibhit	27 May 2014	30 May 2019	5 years, 4 days	Bharatiya Janata Party	Modi I	Narendra Modi
	Smriti Irani (born 1976); MP for Amethi	31 May 2019	9 June 2024	5 years, 9 days	Bharatiya Janata Party	Modi II	Narendra Modi
	Annpurna Devi (born 1970); MP for Kodarma	10 June 2024	Incumbent	2 years, 142 days	Bharatiya Janata Party	Modi III	Narendra Modi

== Ministers of State ==
Portrait	Minister (Birth-Death) Constituency	Term of office			Political party	Ministry	Prime Minister
Portrait	Minister (Birth-Death) Constituency	From	To	Period	Political party	Ministry	Prime Minister
	Krishna Raj (born 1967); MP for Shahjahanpur	5 July 2016	3 September 2016	60 days	Bharatiya Janata Party	Modi I	Narendra Modi
	Virendra Kumar Khatik (born 1954); MP for Tikamgarh	3 September 2017	30 May 2019	1 year, 269 days	Bharatiya Janata Party	Modi I	Narendra Modi
	Debasree Chaudhuri (born 1971); MP for Raiganj	31 May 2019	7 July 2021	2 years, 37 days	Bharatiya Janata Party	Modi II	Narendra Modi
	Mahendra Munjapara (born 1968); MP for Surendranagar	7 July 2021	9 June 2024	2 years, 338 days	Bharatiya Janata Party	Modi II	Narendra Modi
	Savitri Thakur (born 1978); MP for Dhar	10 June 2024	Incumbent	2 years, 142 days	Bharatiya Janata Party	Modi III	Narendra Modi

== See also ==
- Integrated Child Protection Scheme
- Odisha State Child Protection Society
- The Indira Gandhi Matritva Sahyog Yojana (IGMSY)
- Indian Women And Child Welfare Trust
