= Integrated Child Protection Scheme =

Indian government scheme

The Integrated Child Protection Scheme (ICPS) is a governmental program implemented by the Government Of India to help secure the safety of children, with a special emphasis on children in need of care and protection, juveniles in conflict or contact with the law and other vulnerable children. Its primary purpose is to create a central structure to provide oversight and standardization for pre-existing and evolving child protection schemes in India. Proposed in 2006 and implemented in 2009, the ICPS is administered at the state level by state child protection committees and societies and at the district level by district child protection societies, among other institutions.

== Structures ==
Government of India Level

- Ministry of Women and Child Development (India)
- Central Adoption Resource Authority
- Central Project Support Unit
- National Institute of Public Cooperation and Child Development
- childline 1098 services

State Government Level

- State Child Protection Society
- State Adoption & Resource Agency
- State Project Support Unit
- State Adoption Recommendation Committee

District Level

- District Child Protection Unit
- Child Welfare Committee
- Juvenile Justice Board
- Special Juvenile Police Unit
- Sponsorship Foster Care Approval Committee
- District Inspection Committee

Sub-District Level

- Block Level Child Protection Committee
- Village Level Child Protection Committee

== See also ==
- Odisha State Child Protection Society
