= CM Kishan Yojana =

Farmer welfare scheme in Odisha

CM Kisan Yojana
- ସିଏମ୍ କିସାନ ଯୋଜନା
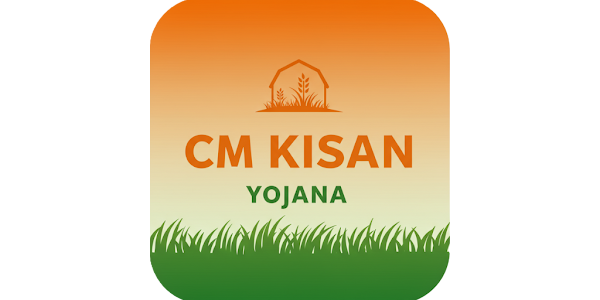
- Country: India
- State: Odisha
- Ministry: Department of Agriculture and Farmers Welfare
- Key people: Narendra Modi (Prime minister); Mohan Charan Majhi (Chief minister)
- Launched: 2024
- Website: cmkisan.odisha.gov.in
- Status: Active

Odisha Chief Minister Kisan Yojana (formerly KALIA Yojana; famously CM Kisan Yojana) is a farmer welfare scheme implemented in the Indian state of Odisha. The scheme was introduced by the Government of Odisha after the Bharatiya Janata Party (BJP) formed the government in the state in 2024. It replaced the earlier KALIA Yojana, which had been launched by the previous Biju Janata Dal (BJD) government in 2018.

== See also ==
- KALIA Yojana
- Pradhan Mantri Kisan Samman Nidhi
- Agriculture in Odisha
- Mohan Charan Majhi
