= Hindu Kush earthquake =

Hindu Kush earthquake may refer to these earthquakes in the Hindu Kush mountains:

- 1983 Hindu Kush earthquake
- 1991 Hindu Kush earthquake
- 2002 Hindu Kush earthquakes
- 2005 Hindu Kush earthquake
- December 2015 Hindu Kush earthquake
- October 2015 Hindu Kush earthquake

== See also ==
- Hindukush (disambiguation)
