= Kush (mountain) =

Mountain in Pakistan

- Location within Pakistan

Highest point
- Elevation: 2,527 m (8,291 ft)
- Coordinates: 28°49′1.7″N 66°34′2.7″E

Geography
- Location: Balochistan, Pakistan
- Parent range: Toba Kakar Range

Kush (Balochi: کش, kill) is a mountain near Kalat, Pakistan. It is located not far from the similarly named Kushi mountain.
