= Joseph C. Kush =

American psychologist

- Born: Joseph C. Kush; Topeka, Kansas, U.S.
- Education: Washburn University (BS); Pittsburg State University (MS); Arizona State University (PhD)
- Known for: Research examining test bias and test fairness in intellectual assessment
- Partner(s): Inna Vaisleib, M.D.
- Children: 2
- Scientific career
- Fields: School psychology
- Institutions: Duquesne University
- Thesis: Fild-Dependence, Cognitive Ability, and Academic Achievement in Anglo American and Mexican American Students
- Doctoral advisor: Edward N. Argulewicz

Joseph C. Kush is an American school psychologist and Professor at Duquesne University, in Pittsburgh, Pennsylvania. He was born in Topeka Kansas and attended Hayden High School and Washburn University where he received a B.S. in Psychology, and Pittsburg State University where he received his M.S., also in psychology. He subsequently attended Arizona State University, where he received his Ph.D. in school psychology. He is also a past-president of the Arizona Association of School Psychologists. He was a 2018-19 Fulbright Scholar who taught and conducted research at Sumy State University in Ukraine. His research interests include the assessment of intelligence in children, computational thinking, and instructional technology. His most recent research examines bias in psychological assessment using artificial intelligence.

== Selected publications ==
- Kush, J. C. (in press). Elemental cognitive tasks: Supplements or alternatives to traditional IQ batteries? In G. Canivez (Ed.), Assessing psychometric fitness of intelligence tests: Toward evidenced-based interpretation practices. Rowman & Littlefield. Lanham, MD
- Kush, J. C., & Canivez, G. L. (2021). Construct validity of the WISC–IV Italian Edition: A bifactor examination of the standardization sample: Chi niente sa, di niente dubita. International Journal of School and Educational Psychology. 9, 73-87. doi:10.1080/21683603.2019.1638854
- Kush, J. C. (2019). Correlates and stability of alternate stimuli in a computer-based measure of inspection time. The Journal of General Psychology. 146, 17-33. doi:10.1080/00221309.2018.1527282
- Kush, J. C. (2019). Incorporating meta-cognitive instruction in reading comprehension into philological training. Filologichni Traktaty, 11, 50-55. doi:10.21272/Ftrk.2019.11(2)-5.
- Kush, J. C. (2019). Computational thinking as a pedagogical tool for Ukrainian students. Professionalism of the Teacher: Theoretical and Methodological Aspects. Професіоналізм педагога: теоретичні й методичні аспекти, 9, 32-45. doi:10.31865/2414-9292.9.2019.174532
- Kush, J. C. (Editor). (2013). Intelligence Quotient: testing, Role of genetics and the environment and social outcomes. Hauppauge, NY: Nova Science Publishers. ISBN 978-1-62618-728-3
- Yamamoto, J., Kush, J. C., Lombard, R., & Hertzog, C. J. (Eds.), (2010). Technology implementation and teacher education: Reflective models. Information Science Publishing. ISBN 9781615208975
