= Kishori Shakti Yojana =

Indian scheme on empowering adolescent women

- State: Odisha
- Chief Minister: Naveen Patnaik
- Ministry: Women and child development, Odisha
- Launched: 31 Aug 2007

Kishori Shakti Yojana (lit. 'Adolescent Girl Empowerment Scheme') is a scheme initiated by Ministry of Women and Child Development in India, implemented by the Government of Odisha for juvenile girls aged 11 to 18 under the Integrated Child Development Services (ICDS) government programme. Its goal is to empower adolescent girls, to motivate them to be self-reliant, assist them in studies and vocation, promote health care, and give them exposure to society for gaining knowledge so that they can grow into responsible citizens.

== History ==
Kishori Shakti Yojana is a redesign of the former Adolescent Girls (AG) scheme under ICDS. It extends its coverage and enhances its content.

== Objectives ==
The objectives of the scheme are to assist girls between the ages of 11 and 18 in their studies and vocation, to make them aware of primary healthcare and hygiene, to give them a way to acquire broader knowledge and exposure to society, and to prepare them to be self-sufficient.
