= Cush (given name) =

Cush is a given name of the following notable people:

- Cush (Bible), the oldest son of Ham and a grandson of Noah in the Bible
- Cush Jumbo (born 1985), English actress

== See also ==
- Kush (given name)
