= Odisha State Child Protection Society =

- Government Organisation
- Motto: A Safety Net for Children
- Interactive map of Odisha State Child Protection Society
- Coordinates: 20.27°N 85.84°E
- Country: India
- State: Odisha
- Headquarters: Bhubaneswar

Government
  - Chairperson: Vishal Kumar Dev, IAS
  - Director: D. Prasanth Kumar Reddy, IAS
- Website: www.oscps.nic.in

Odisha State Child Protection Society (OSCPS) is the technical, fundamental and functional unit of Women & Child Development Department, Government of Odisha, for implementation of Integrated Child Protection Scheme (ICPS). OSCPS has been registered in the year 2009 under Society Registration Act. District Child Protection Units (DCPUs) as the extended bodies of OSCPS, have been constituted to carry out the activities of ICPS at district and sub-district level.

== Genesis ==
Women and Child development Department has signed a MoU with Ministry of Women and Child Development, GoI to implement Integrated Child Protection Scheme (ICPS) in the state of Odisha through Government and Civil Society Partnership. The aim of ICPS is focused on institutionalizing child protection mechanism and services, effective functioning of existing stake holders and regular capacity building and monitoring of child protection programme & activities. For creating a safety net for children and to ensure an efficient Juvenile Justice system in the state of Odisha, OSCPS through Integrated Child Protection Scheme lay special emphasis upon the children at most difficult situations such as Child in Need of Care and Protection, Juvenile in Conflict Law, Juvenile in Contact with Law and Other Vulnerable Children. Care and Protection of Vulnerable Children are being catered through various protection measures under this scheme. Separate units were set up comprising dedicated and skilled professionals for effective implementation of the scheme.

== Objectives ==
- To facilitate and operate in an additional and technical capacity to the W & CD Deptt., Govt. of Odisha for the implementation of Integrated Child Protection Scheme(ICPS) in the State.
- To set up DCPUs in all the districts
- To establish and strengthen a continuum of services for Emergency Outreach, Institutional Care, Family and Community based Care, Counseling and Support services.
- To strengthen necessary structures and mechanisms for effective implementation of the scheme at the state and district level.
- Define and set standards of all services including the functioning of statutory bodies.
- Build capacities of all functionaries including, administrators and service providers, at all levels by establishing partnerships with relevant State and National Agencies.
- Ensure that members of allied systems including, local bodies, police, judiciary and other concerned departments of State Governments are sensitized and trained to undertake desired responsibilities towards protection of child rights.
- Create mechanisms for a Child Protection Data Management System including MIS, Resource Directory and Child Tracking System at the district and state level for effective implementation and monitoring of child protection services in the state.

== Functions ==
- Contribution to the effective implementation of child protection legislation, schemes and achievement of child protection goals laid out in the National Plan of Action for Children. In doing so, OSCPS follows national and state priorities, rules and guidelines.
- Implementation, supervision and monitoring of ICPS and all other child protection scheme/programs and agencies/institutions at State level and district level.
- Setting up and monitoring District Child Protection Unit (DCPU). Providing financial support to DCPU for carrying out district level activities.
- Ensuring effective implementation of the Juvenile Justice (Care and Protection of Children) Act, 2000 and its subsequent amendments and Odisha Juvenile Justice (Care and Protection of Children) Rules.
- Ensuring of effective implementation of other legislations and policies for child protection in the State viz. Hindu Adoption and Maintenance Act (HAMA) 1956, Child Labour (Prohibition and Regulation) Act 1986, Child Marriage Prohibition Act 2006, and Immoral Traffic Prevention Act 1986, Pre-Conception and Pre-Natal Diagnostic Techniques (Prohibition of Sex Selection) Act 1994, Commissions for Protection of Child Rights Act 2005, Protection of Children from Sexual Offence Act 2012, etc. and any other Act that comes into force for protecting child rights.
- Networking and coordinating with all government departments to build inter-sectoral linkages on child protection issues, including Departments of Health, Education, Social Welfare, Urban Basic Services, Backward Classes & Minorities, Youth Services, Police, Judiciary, Labour, State AIDS Control Society, voluntary and civil organizations working in the field of child rights and protection.
- Carrying out need-based research and documentation activities at state-level for assessing the number of children in difficult circumstances and creating State-specific databases to monitor trends and patterns.
- Training and capacity development of all personnel (Government and Nongovernment) working under child protection system.
- Providing quarterly progress report to MWCD on Program implementation.
- Liaisoning with MWCD and State Child Protection Societies of other States/UTs.
- Providing secretarial support to the State Level Committees related Child Protection.
- Maintaining a state level database of all children in institutional care and family based non-institutional care and update it on a quarterly basis.
- Undertake need based innovative projects aimed at bringing efficiency in child protection mechanism in the state of Odisha.
- Conceptualize and develop materials for creating informed citizenship and child sensitive environment at all levels through awareness generation and raising concerns.

== Operation Smile ==
Operation Smile & Muskaan To locate, track and identify missing children of Odisha, OSCPS in W&CD Department collaborate with CID-Crime Branch in Odisha Police to execute joint operations within and outside the state twice every year. Children rescued during the operation get repatriated and rehabilitated to their families after rescue with due legal procedure.

== Rainbow Festival ==
Rainbow is a benchmark festival of Odisha State Child Protection Society, observed at state level every year followed by observance of its district chapters. Rainbow creates a platform of inclusive growth for children living in child care institutions and special need children, where the children showcase their innate abilities. This two-day-long residential festival involves a series of workshops, competitions, events, etc. where children get an opportunity for their creative reflection.
