= Kotal e Hindukush =

Kotal-e Hindukush
- (Dari: کوتل هندوکش)
- Interactive map of Kotal-e Hindukush
- Elevation: 4,053 metres (13,297 ft)

Third Approach
- Location: Afghanistan
- Range: Hindu Kush
- Coordinates: 35°16′27.6″N 68°54′23.1″E

Kotal-e Hindukush is a mountain pass in Parwan Province, Afghanistan. It is 205 m lower than the Band e Hindukush pass, one of the highest passes in the country.
