= Kush (satrapy) =

Satrapy of the Achaemenid Empire

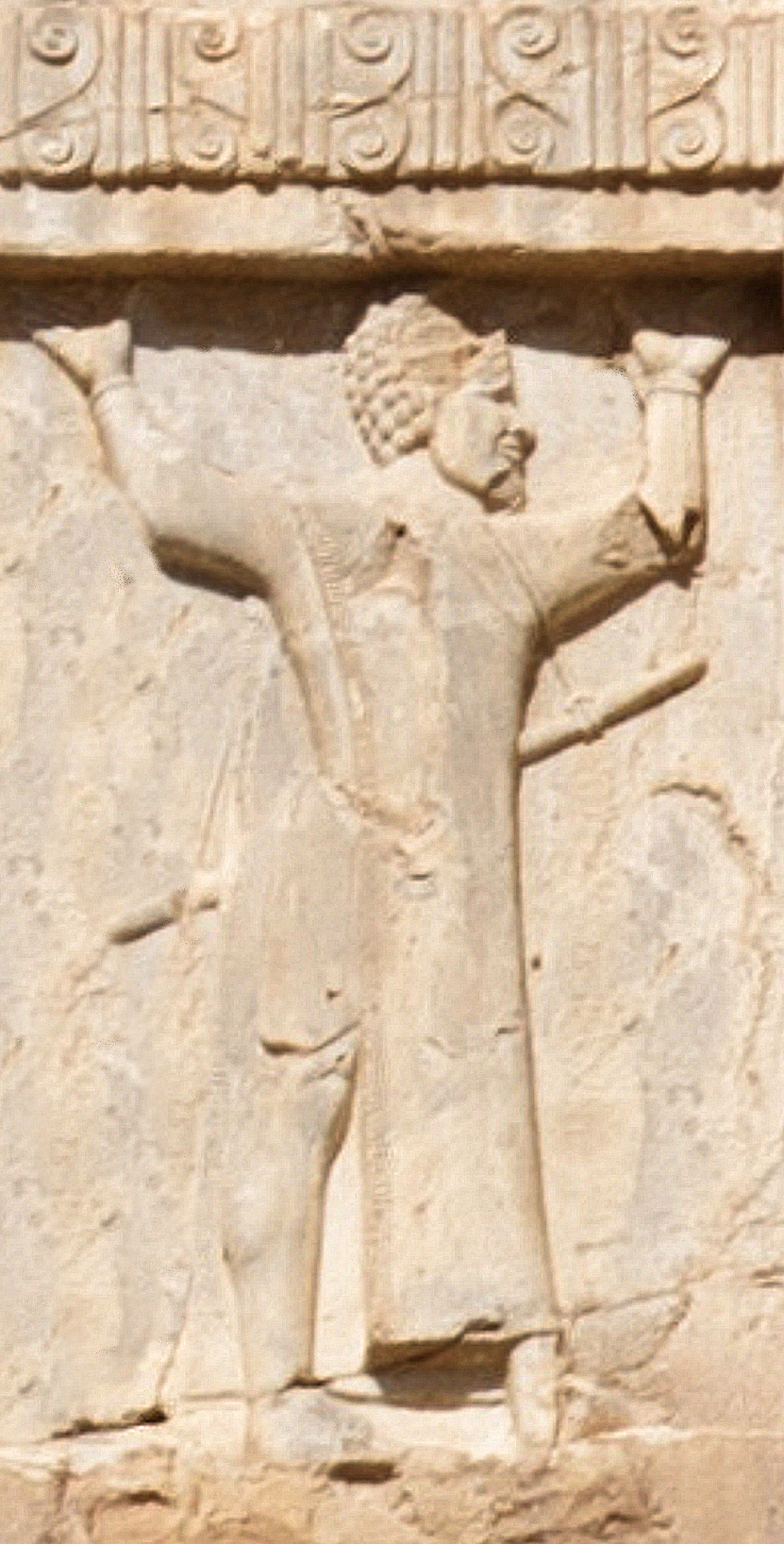
Ethiopian (Kušiya) soldier of the Achaemenid army, circa 480 BCE. Xerxes I tomb relief.

Kush (Old Persian: 𐎤𐎢𐏁𐎠𐎹) was a satrapy of the Achaemenid Empire. The territory was conquered from the Kingdom of Kush. Herodotus mentioned an invasion of Kush by the Achaemenid ruler Cambyses II (c. 530 BC). By some accounts Cambyses succeeded in occupying the area between the first and second Nile cataract, however Herodotus mentions that "his expedition failed miserably in the desert.". Achaemenid inscriptions from both Egypt and Iran include Kush as part of the Achaemenid empire. For example, the inscription of Darius the Great (r. 522–486 BC) on his tomb at Naqsh-e Rostam mentions Kūšīyā (Old Persian: 𐎤𐎢𐏁𐎡𐎹𐎠, pronounced Kūshīyā) among the territories being "ruled over" by the Achaemenid Empire. Derek Welsby states "scholars have doubted that this Persian expedition ever took place, but... archaeological evidence suggests that the fortress of Dorginarti near the second cataract served as Persia's southern boundary." The Book of Esther describes Ahasuerus as ruling an Empire that extended from Hodu (usually translated as India) to Kush.
