= Vladimir Kush =

Russian painter

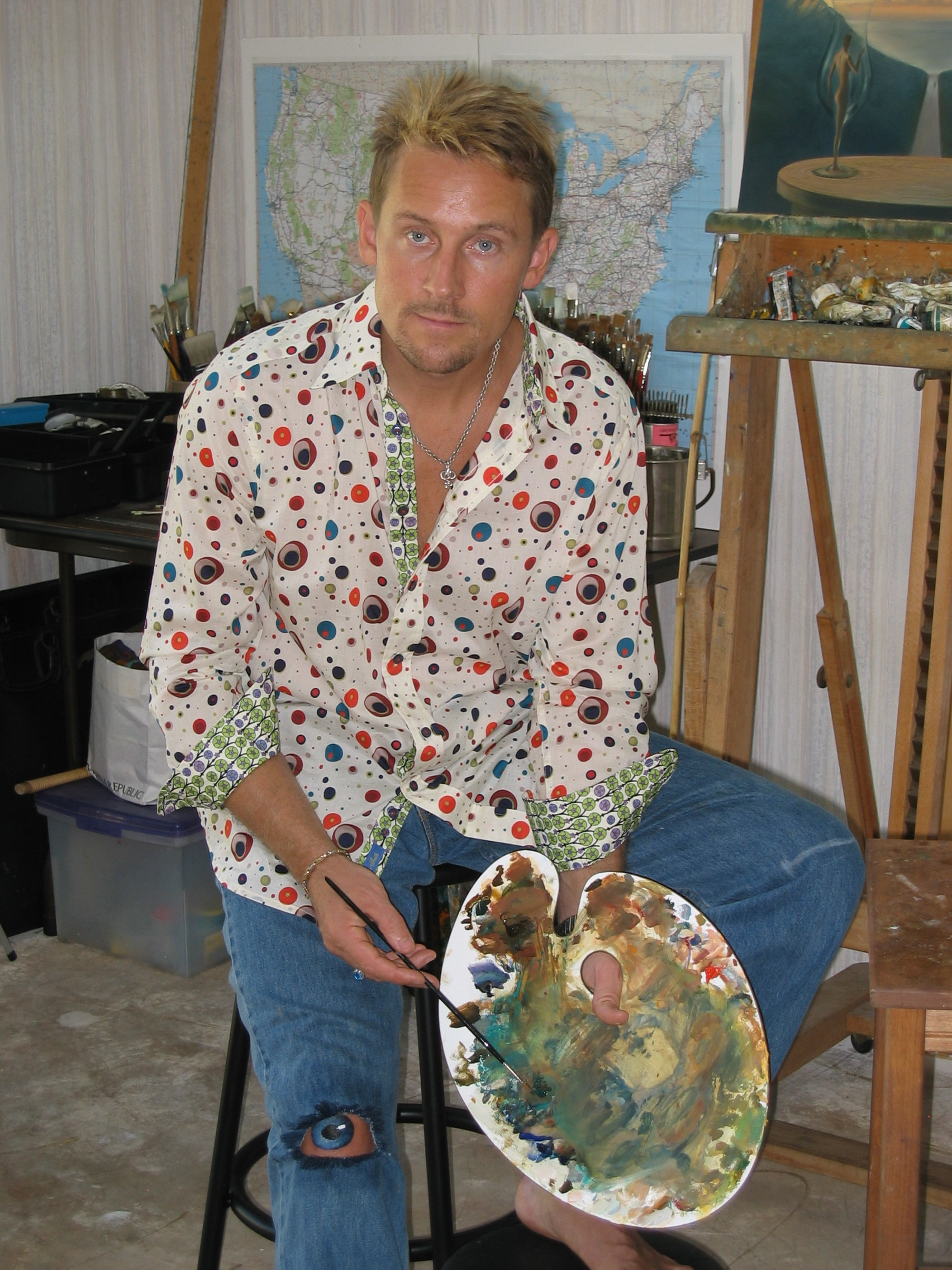
- Kush painting To Our Time Together (2004)
- Born: 1965 (age 60–61); Moscow, Russia
- Education: Surikov Moscow Art Institute
- Known for: Painting and sculpture
- Notable work: Departure of the Winged Ship
- Movement: Metaphorical Realism
- Spouse: Oxana Kush
- Website: kushfineart.com

Vladimir Kush (born 1965) is a Russian-born American painter, jewelry designer and sculptor. He studied at the Surikov Moscow Art Institute, and after several years working as an artist in Moscow, his native city, he emigrated to the United States, and established a gallery on the island of Maui in Hawaii. His oil paintings are also sold as giclée prints which contributed to his popularity and led to the establishment of further galleries in Laguna Beach, California, and Las Vegas, Nevada, Miami, Florida .

== Biography ==
Kush was born in 1965 in Moscow, Russia. After studying at the Surikov Moscow Art Institute, he was conscripted into the Soviet Army for two years where he was assigned to paint murals. In 1987, he began exhibiting with the USSR Union of Artists but earned a living drawing portraits on the streets of Moscow and caricatures for a newspaper. In 1990, following his first foreign exhibition in Germany with two other Russian artists, he emigrated to the United States, initially living in Los Angeles before moving to Hawaii where he also worked as a mural painter for the Whaler's Village Museum on Maui. While based in Hawaii, his works received several exhibitions in Hong Kong galleries. Gallery shows followed in Seattle, Pittsburgh, and other American cities, and he eventually opened his own gallery, Kush Fine Art in Lahaina, Hawaii.

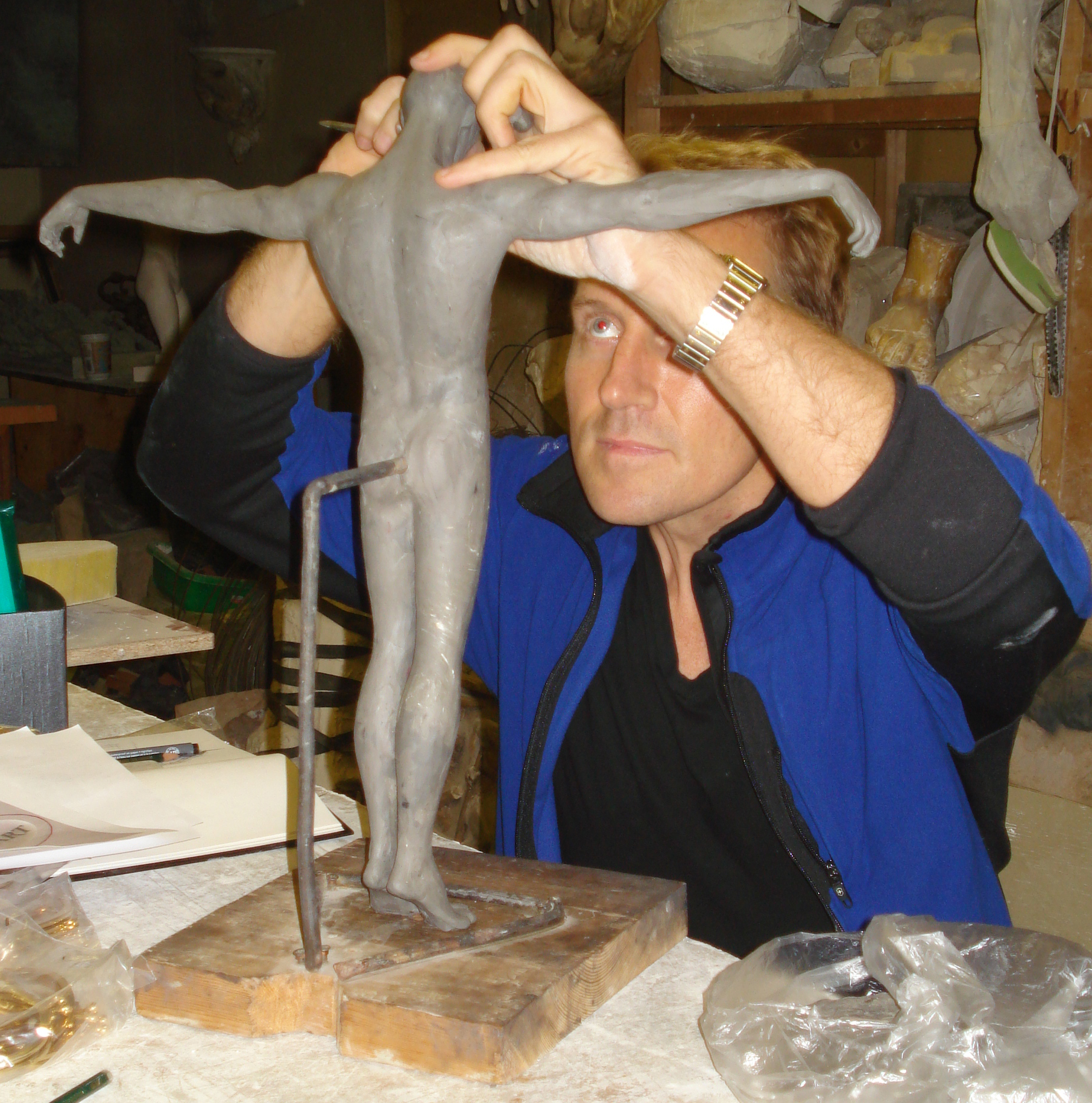
Kush moulding a sculpture based on his painting Pros and Cons

He later opened Kush Fine Art galleries in Las Vegas and Laguna Beach, California. Many of his original oil paintings are also sold as giclée prints which initially contributed to his popularity. In 2007 Kush sued the pop singer Pink and her record company for copyright infringement when imagery from his painting (and later giclée print), Contes Erotiques, was used without his authorisation for her 2006 video U + Ur Hand. The case was settled the following year when the singer agreed to pay him undisclosed damages. Prints and an original oil painting by Kush are held in the NaPua Gallery collection at the Grand Wailea Resort on Maui in addition to works held in private collections. In July 2011 his works were shown at the Artistes du Monde international exhibition in Cannes where he won the American First Prize in Painting. He also has a resident show in Las Vegas, Nevada, at Caesars Palace. In 2019, Kush filed a lawsuit against pop singer Ariana Grande for copyright infringement, claiming that his paintings The Candle and The Candle 2 were used without permission in her music video "God Is a Woman". The lawsuit is now settled.

== Style and works ==
Kush predominantly works in the medium of oil painting on canvas or board, with many of the original paintings also sold as limited edition giclée-on-canvas prints. His bronze-colored sculptures are small-scale and usually based on imagery from his paintings, such as Walnut of Eden and Pros and Cons. Although his style is frequently described as surrealist, Kush himself refers to it as "Metaphorical Realism" and cites the early influence on his style of Salvador Dalí's surrealist paintings as well as landscapes by the German romantic painter Caspar David Friedrich. The artist was greatly influenced by the work of and personal acquaintance with the French ‘magic realist’ Claude Verlinde whose paintings, full of an acute sense of drama in the story of man and his times, often paradoxical in appearance, are, perhaps, closest to his own metaphorical style.

Sky and color-saturated seascapes are frequent themes in his paintings, exemplified in the companion pieces, Arrival of the Flower Ship and Departure of the Winged Ship. Flowing water is another recurrent theme, exemplified by Breach and Current. Other works such as Three Graces and African Sonata merge human and animal forms with inanimate objects.

=== List of paintings ===
Original paintings by Kush include:

- African Sonata (oil on canvas, 21 in × 24 in or 530 mm × 610 mm) – Elephants with giant tubas for faces are depicted at a watering hole on the plains of Africa.
- Arrival of the Flower Ship (2000, oil on canvas, 39 1/2 in × 31 1/2 in or 1,000 mm × 800 mm) – A white sailing ship approaches harbour on a calm sea. Its sails are depicted as giant pink flowers. Shadowy human figures approach the ship in small boats, each made from a single flower petal, while others watch from shore.
- Breach (late 1990s, oil on canvas) – Shown in the 1997 exhibit "From Gulag to Glasnost: Contemporary Art from Russia" at the International Images Gallery near Pittsburgh, the painting depicts a drained ocean surrounded by mountains, with a group of human figures in the foreground tossing a giant whale on a tarpaulin made of the sea water.
- Current (2000, oil on canvas, 16 in × 20 in or 410 mm × 510 mm) – The painting (often reproduced as a print) depicts the solitary figure of a naked man rowing a small boat through swirling water in a flooded landscape.
- Departure of the Winged Ship (circa 2000, oil on canvas, 39 in × 31 in or 990 mm × 790 mm) – Widely reproduced as a print, the painting depicts a three-masted sailing ship heading out to the open sea on a windy day. Its sails are formed by giant butterflies.
- Family Tree (oil on canvas) – A house is depicted as a giant tree with its upper branches still in construction. Greg Stacey wrote in OC Weekly: "It's like something out of a Bosch painting, a work any artist could be proud of. But ugh, that literal-minded title!"
- Fauna in La Mancha (oil on canvas size 30, 5x43) –A man stands in a field with a butterfly net, surrounded by butterfly windmills, a nod to the work of Miguel Cervantes-and his classic novel, Don Quijote de La Mancha.
- Three Graces (oil on canvas 11 in × 14 in or 280 mm × 360 mm) – Three dancing ballerinas on a chessboard-like stage are depicted with spinning tops for legs.
- Wind (1997, oil on canvas, 35 1/2 in × 43 1/2 in or 900 mm × 1,100 mm) – An isolated two-storey house is depicted with a huge blue shirt billowing out of its roof and windows while shadowy human figures gather with ladders. A giant pocket watch hangs from a chain over the side of the building.
- Winged Satellite (2000, oil on canvas) – A giant moth is depicted circling the earth as a metallic satellite with solar panel wings.
- Symphony of the Sun featured as the cover art on the Bill Champlin 2021 Release "Livin' For Love"

== Publications ==
- Kush, Vladimir (2002). Metaphorical Journey. Kush Fine Art New York Inc. ISBN 0-9765298-0-7
- Journey to the Edge of Time (illustrations by Vladimir Kush; text by Kush's father, Oleg Kush and his uncle Mikhail Kush). Kush Fine Art. ISBN 0-9765298-1-5
- Artist Proof (2015) Kush Fine Art New York Inc. (a 188-page magazine relating to Kush's work).
