= Youth in Indian politics =

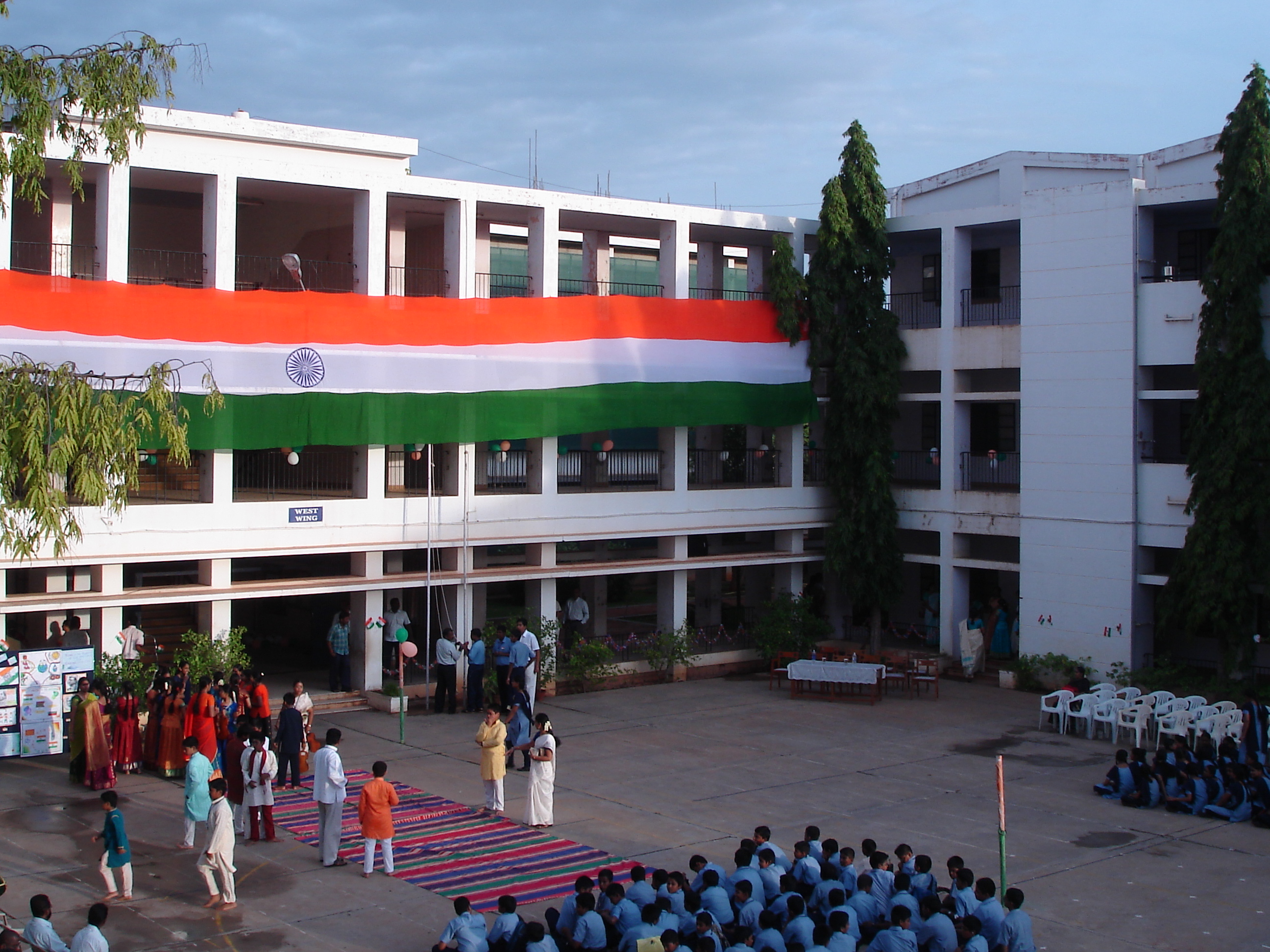
Independence Day in TVSMHSS, during which the cause of youth in Indian Politics was strongly stressed with means of a Skit.

Many initiatives were taken in many schools to develop the interest among students to enter Indian politics. The field of politics in India is usually perceived as something that is not suited to the educated masses and this perception is being changed by many school students who take up the idea of politics as their career and help promoting the cause.

== Importance of youth in Indian politics ==
In 2004, 57% of the Indian population was aged 30 years or younger; however, only 35 out of 543 Lok Sabha members (6%) were aged under 30 . Nevertheless, the World Values Survey showed that the proportion of people aged 18–24 who identified themselves as "very" or "rather" interested in politics was around 50%, an increase of 15% since 1990. All major political parties have youth and student wings, such as Indian Youth Congress, Akhil Bharatiya Vidyarthi Parishad, and Democratic Youth Federation of India. A campaign by Young India Foundation has been raising awareness on the importance of youth rights and the essential representation they need in a country with over 670 million people below the age of 25. YIF is also leading in the Age of Candidacy campaign which is working on decreasing the age of candidacy in India from 25 to something lower.

== Use of social media ==
As per a report by the Associated Chambers of Commerce and Industry of India (ASSOCHAM), of the approximately ₹4,000–5,000 crore total advertisement and publicity spend in 2014 Indian Parliament elections, the digital platforms can expect to garner at least ₹400–500 crore. The target audience are predictably the youth, many of them first-time voters.
