= Cush (surname) =

Cush is the surname of the following notable people:

- Adrian Cush (born 1970), Gaelic footballer
- Lennox Cush (born 1974), Guyanese–American cricketer
- Malachi Cush (born 1980), Irish singer-songwriter
- Tom Cush (born 1961/1962), American paralympic athlete
- Wilbur Cush (1928–1981), Northern Irish football player

== See also ==
- Cushing (surname)
- Kush (surname)
