= Hindukush (Jowzjan) =

Hindukush هندوكش
- Village
- Location within Afghanistan
- Coordinates: 36°54′14″N 66°16′4″E
- Country: Afghanistan
- Province: Jowzjan Province
- District: Aqcha District
- Elevation: 299 m (981 ft)

Hindukusch (Persian: هندوکش) is a location near BajgirAqcha (Persian: آقچه) in Aqcha District, Jowzjan Province in northern Afghanistan. The settlement is situated 6 km from Aqchah near Aqcha south of the settlement Haidarabad (Persian: حيدرآباد) and is about 65 km from Balkh (ancient town).
