= Akankshya Yojana =

Social welfare program in Odisha, India

Akankshya Yojana is a social welfare programme initiated by the Government of Odisha, in India, for tribal people in that state.

Akankshya Yojana provides hostels to tribal students pursuing higher education in various fields. In 2015, the Government of Odisha provided facilitated hostels to 3.5 lakh students falling under the Scheduled Caste (SC) and Scheduled Tribe (ST) category.
