= Kushi (Utamaro) =

Woodblock print by Kitagawa Utamaro

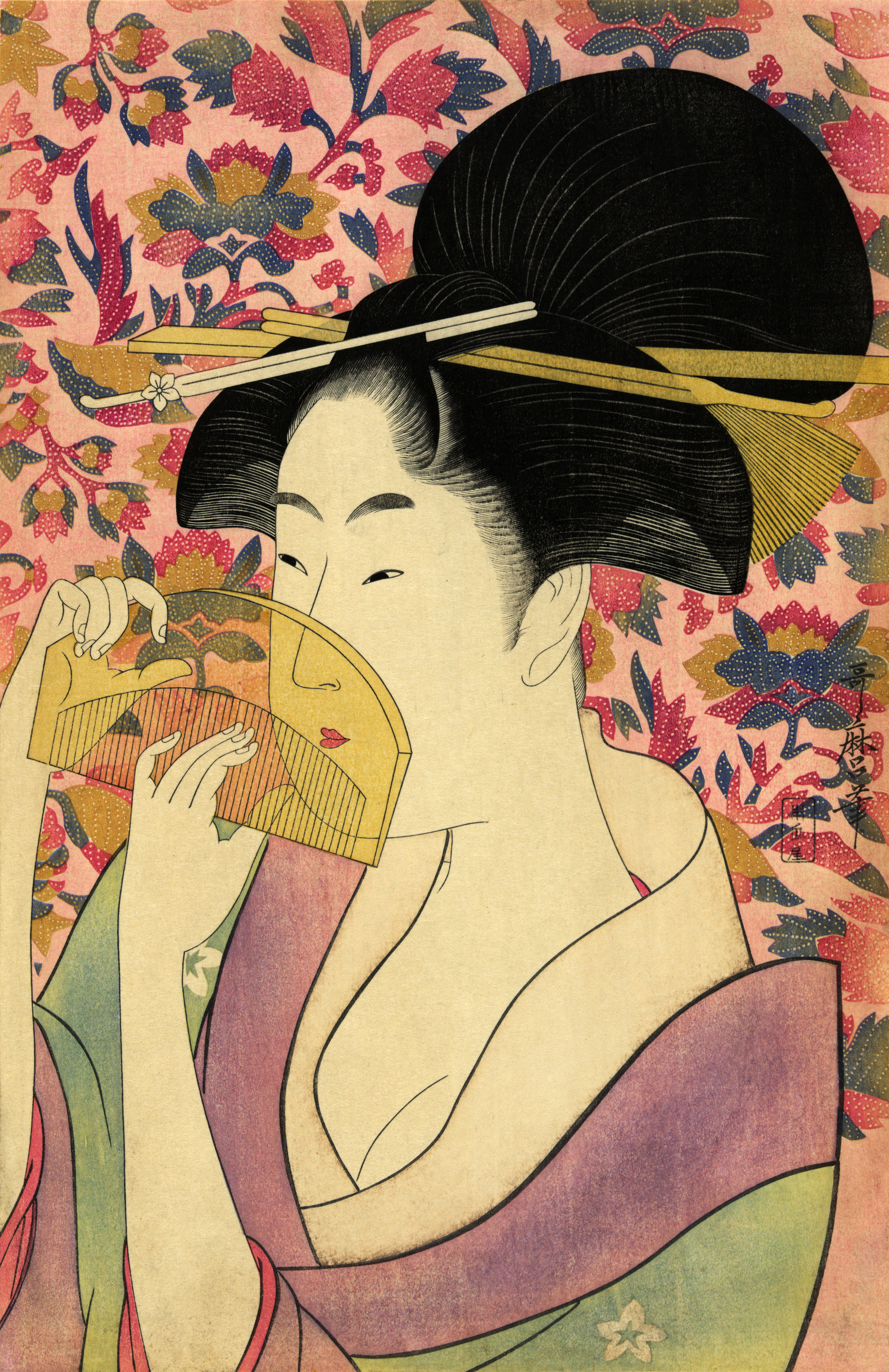
Kushi, Utamaro, multicolour woodblock print, c. 1795–96

Kushi (櫛, "Comb", c. 1795–96) is a title given to a print by the Japanese ukiyo-e artist Kitagawa Utamaro. It depicts a woman looking through a clear glass comb.

== Background ==
Ukiyo-e art flourished in Japan during the Edo period from the 17th to 19th centuries, and took as its primary subjects courtesans, kabuki actors, and others associated with the "floating world" lifestyle of the pleasure districts. Alongside paintings, mass-produced woodblock prints were a major form of the genre. In the mid-18th century full-colour nishiki-e prints became common, printed using a large number of woodblocks, one for each colour. A prominent genre was bijin-ga ("pictures of beauties"), which depicted most often courtesans and geisha at leisure, and promoted the entertainments of the pleasure districts.

Kitagawa Utamaro (c. 1753–1806) made his name in the 1790s with his bijin ōkubi-e ("large-headed pictures of beautiful women") portraits, focusing on the head and upper torso, a style others had previously employed in portraits of kabuki actors. Utamaro experimented with line, colour, and printing techniques to bring out subtle differences in the features, expressions, and backdrops of subjects from a wide variety of class and background. Utamaro's individuated beauties were in sharp contrast to the stereotyped, idealized images that had been the norm.

== Description and analysis ==
A woman holds up a transparent comb, most likely of glass. Her lower face can easily been seen through it.

It was published in ōban size (about 39 by 26 centimetres, 15 in × 10 in) c. 1795–96 by Ōmiya Gonkurō.

Utamaro made a hand-fan painting similar to this print c. 1802–03 called Giyaman Oshima (ぎやまんおしま). The name is inscribed on the fan. Giyaman is an Edo-period Japanese word for "glass", so the name translates as "Glass Oshima". She was likely a popular beauty in Edo of the day.

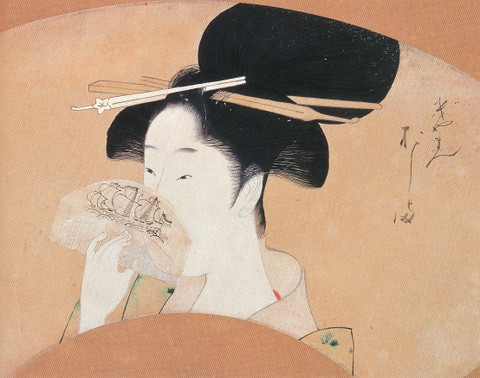
Giyaman Oshima, hand-fan painting, c. 1802–03

== See also ==
- Ukiyo-e
- Bijin-ga
