= Kush (given name) =

Kush is an Indian masculine given name that may refer to the following notable people:

- Kusha (Ramayana), one of the twin sons of Lord Rama and Sita
- Kush Arora, dub and bhangra music producer from San Francisco
- Kush Bhagat (born 2009), Indian chess player
- Kush Kumar (born 1996), Indian squash player
- Kush Maini (born 2000), Indian racing driver

== See also ==
- Cush (given name)
