= KALIA Yojana =

Welfare scheme of the Government of Odisha

Krushak Assistance for Livelihood and Income Augmentation (KALIA) Scheme
- କୃଷକ ସହାୟତା ଜୀବିକା ଓ ଆୟ ବୃଦ୍ଧି ପାଇଁ ଯୋଜନା
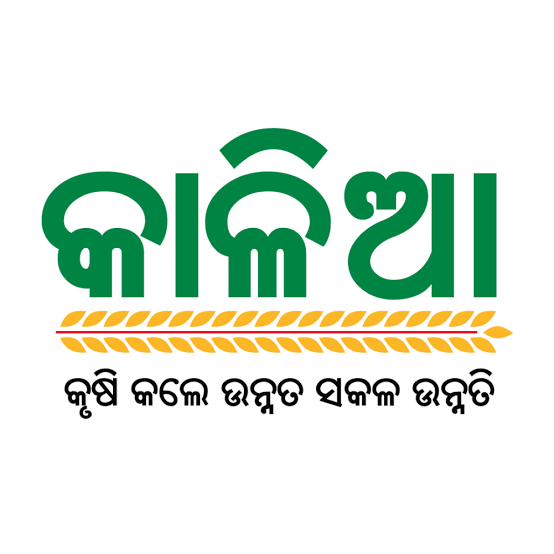
- Type of project: Farmer welfare scheme
- Country: India
- State: Odisha
- Chief Minister: Naveen Patnaik
- Key people: Naveen Patnaik (Former Chief Minister of Odisha)
- Launched: 21 December 2018; Odisha, India
- Disestablished: 2024
- Budget: ₹10,000 crores
- Website: kalia.odisha.gov.in
- Status: Closed

KALIA (Krushak Assistance for Livelihood and Income Augmentation) was a farmer welfare scheme launched by the Government of Odisha in 2018 to provide financial, livelihood, cultivation, and insurance support to farmers, sharecroppers, and agricultural labourers in the Indian state of Odisha. After BJP won elections in 2024, it was replaced by the PM Kishan Scheme under Chief Minister Mohan Charan Majhi.

The scheme was launched by Chief Minister Naveen Patnaik on 21 December 2018 with the objective of reducing poverty and improving agricultural productivity and rural livelihoods.

== Background ==
The KALIA Scheme was introduced to help the small and marginal farmers of Odisha to address issues like debt, lack of access to institutional credit and financial risks associated with crops. The scheme was meant to provide direct financial support to vulnerable farming households.

== Implementation ==
The scheme was being implemented through direct benefit transfer (DBT) under which the financial assistance is transferred directly to the bank accounts of beneficiaries.

Identification of beneficiaries was done by local administration and agriculture departments of Govt. of Odisha.

== See also ==
- CM Kishan Yojana
- Agriculture in India
- Pradhan Mantri Kisan Samman Nidhi
- Government of Odisha
- Naveen Patnaik
