= Silsilah ye Koh e Hindukush =

Hindukush
- (Dari: سلسلۀ کوه هندوکش)
- Location within Afghanistan

Highest point
- Elevation: 4,353 m (14,281 ft)
- Parent peak: Hindu Kush
- Coordinates: 35°16′26.3″N 68°50′36.6″E

Geography
- Location: Parwan, Parwan Province, Afghanistan
- Parent range: Hindu Kush

Devon Koh-e Hindukush (Dari: سلسلۀ کوه هندوکش) is a mountain of Hindu Kush in Parwan Province near Baghlan, Afghanistan.
