= Kushi (mountains) =

Mountain in Pakistan

- Location within Pakistan

Highest point
- Elevation: 2,349 m (7,707 ft)
- Parent peak: Hindu Kush
- Coordinates: 28°50′32.4″N 66°34′26.8″E

Geography
- Location: Balochistan, Pakistan
- Parent range: Toba Kakar Range

Kushi is a mountain located in Pakistan, and part of the Toba Kakar Range.
