= Madhu Babu Pension Yojana =

Pension scheme

- Type: Government
- Industry: Social Security
- Founded: Bhubaneswar, Odisha, India (1 January 2008)
- Headquarters: Bhubaneswar, India
- Area served: Odisha
- Website: ssepd.gov.in

The Madhu Babu Pension Yojana(MBPY) is a pension scheme introduced in the Indian State of Odisha with the objective of providing financial assistance to destitute, elderly, and disabled individuals in the state.

== About the scheme ==
The Madhu Babu Pension Yojana (MBPY) is a beneficial scheme initiated under the Department of Social Security and Empowerment of Persons with Disabilities for disabled people, old age persons in the state of Odisha, India. The Madhu Babu Pension Yojana was launched by Chief Minister of Odisha, w.e.f. 01.01.2008 by merging the two pension schemes i.e. namely, Revised Old Age Pension Rules, 1989 and Disability Pension Rules, 1985.

== Criteria for eligibility ==
Under the provisions of the scheme, the following persons shall be eligible for the pension.

- If the person is of 60 years of age and above (OAP)
- If the person is a widow (irrespective of age) (WP)
- If the person is a leprosy patient with visible signs of deformity (irrespective of age) (PLP)
- If the person is a person of 0 years of age or above and unable to do normal work due to his/her deformity or disability being blind or orthopedically handicapped or hearing and speech impaired or intellectually disabled or with cerebral palsy or with autism or with mental illness or with multiple disabilities (DP)
- or if the person is a widow of AIDS patient (irrespective of age and income criteria mentioned under Rule 6 (b) (WP-AIDS) of MBPY Rules, 2008.
- or if an AIDS patient identified by the State/District AIDS Control Society or district AIDS prevention control Unit (DAPCU) (irrespective of income as under Rule 6 (b). (PP-AIDS)
- Or is an unmarried woman above 30 years belonging to a BPL Family or has individual income from all sources not exceeding Rs.24,000/- (Rupees twenty-four thousand) only per annum irrespective of the family income

However, the other criteria to be eligible under the scheme is-

- He/She must be a permanent resident/domicile of Odisha
- He/She must not been convicted of any criminal offence involving moral turpitude
- He/She must not in receipt of any other pension from the Union Government or the State Government or any organisation aided by either Government.
- He/She must be a

The amount of pension payable to each pensioner under the scheme shall be of such amount as may be decided by Government from time to time. The pension amount normally gets transferred on 15th of every month to the bank account of the beneficiary. However, beneficiary can also choose to disburse the pension amount on the Jan Seva Diwas at the Gram Panchayat Office or Block Development Office.
