= Khushi Scheme =

Female Health and Hygiene Program

- Native name: ଖୁସି ଯୋଜନା
- Company type: Women welfare scheme
- Founded: 2018
- Founder: Government of Odisha
- Area served: Odisha
- Key people: Naveen Patnaik
- Owner: Government of Odisha

Khushi (meaning "Happiness" in Odia) is a female health and hygiene program run by the Government of Odisha to provide free sanitary pads to girl students in Odisha. It was launched on February 26, 2018, by the Chief Minister of Odisha Naveen Patnaik. The Government of Odisha will spend 70 Crore Indian rupees annually for running this program in the state.

== About the Scheme ==
Under this scheme, the Health Department of Odisha Government aims to provide free sanitary pads to 1.7 million girl students from grade 6th to 12th in government and government-aided schools. Also, it aims to promote health and hygiene among school going girls and higher retention of girls in school.
