= Timeline of the Narendra Modi premiership =

Narendra Modi has served as the Prime Minister of India since 2014. The following is a timeline of major events of his premiership from his inauguration on 26 May 2014 till now.

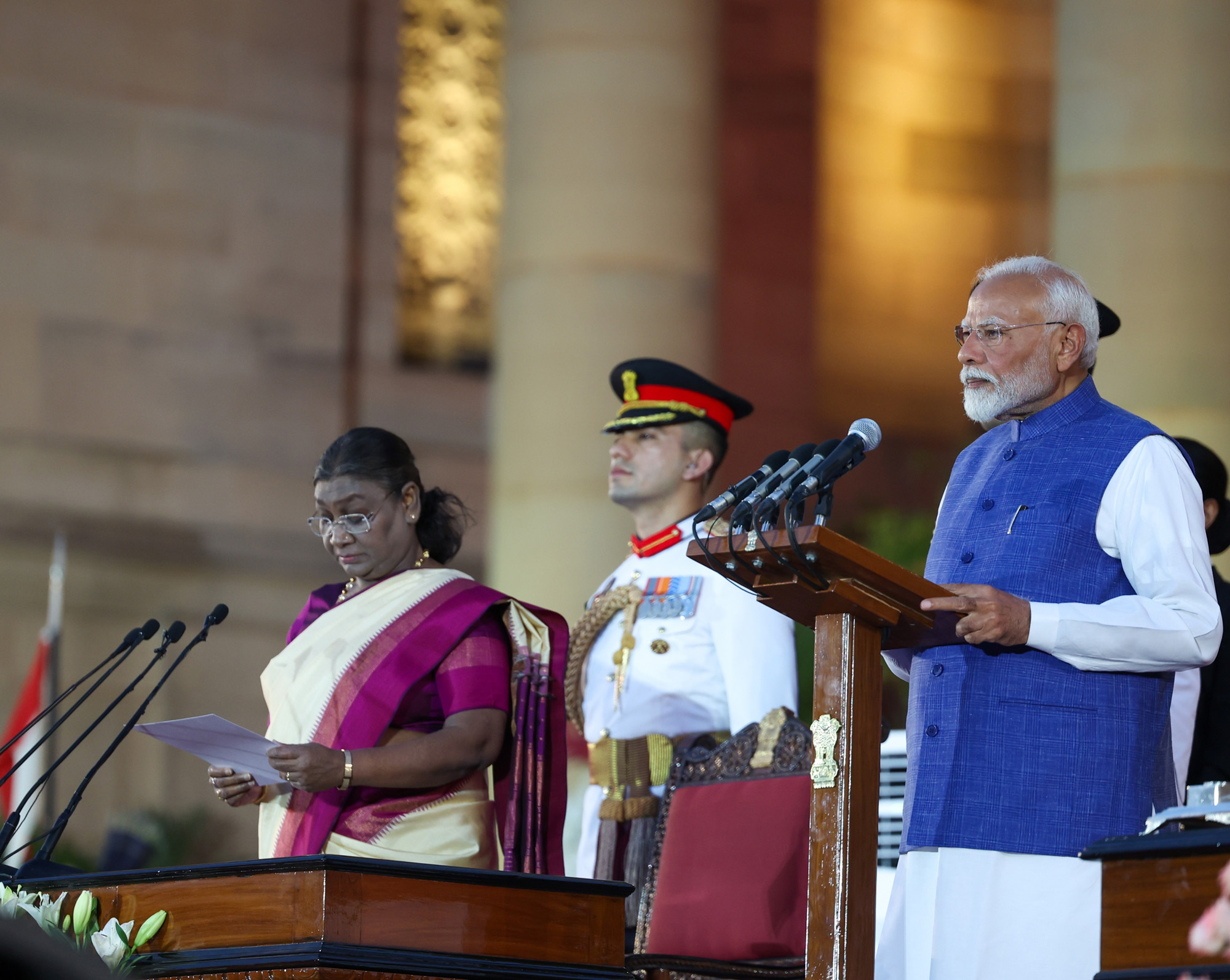
Narendra Modi with President, Droupadi Murmu administering the oath of his third term.

== 2014 ==
=== May 2014 ===
- 16 May – Modi wins the 2014 Indian general election from Varanasi as a Lok Sabha member.
- 26 May – Modi Sworn in as the prime minister of India at the Rashtrapati Bhawan, New Delhi.
- 27 May – Modi held bilateral talks with each visiting head of state/head of government of eight SAARC nation plus Mauritius at Hyderabad House, New Delhi. This event was dubbed as mini SAARC summit in the media.

=== June 2014 ===
- 15–16 June – Modi made his first foreign visit to Bhutan following an invitation by King Jigme Khesar Namgyel Wangchuck and Tobgay. The visit was called by the media as a "charm offensive" that would also seek to check Bhutan-China relations that had recently been formalised. He also sought to build business ties, including a hydro-electric deal and inaugurated the India-funded Supreme Court of Bhutan building in Thimphu. While talking about the visit, Modi said that Bhutan was a "natural choice" for his first foreign destination because of the "unique and special relationship" the two countries shared. He added that he was looking forward to nurture and further strengthen India's special relations with Bhutan. His entourage included Foreign Minister Sushma Swaraj, National Security Adviser Ajit Doval and Foreign Secretary Sujatha Singh. He was further set to discuss the insurgency in Northeast India, and China.
- 30 June – Modi went to the Satish Dhawan Space Centre (SHAR) in Sriharikota, Andhra Pradesh to witness the launch of PSLV C23 carrying French satellite SPOT-7 along with other smaller foreign satellites. He also expressed his intention of funding a unique SAARC satellite for the use of all South Asian nations.

=== July 2014 ===
- 13–16 July – In July 2014, he visited Brazil for his first multilateral visit, the 6th BRICS summit was held at the north-eastern beach city of Fortaleza. In the Fortaleza summit the group have agreed to establish a financial institution rivaling the western dominated World Bank and IMF, The bank would be named the New Development Bank as suggested by the Indian side but Modi government failed to bag the bank's headquarter for New Delhi, which would be located in Shanghai, China. Later the BRICS leader also attended an event in Brasília where they met the UNASUR heads of government. At the same time, the Ministry of External Affairs added Spanish to its list of available languages, which the Hindustan Times read as "indicative of the government's intent to go beyond Europe, Asia and the US to forge diplomatic and trade ties with Latin American nations." He travelled there via Germany.
- 16 July – Modi met the Brazilian President, Dilma Rousseff on the sidelines of the 6th BRICS summit in Brasília, Brazil, in July 2014.

=== August 2014 ===
- 2 August - The Swachh Bharat campaign to eliminate open defecation is launched
- 28 August - Pradhan Mantri Jan Dhan Yojana was formally launched.

=== September 2014 ===
- 1 to 2 September – Two day trip by Modi to Japan. He met Shinzo Abe at Akasaka Palace, in Tokyo, Japan.
- 5 September – Modi meets the Australian Prime Minister, Tony Abbott on his State Visit to India and holds talks on bilateral, regional and other important issues.
- 8 September – PM visits Jammu and Kashmir; reviews situation in flood affected areas.
- 10 September – Modi meets Emeritus Senior Minister (ESM) of Singapore, Goh Chok Tong.
- 11 September – Modi chairs a high-level meeting on Mission Swacch Bharat; calls for making it a mass movement and linking it to economic activity.
- 17 September – Modi and General Secretary of the Chinese Communist Party, Xi Jinping witness signing of 3 MoUs in Ahmedabad, Gujarat.
- 19 September – Modi meets Bill Gates and Melinda Gates.
- 24 September – Modi was at the ISRO headquarter in Bangalore to witness the Martian orbit insertion of Mars Orbiter Mission.
- 25 September – Modi unveils the global ‘Make in India’ initiative.
- 26 September – Five day trip to US invited by Barack Obama, included attending the sixty-ninth session of the United Nations General Assembly in New York.
- 27 September – Modi addresses the United Nations General Assembly.
- 28 September – PM addresses Indian Community at Madison Square Garden in New York; announces sweeping changes in PIO and OCI schemes.
- 29 September – Modi addresses the Council on Foreign Relations in New York City.
- 30 September – Modi visits Martin Luther King Memorial.

=== October 2014 ===
- 2 October - Modi launches Swachh Bharat Mission.
- 3 October - First show of Mann Ki Baat is held.

== 2015 ==
=== March 2015 ===
- 23 March – Trip to Singapore.

==== April 2015 ====
- 9 April – Trip to France.
- 12 April – Trip to Germany.
- 14 April – Trip to Canada.

=== May 2015 ===
- 9 May – Modi launches Jan Suraksha Schemes.
- 17 May – Trip to China.
- 18 May – Trip to Mongolia.
- 19 May – Trip to South Korea.
- 25 May – Modi addresses a rally in Mathura.
- 26 May – Modi launches DD Kisan.

=== June 2015 ===
- 6 June - Trip to Bangladesh
- 7 June - On behalf of Atal Bihari Vajpayee, PM Narendra Modi receives the Bangladesh Liberation War honour.
- 9 June - Assesses healthcare initiatives.
- 11 June – Bangladesh Liberation War Honour presented to Atal Bihari Vajpayee was handed over to family members by PM Narendra Modi.
- 21 June – First Yoga Day Celebrated, led by PM Narendra Modi in New Delhi. This gathering was held at Raj Path, New Delhi, India.
- 24 June - Launches Pradhan Mantri Awas Yojana for providing houses for rural and urban low and mid income group.

=== July 2015 ===
- 6 July – Trip to Uzbekistan.
- 8 July – Trip to Kazakhstan.
- 10 July – Trip to Russia to attend BRICS and SCO summit in Ufa, Russia.
- 13 July - PM Narendra Modi's visit to Tajikistan.

== 2016 ==
=== February 2016 ===
- 28 February - Modi first talked of the target of doubling farmers' income at a farmer's rally in Uttar Pradesh.

=== May 2016 ===
- 1 May - Launches Pradhan Mantri Ujjwala Yojana for providing free LPG connection to poor women.
- 9 May - Pradhan Mantri Jeevan Jyoti Bima Yojana launched by Modi.

=== November 2016 ===
- 8 November – Announcement of demonetization of Indian currency denominations of Rs 500 and 1000.

== 2017 ==
=== August 2017 ===
- The BJP Government formulated the Triple talaq Ban after 100 cases of instant triple talaq in the country since the Supreme Court judgement in August 2017.

=== December 2017 ===
- 25 December - Modi inaugurates Delhi Metro's magenta line, addresses public meeting in Noida
- 28 December – Lok Sabha passed The Muslim Women (Protection of Rights on Marriage) Bill, 2017. The bill make instant triple talaq (talaq-e-biddah) in any form – spoken, in writing or by electronic means such as email, SMS and WhatsApp illegal and void, with up to three years in jail for the husband. MPs from RJD, AIMIM, BJD, AIADMK and AIML opposed the bill, calling it arbitrary in nature and a faulty proposal, while Congress supported the Bill tabled in Lok Sabha by law minister Ravi Shankar Prasad. 19 amendments were moved in Lok Sabha but all were rejected.

== 2018 ==
=== October 2018 ===
- 31 October 2018 - The world's tallest statue, the Statue of Unity, was inaugurated by Modi.

=== November 2018 ===
- 25 November – 50th edition of Mann Ki Baat held.

== 2019 ==
=== January 2019 ===
- 3 January – Modi attended 106th Science Congress.
- 8 January – India's lower house of parliament approves a bill that would grant residency and citizenship rights to non-Muslim immigrants Hindus, Sikhs, Buddhists, Jains, Parsis and Christians from three Muslim-majority countries - Bangladesh, Pakistan and Afghanistan - eligible for Indian citizenship. the Bill excludes Muslims.

=== February 2019 ===
- 3 February - Modi launches multiple development projects in Srinagar. Modi lays foundation stone and inaugurates development projects in Jammu. Modi lays foundation stone and inaugurates development projects in Leh
- 11 February - Modi takes part in the 3 billionth meal of Akshaya Patra mid-day meal programme in Vrindavan
- 14 February – 2019 Pulwama attack took place resulting in death of 40 CRPF personnel while Narendra Modi was shooting for Discovery in Jim Corbett National park.
- 26 February – Authorizes air strike on Balakot terrorist camp in Pakistan.
- 29 February – Inaugurates the National War memorial.

=== May 2019 ===
- 23 May – Wins for the second time as Member of Parliament from the city of Varanasi.
- 30 May – Sworn in for the second time as the 15th Prime Minister of India at the Rashtrapati Bhawan, New Delhi.

=== June 2019 ===
- 21 June – The government introduced a fresh The Muslim Women (Protection of Rights on Marriage) Bill, 2019 bill in the Lok Sabha on 21 June 2019.

=== July 2019 ===
- 25-30 July – The Muslim Women (Protection of Rights on Marriage) Bill, 2019 bill which will ban Triple talaq was passed by Lok Sabha on 25 July 2019 and then by Rajya Sabha on 30 July 2019, and received the presidential assent soon thereafter. The bill stands to be retrospectively effective from 19 September 2018.

=== August 2019 ===
- 5 August – Home Minister Amit Shah moved a presidential resolution to scrap Article 370 in the Rajya Sabha, and also a bill to reorganize the state, creating the new union territories of Jammu and Kashmir and Ladakh. The Jammu and Kashmir reorganisation act became effective from 31 October 2019.

=== November 2019 ===
- 9 November – India's Supreme Court rules to hand over the disputed site (2.77 acres) to a government-created trust to build the Ram Janmabhoomi temple, it also ruled to the government to provide an alternate 5 acres of land to the Sunni Waqf Board to build a mosque.

=== December 2019 ===
- 11 December – Rajya Sabha passes the Citizenship Amendment Bill, providing a path to Indian citizenship for refugees from Pakistan, Bangladesh and Afghanistan who are the religious minorities (Hindus, Sikhs, Buddhists, Jains, Parsis and Christians) in the three countries and who came to India before 31 December 2014. The law also reduced the naturalization period for the listed religious minorities from these countries from 11 years to 5 years.

== 2020 ==
=== March 2020 ===
- 19 March – Modi announced a 14-hour curfew on 22 March from 7 AM to 9 PM in view of the COVID-19 pandemic.
- 24 March – Modi announced a nationwide lockdown in India for 21 days to prevent the spread of the COVID-19 pandemic.

=== May 2020 ===
- 12 May – Prime Minister announced an economic stimulus package of 20 trillion rupees, which is equivalent to 10% of India's gross domestic product, during the COVID-19 pandemic.
- 15 May – Prime Minister gave the clarification and motto of Atmanirbhar Bharat to strong economy of the nation.
- 22 May – Prime Minister made project to counter the Amphan cyclone in West Bengal and Orissa and also visited the affected areas.

=== June 2020 ===
- 16 June – Modi held virtual meeting with Chief ministers of all states regarding the Unlock-1 in India.
- 17 June – Modi addresses the nation in view of the Galwan Valley clash.
- 18 June – Modi launches auction process of 41 coal blocks for commercial mining.
- 19 June – Modi held meeting regarding India-China border dispute.

=== July 2020 ===
- 3 July – Prime Minister visits to Nimu, Ladakh to see border situation.
- 17 July - Modi delivers keynote address at United Nations Economic and Social Council session.
- 22 July - Modi attends the India Ideas Summit.
- 23 July - Modi lays foundation stone for Manipur Water Supply Project via video conferencing.
- 27 July - Modi launches High Throughput COVID testing facilities at Kolkata, Mumbai and Noida.
- 30 July – Prime Minister along with Mauritius prime minister, Pravind Jugnauth inaugurates new parliament building of Mauritius.

=== August 2020 ===
- 1 August – Modi addresses Grand Finale of Smart India Hackathon 2020.
- 14 August – Modi becomes the longest-serving non-Congress Prime Minister.
- 5 August – Modi prays at Hanuman Garhi Temple in Ayodhya, and then held the bhoomipoojan in Ram Mandir in Ayodhya.

=== September 2020 ===
- 20 September – The Rajya Sabha approved three farm reform bills.
- 27 September – The President of India, Ram Nath Kovind gave his assent on the approved three farm reform bills.

=== October 2020 ===
- 3 October - Modi inaugurates Atal Tunnel.

=== December 2020 ===
- 12 December - Modi delivers inaugural address at FICCI's 93rd Annual General Meeting.
- 15 December - Modi lays foundation stone of multiple development initiatives in Kutch.
- 17 December - Modi, Bangladesh PM hold virtual bilateral meeting.
- 18 December - Modi addresses Kisan Sammelan held in Madhya Pradesh.
- 21 December - Modi holds Virtual Summit with PM Nguyen Xuan Phuc of Vietnam.
- 22 December - Modi awarded the Legion of Merit by the United States of America. Modi addresses Centenary Celebrations of Aligarh Muslim University.
- 24 December - Modi addresses centenary celebrations of Visva Bharati University, Shantiniketan.
- 25 December - Modi releases installment of financial benefit under PM Kisan Samman Nidhi.
- 28 December - Modi flags off 100th Kisan Rail from Maharashtra to West Bengal.
- 29 December - Modi inaugurates New Bhaupur-New Khurja section of Eastern Dedicated Freight Corridor.
- 31 December - Modi lays Foundation Stone of AIIMS at Rajkot.

== 2021 ==
=== January 2021 ===
- 1 January - Modi lays foundation stone of Light House projects (LHPs) across six states.
- 2 January - Modi lays foundation stone of the permanent campus of IIM Sambalpur in Odisha.

=== February 2021 ===
- 14 February - Modi launched five developmental projects in Kerala, projects worth crores in Tamil Nadu.
- 18 February - Modi inaugurates road projects worth Rs 7,700 crore in Assam.

=== March 2021 ===
- 9 March - PM virtually inaugurated the India-Bangladesh Friendship Bridge (Maitri Setu).
- 9 March - Modi lays the foundation stone for 8 infrastructure projects together worth ₹ 3,518 crore.
- 15 March - Modi held a video-conference meeting of all chief ministers in response to the recent spike of COVID-19 cases across India.

=== April 2021 ===
- 7 April - Modi held his annual interaction with students Pariksha Pe Charcha.
- 11 April - Modi launches Tika Utsav (Vaccine Festival) emphasizing on testing and awareness and urged every eligible person to get vaccinated.

== 2022 ==
=== May 2022 ===
- 2 May - Official visit to Germany.
- 3 May - Working visit to Denmark.
- 4 May - Trip to France.
- 16 May - Fifth trip to Nepal.
- 23 May - Trip to Japan.

=== June 2022 ===
- 26 June - Trip to Germany.
- 28 June - Trip to UAE.

=== September 2022 ===
- 15 September - Trip to Uzbekistan.
- 27 September - Trip to Japan.

=== November 2022 ===
- 15 November - Trip to Indonesia for G-20 summit.

== 2023 ==
=== April 2023 ===
- 30 April - 100th episode of Mann Ki Baat is aired.

=== May 2023 ===
- 19 May - Modi visits Japan.
- 21 May - Modi visits Papua New Guinea.
- 22 May - Modi visits Australia.
- 28 May - New parliament building of was inaugurated by Modi.

=== June 2023 ===
- 20 June - Modi is on a state visit to the United Nations at United States of America.
- 25 June - Modi visits Egypt.

=== July 2023 ===
- 13 July - PM is on an official visit to France.
- 15 July - PM visits UAE.
- 20 July - Modi breaks his long silence on the 2023 Manipur gang rape viral video in his address outside the Parliament of India.

=== August 2023 ===
- 10 August - The Modi government defeats a no confidence vote moved by the opposition INDIA Alliance in response to the Manipur violence.
- 25 August - Trip to Greece.

=== September 2023 ===
- 5 September - Trip to Indonesia.
- 9-10 September - The eighteenth meeting of G20 (Group of Twenty) was held in Bharat Mandapam, Delhi on 9–10 September 2023. It was the first G20 summit held in India.
- 19 September - The New Parliament House was first used for official business on this during a Parliamentary Special Session. On the same day, Women's Reservation Bill, 2023 was introduced in Lok Sabha during the special session of Parliament. This legislation seeks to allocate 33 percent of the seats in the directly elected Lok Sabha, State legislative assemblies and Delhi legislative assembly for women.

=== November 2023 ===
- 30 November - Trip to UAE.

== 2024 ==
=== January 2024 ===
- 22 January - Modi addresses the opening ceremony of Ram Temple of Ayodhya.

=== February 2024 ===
- 13 February – Modi visits UAE.
- 14 February – Modi visits Qatar.
- 25 February - Modi inaugurates Sudarshan Setu bridge.
- 29 February - Modi in Mauritius.

=== March 24 ===
- 9 March - Modi inaugurates Sela Tunnel.
- 23 March – Modi visits Bhutan.

=== April 2024 ===
- 1 April – Modi addresses the RBI@90 ceremony, commemorating the 90 years journey of the Reserve Bank of India.

=== June 2024 ===
- 4 June – In the 2024 Indian general election, Modi won the Varanasi seat for the consecutive third time, this time with a victory margin of 1,52,513 votes. The Bharatiya Janata Party-led National Democratic Alliance formed the government at the centre, getting 293 out of 543 seats, which was quite a major drop in seats as compared to the 2019 elections.
- 9 June – Sworn in for the third time as the 16th Prime Minister of India at the Rashtrapati Bhawan, New Delhi.

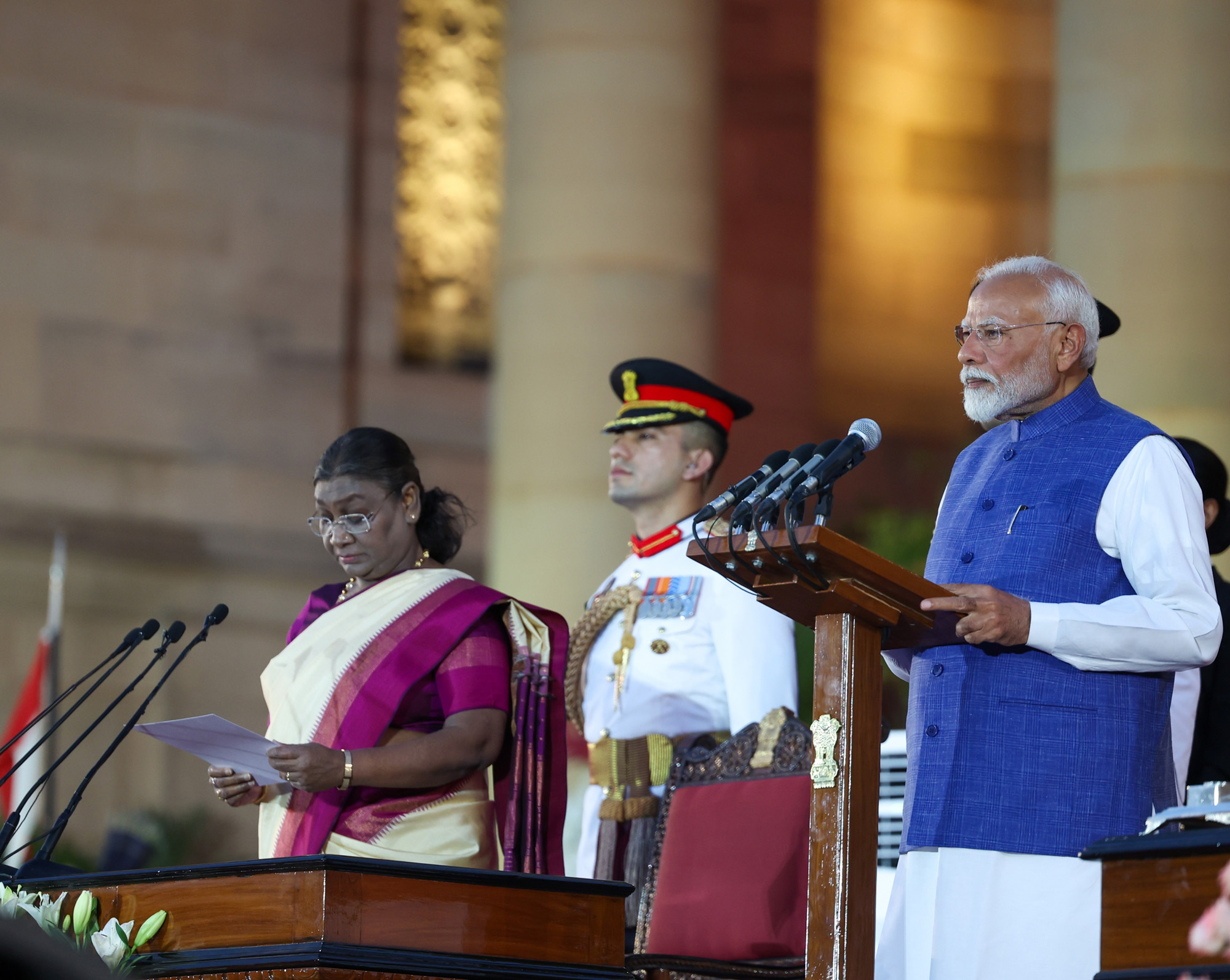
Prime Minister of India, with President Droupadi Murmu administering the oath.

- 14-15 June – Modi visited Italy for the 50th G7 summit representing India on invitation by the Italian delegation, the hosts of the event. He also met several Heads of the Nations and has discussed the bilateral relations between India and the respective countries.

=== July 2024 ===
- 8-9 July – Modi pad an official visit to the Russian Federation on invitation of the Russian President Vladimir Putin to hold the 22nd India-Russia Annual Summit.

=== August 2024 ===
- 15 August - Modi delivered his 11th and longest Independence Day speech at Red Fort of 98 minutes.
- 21-22 August - Modi visited Poland. It marked 45 years since any Indian Prime Minister visited Poland. It draw four-year action plan for the strategic partnership that encompasses security cooperation, trade, technology, connectivity, counter-terrorism, cyber-security and health, the two sides decided to finalise a social security agreement to protect the interests of professionals working in each other's countries and to promote mobility.
- 22 August - Modi visited Ukraine. It was first time since any Indian Prime Minister visited Ukraine. India and Ukraine signed four agreements to provide for cooperation in agriculture, medicine, culture, humanitarian assistance. In a gesture of solidarity, India handed over medical support equipment to Ukraine, amounting to a total weight of 22 tonnes. Modi also called for a "path to peace through dialogue." on ongoing Russo-Ukrainian War, he added India was never a neutral, it stands with peace.
- 30 August - Modi laid the foundation stone of Vadhavan Port, which is planned to be one of the largest deep-water ports in India. The port will be in Palghar, Maharashtra and has an estimated cost of ₹76,000 crore (US$7.9 billion). Modi addressed the Global Fintech Fest, 2024 in Mumbai.

=== September 2024 ===
- 3 September - Modi visited Brunei, This visit marked the first time when any Indian Prime minister visited Brunei.
- 4-5 September - Modi visited Singapore. This visit will build synergies in semiconductor ecosystems of Singapore and India.
- 11 September - Modi haired the first meeting of the Governing Board of Anusandhan National Research Foundation This body will continue working towards ensuring a transformation of India's research landscape, thus breaking new ground in the world of science.
- 21-23 September - PM Modi attended the QUAD Summit of 2024, an event of Indian diaspora in New York. He hosted the Roundtable of CEOs of several American companies such as Google's Sundar Pichai, Adobe's Shantanu Narayena, Accenture's Julie Sweet and NVIDIA's Jensen Huang, AMD's Lisa Su, HP Inc.'s Enrique Lores, IBM's Arvind Krishna, Dr Noubar Afeyan, Chairman of Moderna, and Verizon's Hans Vestberg. President Joe Biden also hosted Modi for a bilateral meeting in his home. He welcomed the progress made towards India sealing procurement of 31 long-endurance MQ-9B armed drones from American defence major General Atomics. Modi also addressed the 'Summit of the Future' at the UN General Assembly during the trip.

=== October 2024 ===
- 10-11 October - PM Modi attended the nineteenth East Asia Summit in Vientiane, Laos. Modi also held bilateral talks with the prime minister of Laos Sonexay Siphandone.
- 22-24 October - PM Modi visited Kazan, Russia for the sixteenth BRICS summit. Modi also held bilateral talks with General Secretary of the Chinese Communist Party Xi Jinping and Russian President Vladimir Putin. India and China struck an agreement ending the 4 years long border standoff in the backdrop of this summit.
- 25 October - PM Modi met German Chancellor Olaf Scholz at Hyderabad House in New Delhi.
- 28 October - PM Modi met President of the Government of Spain, Pedro Sanchez at Lakshmi Vilas Palace in Vadodra.
- 31 October - PM Modi celebrated Diwali with the soldiers posted in Kutch. This was his 11th Diwali celebrations with soldiers.

=== November 2024 ===
- 16-17 November - PM Modi visited Abuja as a state visit and held bilateral talks with President Tinubu. Modi was conferred with the national award, “Grand Commander of the Order of Niger” by President Tinubu.
- 18-19 November - PM Modi attended the nineteenth G20 summit held in Rio de Janeiro. This was the first G20 summit since New Delhi hosted the G20 Summit last year. He held multiple bilateral and multilateral meetings in the backdrop of this summit.
- 19-21 November - PM Modi visited Guyana, making this the first state visit by an Indian head of state in over 56 years. The President of Guyana conferred upon Modi the highest national award of Guyana, "The Order of Excellence". Modi also took part in multiple cultural and community programs, including meeting many local cricketers. Modi was also present in the 2nd India-CARICOM summit, where he held bilateral meetings with many heads of Caribbean nations.
- 25 November - Modi addressed the media at the beginning of Parliament's winter session.

=== December 2024 ===
- 5 December - Modi received Bhutan King Jigme K. Namgyel Wangchuck at 7, Race Course Road in New Delhi.
- 13 December - Modi inaugurated and launched multiple projects developmental projects worth Rs 5500 crore in Prayagraj. He also inspected the preparations for the 2025 Mahakumbh being held in Prayagraj. The 2025 Mahakumbh is on the occasion of a rare celestial event that occurs once in 144 years.
- 16 December - Modi and Sri Lankan President Anura Kumara Dissanayake held their first bilateral meeting in New Delhi following the latter's election.
- 21-22 December - Modi visited Kuwait, becoming first prime minister in 43 years to visit Kuwait. Modi took part in community programs hailing the large Indian diaspora in Kuwait. Modi was conferred the Order of Mubarak the Great by the Emir of Kuwait.

== 2025 ==
=== January 2025 ===
- 9 January - Modi inaugurated the 18th Pravasi Bharatiya Divas convention in Odisha.
- 13 January - Modi inaugurated the Sonamarg Tunnel in Sonamarg, Jammu and Kashmir.
- 14 January - Modi attended and addressed a program celebrating the 150th anniversary of the India Meteorological Department in Bharat Mandapam.
- 15 January - PM Modi commissioned a destroyer, a frigate and a submarine, INS Surat, INS Nilgiri and INS Vaghsheer respectively, in a ceremony at Mumbai Naval Dockyard.
- 16 January - PM Modi met with the President of Singapore Tharman Shanmugaratnam in New Delhi.
- 25 January - PM Modi hosted the President of Indonesia Prabowo Subianto at Hyderabad House in New Delhi.
- 31 January - PM Modi addressed the media at the start of budget session of the parliament. The union budget was presented by Finance Minister Nirmala Sitharaman, the day later.

=== February 2025 ===
- 10-12 February - PM Modi paid a state visit to France, during which he co-chaired AI-Action Summit in Paris along with French President Emmanuel Macron. Both leaders later traveled to Marseille and inaugurated a new Indian consulate. They later visited ITER in Saint-Paul-lès-Durance.
- 12-14 February - PM Modi paid a state visit to the US, where he held talks with the newly elected US President Donald Trump at the White House. He also held diplomatic talks with the American NSA and other prominent American officials.

=== March 2025 ===
- 11-12 March - PM Modi was invited to Mauritius by the Prime Minister of Mauritius to attend the Mauritius National Day celebrations as the Chief Guest. He was also conferred Mauritius's highest civilian award, the Grand Commander of the Order of the Star and Key of the Indian Ocean, by President of Mauritius Dharam Gokhool.

=== April 2025 ===
- 1 April - PM Modi met with the President of Chile Gabriel Boric Font at the Hyderabad House in New Delhi. There were multiple agreements made. This meeting was seen to be significant in conjecture to the large reserves of lithium, an alkali metal, present in Chile.
- 3-4 April - PM Modi visited Bangkok, Thailand for the 6th BIMSTEC Summit, where he held bilateral meetings with the Prime Minister of Thailand Paetongtarn Shinawatra, the Chief of Myanmar Junta Min Aung Hlaing and the Chief Advisor of Bangladesh Muhammad Yunus for the first time since regime change in Bangladesh. PM Modi also paid a visit to the Thai Royal Family. Later, PM Modi was accompanied by the Thai PM Paetongtarn Shinawatra to the Wat Pho Temple in Bangkok .
- 4-6 April - PM Modi paid a state visit to Sri Lanka, where he met with the Sri Lankan President Anura Kumara Dissanayake. Both the leaders held bilateral discussions on many important topics. PM Modi was conferred with the Sri Lanka Mitra Vibhushana, Sri Lanka's highest civilian award. Later, PM Modi paid tribute at Sri Lanka's sacred Jaya Sri Maha Bodhi Temple.
- 22 April - PM Modi departed for Jeddah, Saudi Arabia to attend the second meeting of the Strategic Partnership Council. Upon his arrival in Jeddah, he was informed of a terrorist attack at a tourist spot in Pahalgam. In response, he decided to cut short his visit and immediately returned to India. The terror attack
- 23 April - PM Modi chaired a meeting of the Cabinet Committee on Security (CCS) at his residence at 7, Race Course Road in response to the Pakistan-backed terrorist attack at Pahalgam. The CCS declared the suspension of the Indus Water Treaty and the termination of all Indian visas issued to Pakistani nationals.
- 27 April - PM Modi in his monthly radio address to the nation, Mann Ki Baat, criticised terror and terror sympathisers and vowed a strong and just revenge.

=== May 2025 ===
- 7 May - India launched Operation Sindoor with missile strikes on terrorism-related infrastructure facilities of Pakistan-based militant groups Jaish-e-Mohammed and Lashkar-e-Taiba in Pakistan and Pakistan-administered Azad Kashmir, and said that no Pakistani military or civilian facilities were targeted. PM Modi canceled his three-nation visit, originally scheduled between May 13 and May 17.
- 7-10 May - India and Pakistan had a brief armed conflict, where Pakistan called India to have a ceasefire. And thus the ceasefire was agreed.
- 12 May - PM Modi addressed the nation for the first time post Operation Sindoor and India-Pakistan conflict.
- 13 May - PM Modi visited AFS Adampur and took a series of photographs, one of which featured the S-400 system in the background, thus disproving claims made by the Pakistani military and media outlets about its destruction in Adampur.

=== June 2025 ===
- 4 June - PM Modi chaired a meeting of Council of Ministers.

=== August 2025 ===
- 31 August - 1 September - PM Modi visited Tianjin, China for 2025 Tianjin SCO summit. Modi also held bilateral talks with General Secretary of the Chinese Communist Party Xi Jinping and President of Russia Vladimir Putin.

=== September 2025 ===
- 13 September - Modi visited Manipur for the first time to inaugurate development projects worth 7300 crore since ethnic violence erupted in the state in May 2023.

== 2026 ==
=== January 2026 ===
- 12 January - Prime Minister Modi welcomed Chancellor Merz in Ahmedabad. The two Leaders paid floral tribute at the statue of Mahatma Gandhi at Sabarmati Ashram, and participated in the famous Kite Festival. The two Leaders also addressed India-Germany CEOs Forum.

=== March 2026 ===
- 30 March - In the Naxalite–Maoist insurgency, the Indian government declares victory, citing a sharp decline in violence. However, this was disputed by at least two Maoist commanders.

=== July 2026 ===
- 25 July - Following protests against the Modi government's handling of the 2026 NEET paper leak, Dharmendra Pradhan resigns as the Minister of Education from the cabinet .

== See also ==
- Premiership of Narendra Modi
- List of international prime ministerial trips made by Narendra Modi
- List of awards and honours received by Narendra Modi
