= Modis =

Modis may refer to:

== People ==
- Georgios Modis (Greek: Γεώργιος Μόδης; 1887–1975) Greek jurist and politician
- Theodoros Modis (Greek: Θεόδωρος Μόδης; died 1904) Macedonian merchant and politician
- Theodore Modis (born 1945) Greek-Swiss business analyst
- Yorgo Modis (born 1974) Swiss medical researcher

== Other uses ==
- Moderate Resolution Imaging Spectroradiometer (MODIS)
- Modis, an IT solutions subsidiary of HR firm The Adecco Group
- Modis Tower, Wells Fargo Center, Jacksonville, Florida, USA

== See also ==
- Modist
- Modi (disambiguation)
- Modia (disambiguation)
- Modius (disambiguation)
