= Modius =

Modius (plural modii) may refer to:

- an ancient Roman unit for dry measures, (8.73 L) roughly equivalent to a peck
- a medieval Roman unit for area, approximately 40 acres
- Modius (headdress), a type of cylindrical headdress so called for its resemblance to the measure of grain
- Modius, the family name of the Modia (gens)
- Modius (beetle), a genus in the family Eucnemidae

== See also ==
- Modi (disambiguation)
- Modia (disambiguation)
- Modis (disambiguation)
