= Oath of office ceremony of Narendra Modi =

Narendra Modi has taken oath as the Prime Minister of India three times:

- First oath of office ceremony of Narendra Modi (2014)
- Second oath of office ceremony of Narendra Modi (2019)
- Third oath of office ceremony of Narendra Modi (2024)

== See also ==
- Modi (disambiguation)
- Modi ministry (disambiguation)
