= Union Council of Ministers =

Principal executive body of India

- State Emblem of India

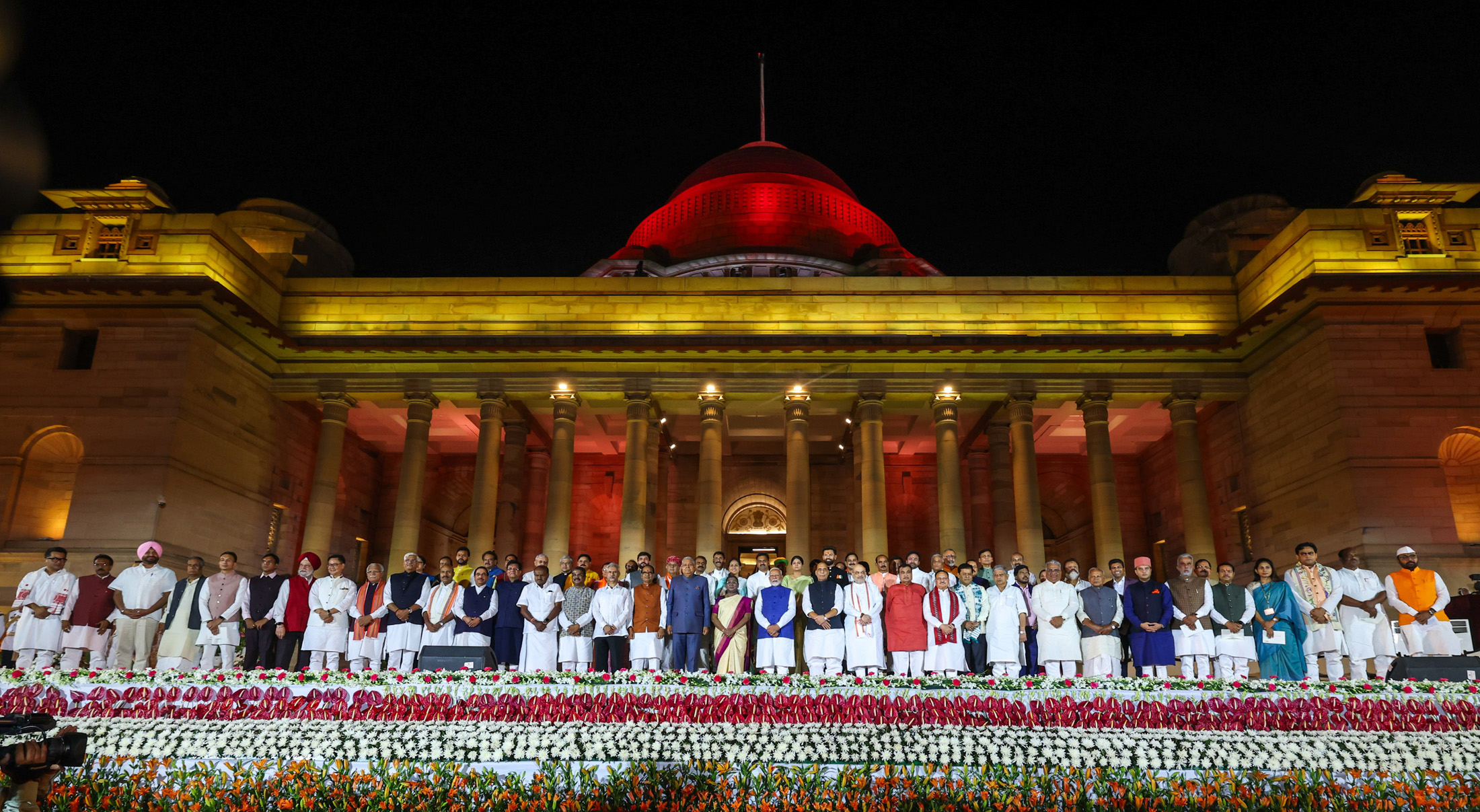
- The incumbent Union Council of Ministers of the Third Modi ministry, 2024 at their swearing in

Agency overview
- Formed: 15 August 1947; 79 years ago
- Type: Highest executive body of the Government of India
- Jurisdiction: Republic of India
- Headquarters: New Delhi
- Agency executives: Narendra Modi, Chair; Vacant, Deputy Chair
- Child agencies: Cabinet; Ministries of the Government of India
- Website: cabsec.gov.in

The Union Council of Ministers is the principal executive organ of the Government of India, which serves to aid and advise the president of India in execution of their functions. It is chaired by the prime minister of India and consists of the heads of each of the executive government ministries. Currently, the council is headed by Narendra Modi and consists of 71 fellow members. The council is collectively answerable to the Lok Sabha.

A smaller executive body called the Union Cabinet is the supreme decision-making body in India; it is a subset of the Union Council of Ministers who hold important portfolios and ministries of the government.

== Regulation ==
Pursuant to Article 75(3), the Council of Ministers is responsible collectively to the lower house of the Indian parliament, called the Lok Sabha (House of the People). The council of ministers upon losing the confidence of Lok Sabha shall resign to facilitate the formation of a new council.

A minister can take any decision without being considered by the council of ministers per Article 78(c). If needed, all union cabinet members shall submit in writing to the President to propose a proclamation of emergency by the president in accordance with Article 352.

According to the Constitution of India, the total number of ministers in the council of ministers must not exceed 15% of the total number of members of the Lok Sabha. Ministers must be members of parliament. (Note: It is not mentioned anywhere that they must be 'elected' members of parliament.) Any minister who is not a member of either of the houses of the parliament for six consecutive months is automatically stripped off his or her ministerial post. (Note: The newly appointed ministers are expected to attain qualifications of being a member of parliament as specified by Constitution of India (article 84) within a period of six months from the date of their appointment as a minister.)

== Ranking ==
There are five categories of the council of ministers as given below, in descending order of rank:

- Prime Minister: Leader of the Union Council of Ministers.
- Deputy Prime Minister (if any): Presides as prime minister in his absence or as the senior most cabinet minister.
- Cabinet Minister: A member of the Union cabinet; leads a ministry.
- Minister of State (Independent charge): Junior minister not reporting to a Cabinet Minister.
- Minister of State (MoS): Deputy Minister reporting to a Cabinet Minister, usually tasked with a specific responsibility in that ministry.

== Appointment ==
Pursuant to Article 75, a minister is appointed by the President on the advice of the Prime Minister and functions until the pleasure of the President of India. Since at least the turn of the millennia, evidence indicates that an MP's electoral performance enhances the likelihood of being granted a ministerial portfolio.

== Removal ==
- Upon death
- Upon self resignation, or resignation or death of the prime minister
- Upon dismissal by the President for minister's unconstitutional acts per Article 75(2)
- Upon direction from the Judiciary for committing violation of law
- Upon ceasing eligibility to be a member of Parliament
- Under the provision of "Collective Responsibility" under Article 75, the Prime Minister and the entire Council of Ministers resign if they lose majority by a Vote of No Confidence in the Lower House (Lok Sabha) of the Parliament

== Council of Ministers in state governments ==
Every state in India is governed by its council of ministers with rules and procedures similar to the union council of ministers per Articles 163, 164 and 167(c).

In March 2020, the Supreme Court of India used its powers for the first time to do "complete justice" under Article 142 of the Indian Constitution to remove a minister functioning in the state of Manipur.

== Oath of office ==
The oath of office for Union Council of Ministers:

The oath of office is as follows:

I, (name), do swear in the name of God (or, solemnly affirm) that I will bear true faith and allegiance to the Constitution of India as by law established, that I will uphold the sovereignty and integrity of India, that I will faithfully and conscientiously discharge my duties as a Minister for the Union and that I will do right to all manner of people in accordance with the Constitution and the law, without fear or favour, affection or ill-will.

— Schedule III, Constitution of India

oath of office of Union Council of Ministers In Hindi Version

'मैं, (अमुक), ईश्वर की शपथ लेता हूँ (सत्यनिष्ठा से प्रतिज्ञान करता हूँ) कि मैं विधि द्वारा स्थापित भारत के संविधान के प्रति सच्ची श्रद्धा और निष्ठा रखूँगा, मैं भारत की प्रभुता और अखंडता अक्षुण्ण रखूँगा, मैं संघ के मंत्री के रूप में अपने कर्तव्यों का श्रद्धापूर्वक और शुद्ध अंतःकरण से निर्वहन करूँगा तथा मैं भय या पक्षपात, अनुराग या द्वेष के बिना, सभी प्रकार के लोगों के प्रति संविधान और विधि के अनुसार न्याय करूँगा।'

— तीसरी अनुसूची, भारत का संविधान

The oath of secrecy is as follows:

I, (name), do swear in the name of God (or, solemnly affirm) that I will not directly or indirectly communicate or reveal to any person or persons any matter which shall be brought under my consideration, or shall become known to me as a Minister for the Union, except as may be required for the due discharge of my duties as Minister.

— Schedule III, Constitution of India

Oath of Secrecy in Hindi Version

'मैं, (अमुक), ईश्वर की शपथ लेता हूँ (सत्यनिष्ठा से प्रतिज्ञान करता हूँ) कि जो विषय संघ के प्रधानमंत्री (या, मंत्री) के रूप में मेरे विचार के लिए लाया जाएगा अथवा मुझे ज्ञात होगा उसे किसी व्यक्ति या व्यक्तियों को, तब के सिवाय जबकि मंत्री के रूप में अपने कर्तव्यों के सम्यक्‌ निर्वहन के लिए ऐसा करना अपेक्षित हो, मैं प्रत्यक्ष अथवा अप्रत्यक्ष रूप से संसूचित या प्रकट नहीं करूँगा।'

— तीसरी अनुसूची, भारत का संविधान

=== Cabinet Ministers ===
Portfolio	Minister	Took office	Left office	Party	Remarks
Prime Minister; Minister of Personnel, Public Grievances and Pensions; Department of Atomic Energy; Department of Space; All important policy issues; and All other portfolios not allocated to any Minister.	Narendra Modi	9 June 2024	Incumbent	BJP	
Minister of Defence	Rajnath Singh	10 June 2024	Incumbent	BJP	
Minister of Home Affairs; Minister of Co-operation	Amit Shah	10 June 2024	Incumbent	BJP	
Minister of Road Transport and Highways	Nitin Gadkari	10 June 2024	Incumbent	BJP	
Minister of Health and Family Welfare; Minister of Chemicals and Fertilizers	Jagat Prakash Nadda	10 June 2024	Incumbent	BJP	
Minister of Agriculture and Farmers Welfare; Minister of Rural Development	Shivraj Singh Chouhan	10 June 2024	Incumbent	BJP	
Minister of Finance; Minister of Corporate Affairs	Nirmala Sitharaman	9 June 2024	Incumbent	BJP	
Minister of External Affairs	S. Jaishankar	10 June 2024	Incumbent	BJP	
Minister of Power; Minister of Housing and Urban Affairs	Manohar Lal Khattar	9 June 2024	Incumbent	BJP	
Minister of Heavy Industries; Minister of Steel	H. D. Kumaraswamy	10 June 2024	Incumbent	JD(S)	
Minister of Commerce and Industry	Piyush Goyal	10 June 2024	Incumbent	BJP	
Minister of Micro, Small and Medium Enterprises	Jitan Ram Manjhi	10 June 2024	Incumbent	HAM(S)	
Minister of Panchayati Raj	Lalan Singh	10 June 2024	Incumbent	JD(U)	
Minister of Ports, Shipping and Waterways	Sarbananda Sonowal	10 June 2024	Incumbent	BJP	
Minister of Social Justice and Empowerment	Virendra Kumar Khatik	10 June 2024	Incumbent	BJP	
Minister of Civil Aviation	Kinjarapu Ram Mohan Naidu	10 June 2024	Incumbent	TDP	
Minister of Consumer Affairs, Food and Public Distribution; Minister of New and Renewable Energy; Ministry of Education	Prahlad Joshi	10 June 2024	Incumbent	BJP	
Minister of Tribal Affairs	Jual Oram	10 June 2024	Incumbent	BJP	
Minister of Textiles	Giriraj Singh	10 June 2024	Incumbent	BJP	
Minister of Information and Broadcasting; Minister of Railways; Minister of Electronics and Information Technology	Ashwini Vaishnaw	10 June 2024	Incumbent	BJP	
Minister of Development of North Eastern Region; Minister of Communications	Jyotiraditya Scindia	10 June 2024	Incumbent	BJP	
Minister of Environment, Forest and Climate Change	Bhupender Yadav	10 June 2024	Incumbent	BJP	
Minister of Culture; Minister of Tourism	Gajendra Singh Shekhawat	10 June 2024	Incumbent	BJP	
Minister of Women and Child Development	Annpurna Devi	10 June 2024	Incumbent	BJP	
Minister of Parliamentary Affairs; Minister of Minority Affairs	Kiren Rijiju	10 June 2024	Incumbent	BJP	
Minister of Petroleum and Natural Gas	Hardeep Singh Puri	10 June 2024	Incumbent	BJP	
Minister of Labour and Employment; Minister of Youth Affairs and Sports	Mansukh L. Mandaviya	10 June 2024	Incumbent	BJP	
Minister of Coal; Minister of Mines	G. Kishan Reddy	10 June 2024	Incumbent	BJP	
Minister of Food Processing Industries	Chirag Paswan	10 June 2024	Incumbent	LJP(RV)	
Minister of Jal Shakti	C. R. Patil	10 June 2024	Incumbent	BJP	

=== Ministers of State (Independent Charge) ===
Portfolio	Minister	Took office	Left office	Party	Remarks
Minister of State (Independent Charge) of Statistics and Programme Implementation; Minister of State (Independent Charge) of Planning	Rao Inderjit Singh	10 June 2024	Incumbent	BJP	
Minister of State (Independent Charge) of Science and Technology; Minister of State (Independent Charge) of Earth Sciences	Jitendra Singh	10 June 2024	Incumbent	BJP	
Minister of State (Independent Charge) of the Ministry of Law and Justice	Arjun Ram Meghwal	10 June 2024	Incumbent	BJP	
Minister of State (Independent Charge) of the Ministry of Ayush	Prataprao Ganpatrao Jadhav	10 June 2024	Incumbent	Shiv Sena (2022-present)	
Minister of State (Independent Charge) of the Ministry of Skill Development and Entrepreneurship	Jayant Chaudhary	10 June 2024	Incumbent	RLD	

=== Ministers of State (MoS) ===
Rao Inderjit Singh|minister1_party=Bharatiya Janata Party|minister1_termstart=10 June 2024|minister1_termend=|minister1_ref= }}

Portfolio	Minister	Took office	Left office	Party	Remarks
Minister of State in the Ministry of Culture	Rao Inderjit Singh	10 June 2024	Incumbent	BJP	
Minister of State in the Prime Minister’s Office; Minister of State in the Ministry of Personnel, Public Grievances and Pensions; Minister of State in the Department of Atomic Energy; Minister of State in the Department of Space	Jitendra Singh	10 June 2024	Incumbent	BJP	
Minister of State in the Ministry of Parliamentary Affairs	Arjun Ram Meghwal	10 June 2024	Incumbent	BJP	
Minister of State in the Ministry of Parliamentary Affairs	L. Murugan	10 June 2024	Incumbent	BJP	
Minister of State in the Ministry of Health and Family Welfare	Prataprao Ganpatrao Jadhav	10 June 2024	Incumbent	Shiv Sena (2022-present)	
Minister of State in the Ministry of Health and Family Welfare	Anupriya Patel	10 June 2024	Incumbent	AD(S)	
Minister of State in the Ministry of Education	Jayant Chaudhary	10 June 2024	Incumbent	RLD	
Minister of State in the Ministry of Education	Sukanta Majumdar	10 June 2024	Incumbent	BJP	
Minister of State in the Ministry of Commerce and Industry; Minister of State in the Ministry of Electronics and Information Technology	Jitin Prasada	10 June 2024	Incumbent	BJP	
Minister of State in the Ministry of Power; Minister of State in the Ministry of New and Renewable Energy	Shripad Yesso Naik	10 June 2024	Incumbent	BJP	
Minister of State in the Ministry of Finance	Pankaj Chaudhary	10 June 2024	Incumbent	BJP	
Minister of State in the Ministry of Co-operation	Krishan Pal Gurjar	10 June 2024	Incumbent	BJP	
Minister of State in the Ministry of Co-operation	Murlidhar Mohol	10 June 2024	Incumbent	BJP	
Minister of State in the Ministry of Social Justice and Empowerment	Ramdas Athawale	10 June 2024	Incumbent	RPI(A)	
Minister of State in the Ministry of Social Justice and Empowerment	B. L. Verma	10 June 2024	Incumbent	BJP	
Minister of State in the Ministry of Agriculture and Farmers Welfare	Ram Nath Thakur	10 June 2024	Incumbent	JD(U)	
Minister of State in the Ministry of Agriculture and Farmers Welfare	Bhagirath Choudhary	10 June 2024	Incumbent	BJP	
Minister of State in the Ministry of Home Affairs	Nityanand Rai	10 June 2024	Incumbent	BJP	
Minister of State in the Ministry of Home Affairs	Bandi Sanjay Kumar	10 June 2024	Incumbent	BJP	
Minister of State in the Ministry of Chemicals and Fertilizers	Anupriya Patel	10 June 2024	Incumbent	AD(S)	
Minister of State in the Ministry of Jal Shakti	V. Somanna	10 June 2024	Incumbent	BJP	
Minister of State in the Ministry of Jal Shakti	Raj Bhushan Choudhary	10 June 2024	Incumbent	BJP	
Minister of State in the Ministry of Railways	V. Somanna	10 June 2024	Incumbent	BJP	
Minister of State in the Ministry of Railways	Ravneet Singh Bittu	10 June 2024	Incumbent	BJP	
Minister of State in the Ministry of Rural Development	Pemmasani Chandra Sekhar	10 June 2024	Incumbent	TDP	
Minister of State in the Ministry of Rural Development	Kamlesh Paswan	10 June 2024	Incumbent	BJP	
Minister of State in the Ministry of Communications	Pemmasani Chandra Sekhar	10 June 2024	Incumbent	TDP	
Minister of State in the Ministry of Fisheries, Animal Husbandry and Dairying	S. P. Singh Baghel	10 June 2024	Incumbent	BJP	
Minister of State in the Ministry of Fisheries, Animal Husbandry and Dairying	George Kurian	10 June 2024	Incumbent	BJP	
Minister of State in the Ministry of Panchayati Raj	S. P. Singh Baghel	10 June 2024	Incumbent	BJP	
Minister of State in the Ministry of Micro, Small and Medium Enterprises; Minister of State in the Ministry of Labour and Employment	Shobha Karandlaje	10 June 2024	Incumbent	BJP	
Minister of State in the Ministry of Environment, Forest and Climate Change	Kirti Vardhan Singh	10 June 2024	Incumbent	BJP	
Minister of State in the Ministry of External Affairs	Kirti Vardhan Singh	10 June 2024	Incumbent	BJP	
Minister of State in the Ministry of External Affairs	Pabitra Margherita	10 June 2024	Incumbent	BJP	
Minister of State in the Ministry of Consumer Affairs, Food and Public Distribution	B. L. Verma	10 June 2024	Incumbent	BJP	
Minister of State in the Ministry of Consumer Affairs, Food and Public Distribution	Nimuben Bambhaniya	10 June 2024	Incumbent	BJP	
Minister of State in the Ministry of Ports, Shipping and Waterways	Shantanu Thakur	10 June 2024	Incumbent	BJP	
Minister of State in the Ministry of Petroleum and Natural Gas; Minister of State in the Ministry of Tourism	Suresh Gopi	10 June 2024	Incumbent	BJP	
Minister of State in the Ministry of Information and Broadcasting	L. Murugan	10 June 2024	Incumbent	BJP	
Minister of State in the Ministry of Road Transport and Highways	Ajay Tamta	10 June 2024	Incumbent	BJP	
Minister of State in the Ministry of Road Transport and Highways	Harsh Malhotra	10 June 2024	Incumbent	BJP	
Minister of State in the Ministry of Coal; Minister of State in the Ministry of Mines	Satish Chandra Dubey	10 June 2024	Incumbent	BJP	
Minister of State in the Ministry of Defence	Sanjay Seth	10 June 2024	Incumbent	BJP	
Minister of State in the Ministry of Food Processing Industries	Ravneet Singh Bittu	10 June 2024	Incumbent	BJP	
Minister of State in the Ministry of Tribal Affairs	Durga Das Uikey	10 June 2024	Incumbent	BJP	
Minister of State in the Ministry of Youth Affairs and Sports	Raksha Khadse	10 June 2024	Incumbent	BJP	
Minister of State in the Ministry of Development of North Eastern Region	Sukanta Majumdar	10 June 2024	Incumbent	BJP	
Minister of State in the Ministry of Women and Child Development	Savitri Thakur	10 June 2024	Incumbent	BJP	
Minister of State in the Ministry of Housing and Urban Affairs	Tokhan Sahu	10 June 2024	Incumbent	BJP	
Minister of State in the Ministry of Heavy Industries; Minister of State in the Ministry of Steel	Bhupathi Raju Srinivasa Varma	10 June 2024	Incumbent	BJP	
Minister of State in the Ministry of Corporate Affairs	Harsh Malhotra	10 June 2024	Incumbent	BJP	
Minister of State in the Ministry of Civil Aviation	Murlidhar Mohol	10 June 2024	Incumbent	BJP	
Minister of State in the Ministry of Minority Affairs; Minister of State in the Ministry of Fisheries, Animal Husbandry and Dairying	George Kurian	10 June 2024	Incumbent	BJP	
Minister of State in the Ministry of Textiles	Pabitra Margherita	10 June 2024	Incumbent	BJP	

== See also ==
- List of longest-serving members of the Union Council of Ministers
- National Democratic Alliance
- Council of Ministers of Narendra Modi
- Union government ministries of India
