= Modi ministry =

Modi ministry may refer to:

- Gujarat Council of Ministers
  - First Modi ministry (Gujarat), the government of Gujarat headed by Narendra Modi from 2001 to 2002
  - Second Modi ministry (Gujarat), the government of Gujarat headed by Narendra Modi from 2002 to 2007
  - Third Modi ministry (Gujarat), the government of Gujarat headed by Narendra Modi from 2007 to 2012
  - Fourth Modi ministry (Gujarat), the government of Gujarat headed by Narendra Modi from 2012 to 2014
- Union Council of Ministers
  - First Modi ministry, the 22nd government of India headed by Narendra Modi from 2014 to 2019
  - Second Modi ministry, the 23rd government of India headed by Narendra Modi from 2019 to 2024
  - Third Modi ministry, the 24th government of India headed by Narendra Modi from 2024 to present

== See also ==
- Modi (disambiguation)
  - Narendra Modi, the prime minister of India since 2014
- Oath of office ceremony of Narendra Modi (disambiguation)
