= Yorgo Modis =

Professor of virology

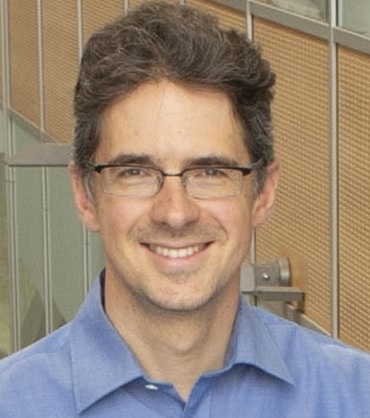
- Yorgo Modis in 2016
- Born: Yorgo Eugene Modis; 1974 (age 51–52); Geneva, Switzerland
- Education: International School of Geneva (IB); University of Cambridge (BA, MA); European Molecular Biology Laboratory, Heidelberg (PhD)
- Scientific career
- Fields: Biochemistry; Structural Biology
- Workplaces: European Molecular Biology Laboratory, Heidelberg; Harvard Medical School; Yale University; MRC Laboratory of Molecular Biology, University of Cambridge
- Academic advisors: Rik A. Wierenga; Stephen C. Harrison
- Website: www.mrc-lmb.cam.ac.uk/ymodis/

Yorgo E. Modis (born 1974) is Professor in Virology and Immunology, and a Wellcome Trust Senior Research Fellow at the Department of Medicine, University of Cambridge. He is head of The Modis Lab in the Molecular Immunity Unit at the MRC Laboratory of Molecular Biology. He studies cellular mechanisms of viral gene sensing and silencing. His group employs a diverse set of complementary biophysical approaches including cryo-electron microscopy (cryoEM), X-ray crystallography, solution biophysics, fluorescence microscopy and cell biological approaches to understand the cellular mechanisms of viral gene sensing and silencing in molecular-level detail.

== Education and early life ==
Modis received his International Baccalaureate from the International School of Geneva, Switzerland. He then studied Biochemistry at the University of Cambridge. He did his graduate work in Structural Biology with Rik A. Wierenga at the European Molecular Biology Laboratory Heidelberg obtaining his Ph.D. from the University of Leeds in 1999. For the next six years he worked as a Postdoctoral Fellow with Stephen C. Harrison at Harvard Medical School, Boston, U.S.A.

== Research and professional experience ==
While at Harvard (1999–2005) Modis co-authored five publications that featured on the cover of international scientific journals. Among them was the subject of viral entry into host cells by the dengue virus, which became a cover story on Nature (journal). The work gave rise to an award-winning animation Dengue Viral Fusion.
At Yale Modis was first Assistant Professor (2005–2010) and then Associate Professor (2010–2014) of Molecular Biophysics & Biochemistry. In those capacities he carried out research that led to numerous publications on which he was corresponding author and/or principal investigator.
In 2014 Modis accepted a position as Wellcome Trust Senior Research Fellow at University of Cambridge. He became the head of research group The Modis Lab at MRC Laboratory of Molecular Biology. Two years later he was named University Reader in Virology and Immunology. In 2021 he was named Professor in Virology and Immunology.
In these capacities Modis has co-authored a number of publications as principal investigator.
A full list of his publications (around 70) can be found here.
He has also been invited to, organized, or served as keynote speaker in over 100 seminars and conferences.
In May 2020 he helped Roger Highfield to set up a blog at the Science Museum Group with the theme Coronavirus: How the Virus Works.
In July 2020 he contributed graphics of the COVID-19 virus to the BBC News article by John Sudworth with title Wuhan: City of silence — Looking for answers in the place where coronavirus started.

== Honors and awards ==
2019 Senior Research Fellowship from the Wellcome Trust
2014 Senior Research Fellowship from the Wellcome Trust
2009 CINE Golden Eagle Award for the animation “Dengue Virus Visualization” on Teachers’ Domain 
2008 Nominated for the 2009 American Crystallography Association Margaret C. Etter Early Career Award (the award went to Dr. Svilen Bobev)
2007 Investigator in the Pathogenesis of Infectious Disease, Burroughs Wellcome Fund
2007 Anderson Endowed Bridge Fellowship Award, Yale University
2006 Anderson Endowed Fellowship Award, Yale University
2000-2004 Human Frontier Science Program Organization Long-Term Postdoctoral Fellowship
1999-2000 European Molecular Biology Organization Long-Term Fellowship
1999 Roche Foundation Postdoctoral Fellowship (declined)
1999 Swiss National Science Foundation Fellowship (declined)
1995-1999 Predoctoral Fellowship, European Molecular Biology Laboratory (4 years)
1995 Bateman Scholarship- First Class Honors Degree, Trinity Hall, University of Cambridge, U.K.
1995 Kareen Thorne Prize- Top First Class Honors Degree in Biological Sciences, Trinity Hall, University of Cambridge, U.K.
1995 First Class Honours (top grade) Bachelor of Arts degree in biochemistry, University of Cambridge, U.K.
1992 Top grade (7) in all six subjects of the International Baccalaureate at the International School of Geneva, Switzerland

== Personal life ==
Modis is the son of Theodore Modis and Carole Gene Modis. He is the great-grandson of Theodoros Modis and grandnephew of Georgios Modis.
