= Modia =

Modia may refer to:

- Modia (gens), a family name
- HaModia (Hebrew: המודיע, romanized: Ha Modia, lit. 'The Informer'), an Israeli newspaper
- Modia, a plural form of modius

== See also ==
- Modi (disambiguation)
- Media (disambiguation)
