= Modius Julius =

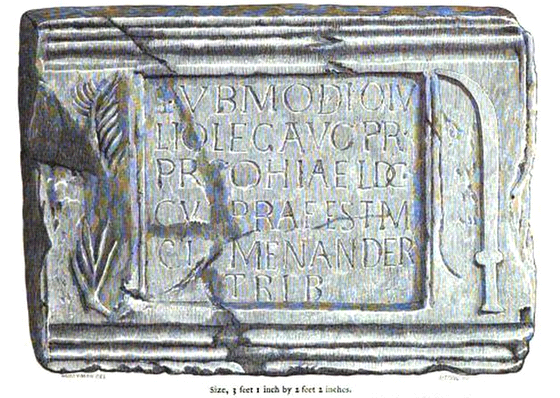
Stone from Birdoswald with inscription

Modius Julius was a governor of Britannia Inferior, a province of Roman Britain during AD 219 under Elagabalus. Inscriptions at Birdoswald (Banna) and the Castra Exploratorum at Netherby attest to his rule although little else is known of him.

== See also ==
- Modia (gens)
