= Mon Jaai =

- Film poster of Mon Jaai
- Directed by: Moirangthem Maniram
- Written by: Moirangthem Maniram
- Produced by: Moirangthem Maniram; Deepankar Dutta
- Starring: Zubeen Garg; Pabitra Margherita; Gyanendra Pallab; Nabadeep Borgohain; Nishita Goswami; Rimpi Das
- Cinematography: Suman Duwarah
- Edited by: Gautam Ghosh
- Music by: Zubeen Garg
- Distributed by: Moirangthem Movies
- Release date: 12 September 2008
- Running time: 178 minutes
- Country: India
- Language: Assamese

Mon Jaai (English: I feel like) is a 2008 Assamese language drama film directed by Moirangthem Maniram. The film is about the life of four unemployed educated youths from lower-middle-class families of Tinsukia, Assam who are entangled by their own misfortunes. The film is among 20 outstanding feature films of the country selected for Indian Panorama 2008 and shown in the 39th International Film Festival of India 2008 in Goa held from 22 November to 2 December.

== Plot ==
Manab (Zubeen Garg), Nayan (Pabitra Margherita), Tapan (Gyanendra Pallab) and Akan (Nabadeep Borgohain) are four unemployed educated youths from lower-middle-class families of Tinsukia. When his father dies, Nayan leaves home to work with an uncle in a distant township. One day the trio - Manab, Tapan and Akan are rounded up by police as terror suspects. Although they are bailed out three days later, that incident left them with a terror stamp that stands in their way of getting a clean job. This led them to indulge illegal activities. They hatch a plan for easy money and accordingly kidnap a businessman. But being amateurs, they end up killing the hostage. This create a huge furore but no one suspects the three youths because of their otherwise clean record and family background. The insurgent groups, however, deny their any involvement in the incident. With the passage of time the incidents is forgotten but the repentant trio, though, cannot escape pangs of conscience. One day, Manab's father chances upon Manab's share of the ransom money and learns about his son's involvement in the kidnap-death. This shocks him to such an extent that he disowns his only son and forbids him to even light his pyre. Once again their conscience is stricken. They know they can never forgive themselves. In the meantime Nayan, a well off, arrives from Guwahati and tell them not to indulge in any illegal activities. Nayan, with all his conviction and sincerity, becomes an Assam Civil Service officer and is serving as the Sub-Divisional Officer in Tinsukia.

Manab, unable to withstand the sight of his parents and sister leaves home. He travels till he reaches a monastery and devotes himself to service of the people. Tapan, being more aggressive, unwittingly gets involved with an anti-social racket and dies in a police encounter. Akan marries his girlfriend-Sewali and becomes the father of two kids He starts a business but it goes down and he loses his mental balance.

The film thus revolves around how they go about their lives in spite of their mistakes and highlights many issues plaguing Assam like corruption, terrorism, Bangladeshis etc.

== Characters ==
- Manab is the only son of a retired teacher with his sister and mother. His father is incapable of providing him anything other than arming him with a good moral character. He can think no wrong being grown up under his father's ideals. Due to lack of money, he misses on a lucrative job in police forces. Again he cannot think of business for the same. He loves a college girl Meghali, but because of his joblessness cannot muster courage to express his feelings to her.
- Nayan has a bedridden father and two elder sisters waiting to get married. He is the most sober and also a tee-to-teller among the four. He always gives his friends useful advice despite his own household problems. When his father dies, Nayan leaves home to work with an uncle in a distant township.
- Tapan lives with his two elder brothers and a sister-in-law in their ancestral house. He is always shabbily treated by his sister-in-law for his no contribution to the family and reminded that he is living off his brother's earnings. His middle elder brother Dhiraj demands his parental property which is readily denied by his sister-in-law. this led Dhiraj to plan killing their elder brother and asks Tapan to join him. Here Tapan is caught between. He jointly run a PCO with Akan but it earns just enough for the evening's buzz. He spends his time with his friends often sharing a round of drinks after dusk.
- Akan is a happy-go-lucky boy. He jointly runs a PCO with Tapan. He stays in a rented house which is often the place of drinking in the mornings, afternoons and evenings.

== Cast ==
- Zubeen Garg as Manab
- Pabitra Margherita as Nayan
- Gyanendra Pallab as Tapan
- Nabadeep Borgohain as Akan
- Nishita Goswami as Meghali, Manab's love interest.
- Mahika Sharma as special guest
- Jonali Devi as Sewali, Akan's girlfriend.
- Rimpi Das as Manab's sister
- Rina Bora as Manab's mother
- Maitreyee Priyadarshini as Nayan's sister

== Soundtrack ==
Mon Jaai

Soundtrack album by Zubeen Garg
- Released: 16 May 2008
- Recorded: 2007–2008
- Genre: Feature film soundtrack
- Producer: Zubeen Garg

Zubeen Garg chronology
Echoes of Silences (2007)	Mon Jaai (2008)	Kache Acho Tumi (2010)

Track List
No.	Title	Lyrics	Artist(s)	Length
1.	"Mon Jaai"	Diganta Bharati	Zubeen Garg	04:59
2.	"Dheere Dheere"	Diganta Bharati	Zubeen Garg	06:15
3.	"Anurag Etiya"	Diganta Bharati	Zubeen Garg	04:43
4.	"Hahi Heruwai"	Diganta Bharati	Diganta Bharati	05:20
5.	"Morom Dila Tumak"	Zubeen Garg	Simanta Shekhar
6.	"Bohag"	Diganta Bharati
7.	"Mon Jaai" (Extended Version)	Diganta Bharati	Zubeen Garg	12:19

== See also ==
- Jollywood Assamese
