= Moirangthem Maniram Singha =

Indian film director

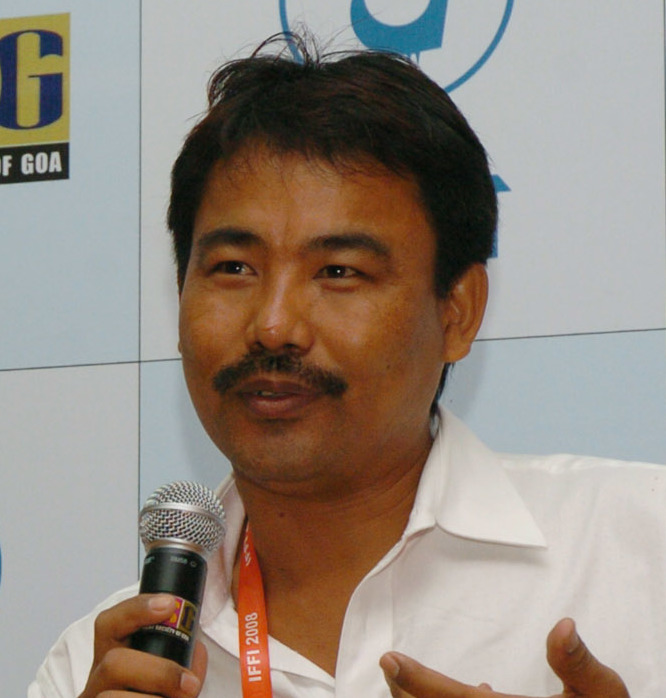
- Moirangthem Maniram in November 2008
- Born: 1970 (age 55–56); Mayang Langjing, Manipur
- Other name: M. Maniram
- Occupations: Film maker, Director, Producer, Scriptwriter
- Years active: 1995 - present

Moirangthem Maniram Singha (born 1970) is an Indian film maker, director, producer and scriptwriter of Assamese and Manipuri cinema. Born in Manipur, he is currently living in North Lakhimpur district of Assam.

== Family background ==
His father Bolbihari who hailed from a village called Phumlou, near Mayang Langjing in Manipur came to Assam at the age of 14. He enrolled himself in a training programme in tailoring trade from ITI, Jorhat. After the completion of the course, he set up a tailoring shop next to a cinema hall in Tinsukia.

== Early days ==
Maniram did his schooling from Doomdooma Don Bosco School, Tinsukia. He loved movies since his childhood. As his father's shop was next to a cinema hall, he took all advantages of watching all films shown in that hall.

== Career ==
Maniram could nourish his talent since his childhood. He first acted in a One Act Play at the annual day function of his school while he was a student of class VII. Realizing his potentiality in that field, the school authority entrusted him for scripting and directing the One Act Play. In college days in 1990, he chanced upon being the assistant director of an Assamese Video film. He is a self-taught film maker who later became independent in film making. Since 1995 he has been scripting and directing more than 25 TV serials, documentaries and telefilms in English, Assamese and Meitei for Doordarshan and Government departments.

== Filmography ==
- Mon Jaai (2008)
- U R Not My Julie (Unreleased)
- Xondhikhyon (2016)
