= Modi (disambiguation) =

Narendra Modi (born 1950) is an Indian politician serving as the 14th and current prime minister of India since 2014.

Modi may also refer to:

== People ==
- Modi (surname), a surname in India, including a list of people with the name
- Amedeo Modigliani (1884–1920), Italian painter and sculptor, nicknamed Modì
- Modi Rosenfeld (born 1970), Israeli-American stand-up comedian and actor

== Geography ==
- Modi, Chania, a village in Western Crete, Greece
- Modi, Thessaloniki, a village in Central Macedonia, Greece
- Modi (Meteora), a rock in Meteora, Greece
- Módi, an alternate rendering of Modhia, an island in the Ionian Sea
- Minoan Modi, the site of a Minoan peak sanctuary in Eastern Crete, Greece
- Ouro Modi, a commune in Mali
- Modi Khola, a tributary of the Gandaki

== Companies and organizations ==
- ModiCorp, a media company
- ModiLuft, an Indian airlines company
- Modi Enterprises, an Indian group of companies

== Other uses ==
- Modi script, the historical script used in the Maratha empire
  - Modi (Unicode block), a unicode block for Modi scripts
- Modi: Journey of a Common Man, an Indian web series about Narendra Modi
- Móði, one of Thor's sons in Norse mythology
- Modì, Three Days on the Wing of Madness, 2024 film about Amedeo Modigliani directed by Johnny Depp
- Microsoft Office Document Imaging

== See also ==
- Emperor Mo (disambiguation), several Chinese emperors Mo Di
- Mo (disambiguation)
- Di (disambiguation)
- Modia (disambiguation)
- Modis (disambiguation)
- Modi ministry (disambiguation)
- Modi Stadium (disambiguation)
- Oath of office ceremony of Narendra Modi (disambiguation)
