= Tika Utsav =

Indian COVID-19 vaccination programme

Tika Utsav was a four day mass vaccination programme for COVID-19 from April 11, 2021 to April 14, 2021 announced by the Prime Minister of India Narendra Modi in view of the resurgence in the COVID-19 cases in the country with the aim to vaccinate maximum eligible people. Modi in Letter to the Nation said that it is beginning of second major war against COVID-19 Pandemic. The Mass vaccination Programme has started on the birth anniversary of Mahatma Jyotiba Phule and continued till the birth anniversary of Babasaheb Ambedkar on April 14.

== Background ==
In a high level Meeting Chaired by the Prime Minister with the chief minister of all the states and Union Territories he appealed to the chief ministers to organise a "Tika Utsav" or vaccine festival to inoculate so many peoples as possible for the vaccination which would help the country in vaccinating more population.

== Aim ==
It was aimed to vaccinate maximum number of eligible people in the country. In a letter to the Nation Modi urged the people to celebrate the "Tika Utsav'' and stressed four points with regard to the vaccination drive as below:

- Each One- Vaccinate - People who are illiterate and Poor should be assisted to get vaccinated.
- Each One- Treat One- To help people in getting the right treatment of COVID-19.
- Each One- Save One -Everyone should wear a mask to save the other person.

Family members and community members should create ‘micro containment zone’, in case of even a single positive case of COVID-19.

The Prime Minister accentuated the desideratum for testing and tracing. He asked that every eligible person should get vaccinated. This should be the primary effort of both the society and the administration.
