= Modi Stadium =

Modi Stadium may refer to:

- Narendra Modi Stadium, formerly known as Motera Stadium, cricket stadium in Gujarat, India named after Indian prime minister Narendra Modi
- Green Park Stadium, formerly known as Modi Stadium, cricket stadium in Kanpur, Uttar Pradesh
- Syed Modi Railway Stadium, cricket stadium in Gorakhpur, Uttar Pradesh
