= Theodore Modis =

Greek strategic business analyst, futurist, and physicist

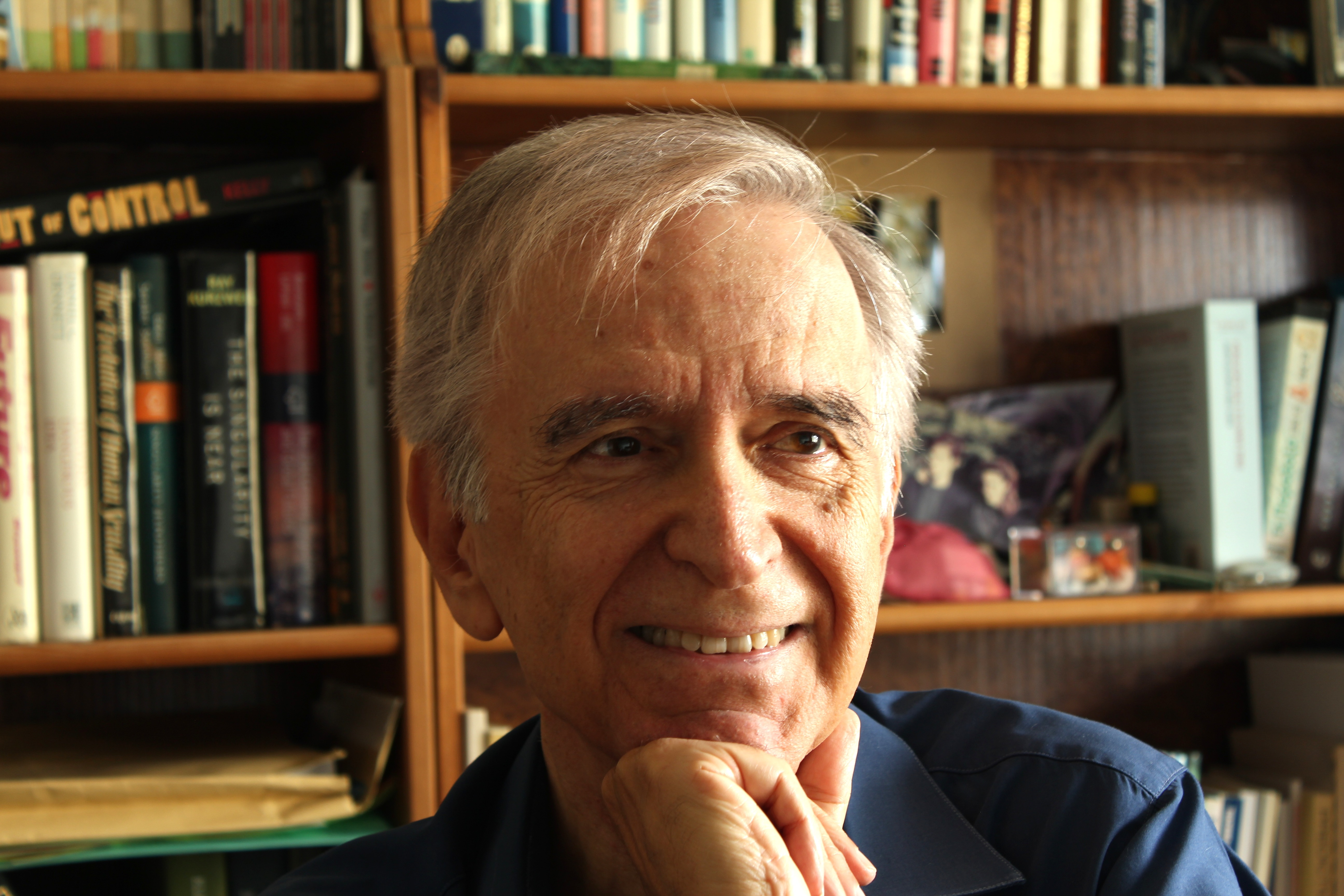
- Modis in 2020
- Born: 11 August 1943 (age 83); Greece
- Education: Anatolia College; Columbia University
- Known for: Expertise in S-Curve; Criticism of the technological singularity
- Scientific career
- Fields: Physics, forecasting, business consulting
- Workplaces: CERN; University of Geneva; Digital Equipment Corporation; Growth Dynamics
- Academic advisors: Jack Steinberger

Theodore Modis (born 11 August 1943) is a strategic business analyst, futurist, physicist, and international consultant. He specializes in applying fundamental scientific concepts to predicting social phenomena. In particular, he uses the law of natural growth in competition as expressed by the logistic function or S-curve to forecast markets, product sales, primary-energy substitutions, the diffusion of technologies, and generally any process that grows in competition. He is a vehement critic of the concept of the technological singularity. He has suggested a simple mathematical relationship between entropy and complexity as the latter being the time derivative of the former. He has argued that societal complexity may be nearing — or already at — its peak.

He currently lives in Lugano, Switzerland.

== Education ==
He went to Columbia University, New York, where he received a master's degree in Electrical Engineering and a Ph.D. in High Energy Physics, (sponsor J. Steinberger). His secondary education was in Greece at Anatolia College in Thessaloniki, Greece.

== Career ==
Modis carried out research in particle physics at Brookhaven National Laboratories and CERN before moving to work at Digital Equipment Corporation for more than a decade as the head of a management science consultants group. He has on occasion taught at Columbia University, the University of Geneva, Webster University, the European business schools INSEAD and IMD, and was a professor at DUXX Graduate School of Business Leadership in Monterrey, Mexico between 1998 and 2001. He has been in the advisory board of the international journal Technological Forecasting & Social Change since 1991. He is also the founder of Growth Dynamics, a Swiss-based organization specializing in business strategy, strategic forecasting and management consulting.

== Publications ==
He has published about one hundred articles in scientific and in business journals, as well as ten books: Predictions, Conquering Uncertainty, An S-Shaped Trail to Wall Street (treating the New York Stock Exchange as an ecosystem), Predictions: 10 Years Later, Bestseller Driven, Natural Laws in the Service of the Decision Maker, Decision-Making for a New World, An S-shaped Adventure: "Predictions" 20 Years Later, Fortune Favors the Bold: A Woman’s Odyssey through a Turbulent Century, and Science with Street Value: A Physicist's Wanderings off the Beaten Track. His books have appeared in a number of other languages; Predictions has been translated into German, Japanese, and Greek, and Conquering Uncertainty has been translated into Chinese Long Form, Chinese Short Form, Greek, and Dutch. Fortune Favors the Bold: A Woman’s Odyssey through a Turbulent Century has been translated into Greek and published under the title ΘΕΟΔΟΣΙΑ.

== Distinctions ==
- 2017 Certificate of Outstanding Contribution in Reviewing by the international journal Technological Forecasting & Social Change
- 1997 Outstanding-Paper-of-the-Year Award by the international journal Technological Forecasting & Social Change
- Dean's List during undergraduate at Columbia University
- First in class during High School at Anatolia College

== Praise for Predictions ==
- "Interesting, well written, enjoyable, controversial, thought-provoking." - Simon van der Meer, Physicist, Nobel Prize 1984.
- "A lot of highly selective fun re-invoking much in my own past experiences." - George Wald, professor emeritus of biology at Harvard, Nobel Prize 1967.
- "You must read this book. It is the most delightful one on forecasting I have encountered in a very long time. Written for the enjoyment of both layperson and professional, it is fascinating and provocative." - Harold Linstone, Editor in Chief; Technological Forecasting & Social Change, 1992.
- "We have the technology now to forecast many social phenomena ... . I follow the work of Theodore Modis, who nicely sums up the case for utility and believability of predictions." - Kevin Kelly (editor), Executive Editor of WIRED.
- "A fascinating technique for making forecasts." - THE FUTURIST.
- "... he (Modis) does cite the relationship of his 'overall' 56-year cycles and evidence on the associated clustering of technological innovations to prior work by Kondratieff and Schumpeter (in my opinion, Modis’ evidence on these topics is more extensive and compelling than that of either of these scholars.)" - Kenneth Land, SCIENCE.
- "Can a well-known mathematical equation be used to predict a wide range of human activity? Maybe." - Vernon Church, NEWSWEEK.

== iPhone/iPad applications ==
He has created two applications for iPhone/iPad, The S_Curve and Biorhythm_Science. Together with Vasco Almeida they created applications that forecast stock prices like species by treating the stock market as an ecosystem: Stock Fcsts and 2Stock Fcsts for the iPhone and Stocks' Futures and 2Stocks' Future for the iPad.

== Partial bibliography ==
- An S-Shaped Adventure - "Predictions" 20 Years Later, Growth Dynamics, Lugano, Switzerland, November 2014.
- An S-Shaped Trail to Wall Street - Survival of the Fittest Reigns at the Stock Market, Growth Dynamics, Geneva, Switzerland, April 1999.
- Conquering Uncertainty: Understanding Corporate Cycles and Positioning Your Company to Survive the Changing Environment BusinessWeek Books, McGraw-Hill, New York, June 1998.
- Predictions - Society's Telltale Signature Reveals the Past and Forecasts the Future, Simon & Schuster, New York, 1992.
- Predictions: - 10 Years Later, Growth Dynamics, Geneva, Switzerland, October 2000.
- Bestseller Driven, Growth Dynamics, Lugano, Switzerland, 2005.
- Natural Laws in the Service of the Decision Maker - How to Use Science-Based Methodologies to See more Clearly further into the Future, Growth Dynamics, Lugano, Switzerland, July 2013.
- Decision-Making for a New World: Natural Laws of Evolution and Competition as a Road Map to Revolutionary New Management, Campus Verlag-edition MALIK, Frankfurt, July 2018.
- Fortune Favors the Bold: A Woman’s Odyssey through a Turbulent Century, ibidem Press, Stuttgart, October 2018. Greek edition under the title ΘΕΟΔΟΣΙΑ, Livani Publishing Organizations, Athens, Greece, November 2020.
- Science with Street Value: A Physicist’s Wanderings off the Beaten Track, ibidem Press, Stuttgart, October 2020.
- Forecasting the Growth of Complexity and Change, Technological Forecasting & Social Change, 69, No 4, 2002 - an essay about the growth of complexity in the universe.

== Personal life ==
Modis is the father of Yorgo Modis, the grandson of Theodoros Modis, and nephew of Georgios Modis.
