= Theodoros Modis =

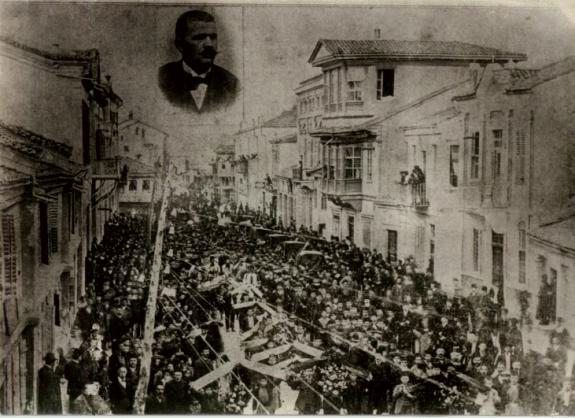
Photograph of the funeral of Theodoros Modis.

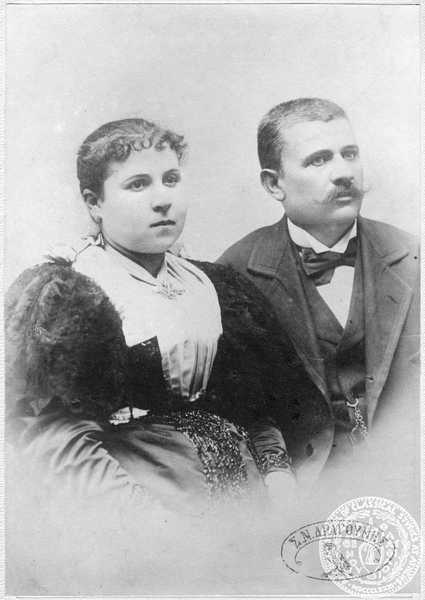
Theodoros and his wife Paraskevi.

Theodoros Modis (Greek: Θεόδωρος Μόδης) was a Greek lumber merchant and scholar from Monastiri (modern Bitola, North Macedonia).

He was among those who helped the founders of the Revolutionary Internal Organization in its formation, in order to defend Greek interests in Macedonia (Ottoman Empire at the time.). He was assassinated in his shop by Bulgarian komitadji on September 4, 1904. His assassination, like the killing of Pavlos Melas a month later, is among the violent events that marked the beginning of the Macedonian Struggle (Μακεδονικός Αγώνας in Greek).

He is the grandfather of Theodore Modis, the great-grandfather of Yorgo Modis, and the uncle of Georgios Modis.
