= Pabitra Margherita =

Indian politician and actor

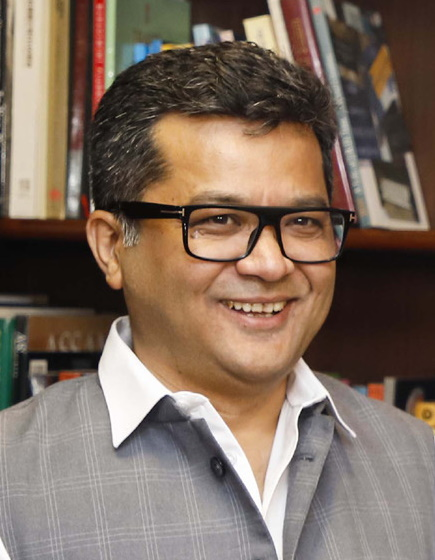
- Pabitra Margherita

Union Minister of State for External Affairs and Textiles
- Incumbent
- Assumed office 11 June 2024
- Preceded by: Rajkumar Ranjan Singh

Member of Parliament, Rajya Sabha
- Incumbent
- Assumed office 31 March 2022
- Preceded by: Ranee Narah, INC
- Constituency: Assam

Personal details
- Born: Pabitra Gogoi; 13 October 1974 (age 51) Margherita, Assam
- Party: Bharatiya Janata Party
- Spouse: Gayatri Mahanta
- Children: 3
- Education: Margherita College; Jagannath Barooah College; Assam Textile Institute

Pabitra Margherita (born Pabitra Gogoi; 13 October 1974) is an Indian politician and former actor. He is currently serving as a Minister of State for External Affairs and also as a Minister of State for the Ministry of Textiles in the Third Modi ministry.

== Political career ==
Margherita joined politics in 2014 and became an active BJP member. He has served as a spokesperson of Assam BJP since 2014. He also served as Prabhari of Social Media Cell, Assam BJP and Zila Prabhari of Kamrup (North) District BJP. He also served as Chairman of Jyoti Chitraban, Govt. of Assam from 2017 to 2021. He also served as Member Secretary of State Level Advisory Committee for Students and Youth Welfare, Govt. of Assam from November 2021 to March 2022.

Margherita was elected as a Member of Parliament, representing Assam in the Rajya Sabha, the upper house of India's Parliament, as a member of the Bharatiya Janata Party (BJP) during the 2022 Rajya Sabha elections. He received 46 votes, the most of any candidate in the Assam Legislative Assembly.

Margherita took oath as a Minister of State in the Third Modi ministry in 2024. He is presently a Minister of State in the Ministry of External Affairs, and a Minister of State in the Ministry of Textiles. He is a member of the Consultative Committee of the Ministry of Information and Broadcasting. He is also the Political Secretary to the Chief Minister of Assam.

== Acting career ==
Margherita's career began as an anchor and an actor. His first film was Tumi Mur Mathu Mur with co-star and director Zubeen Garg. His other films include Junbai, Hero and lastly, Mon Jaai, which is one of the biggest hit films of all time in Assamese cinema.

== Filmography ==
=== Films ===
Year	Title	Roles	Director	Languages	Note(s)
2000	Tumi Mor Matho Mor	Arunabh	Zubeen Garg	Assamese	Debut film as an actor
2005	Junbai		Rajesh Bhuyan	Assamese	
2005	Zubeen Manasor Jatra	Himself (Presenter)	Manas Robin	Assamese	Direct-to-video musical concert film
2006	Hero	Pabitra Gogoi	Rajesh Bhuyan	Bengali	
2008	Mon Jaai	Nayan	M. Maniram	Assamese	

=== Web series ===
Year	Title	Roles	Director	Language(s)	Notes	Ref(s)
2026	Zubeen-Manasor Jatra: Web Series Edition	Himself (presenter)	Manas Robin	Assamese	Archive footage; Assamese musical concert mini-web series contains previously unseen live concert footages between 2004 and 2005.	

== Discography ==
=== As a spoken vocals ===
Films
Year	Title	Director	Music director
2004	Hridoy Kapuwa Gaan	Jayanta Nath	
2004	Dinabandhu	Munin Barua	Zubeen Garg
2005	Junbai	Rajesh Bhuyan	Manas Robin
2006	Junbai Dwitiya	Rajesh Bhuyan	Manas Robin
2006	Hero	Rajesh Bhuyan	Manas Robin

Non-films
Year	Title	Artist(s)
2001	Hiyamon	Zubeen Garg, Babita Sharma
2002	Akou Hiyamon	Zubeen Garg, Babita Sharma
2002	Shishu	Zubeen Garg, Jonkey Borthakur
2003	Sinaki Mon	Zubeen Garg
2004	Lajuki Mon	Zubeen Garg, Subasana Dutta
2004	Jantra	Zubeen Garg
2005	Sinaki Xur	Zubeen Garg and others
2006	It's All About Love	Sagarika
2006	Nayaa	Anaida
2006	Mukha	Zubeen Garg
2008	Ponkhi	Zubeen Garg, Ponkhi, Bijoy Kashyap
2008	Rumaal	Zubeen Garg

== See also ==
- Third Modi ministry
