= Georgios Modis =

Greek Aromanian writer, politician and journalist (1887–1975)

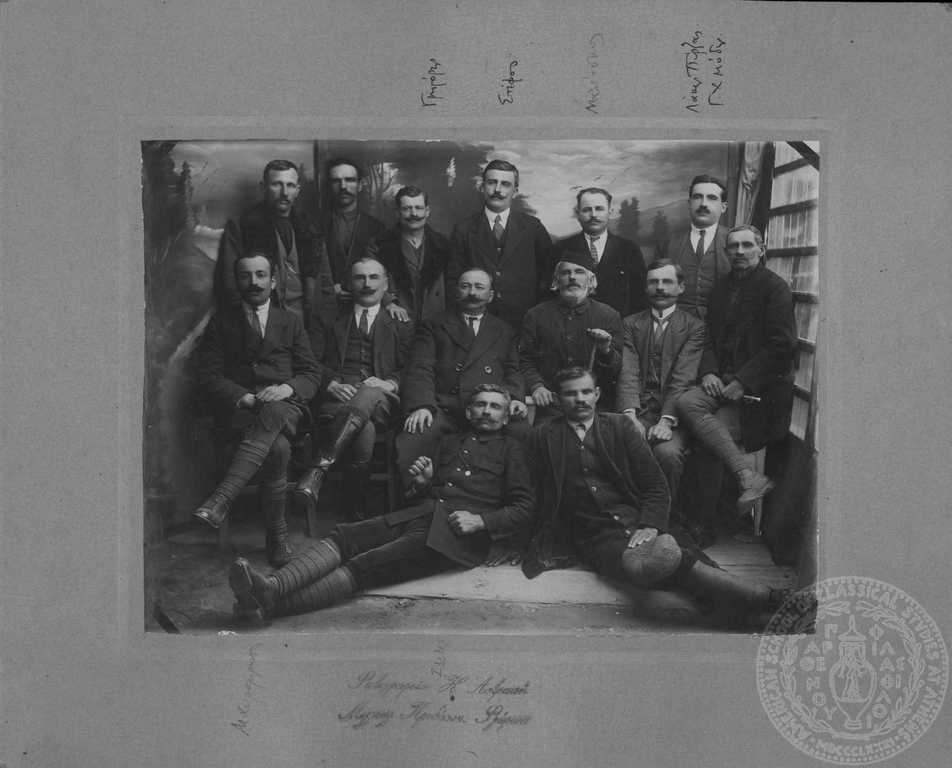
- Georgios Modis at the top right.
- Native name: Γεώργιος Μόδης
- Born: 14 May 1887; Monastir, Monastir Vilayet, Ottoman Empire (now Bitola, Republic of North Macedonia)
- Died: 18 June 1975 (aged 88) Thessaloniki, Third Hellenic Republic
- Allegiance: Kingdom of Greece
- Branch: Hellenic Army; HMC
- Conflicts: Macedonian Struggle; Balkan Wars: First Balkan War; Second Balkan War
- Education: University of Athens
- Other work: Jurist; MP for Florina; Prefect of Florina; Governor-General of Epirus; Governor-General of Macedonia; Interior Minister; Minister of Education; Author; Member of the Society for Macedonian Studies

Georgios Modis (Greek: Γεώργιος Μόδης; 14 May 1887 – 18 June 1975) was a Greek jurist, politician, and writer of Aromanian origin who participated in the Macedonian Struggle.

== Biography ==
Georgios Modis was an Aromanian. He was born in 1887 in Monastir (modern Bitola). He graduated from the gymnasium of Monastir in 1906 and immediately joined the guerrilla group of the Cretan Georgios Volanis who was active in the area of Mariovo. He participated in many fights with Bulgarian komitadjis and Ottoman troops and was wounded in a battle with the Ottoman army in Besitsa, near Mariovo. After his injury he abandoned the armed struggle. The Internal Organisation of Monastir appointed him secretary in the Metropolis of Moglena and Florina in 1909, where he served for a short time. Then, he returned to Monastir and was a reporter for the local newspaper Fos ("Light") published by the Political Club of Monastir.

After the Balkan Wars, when Florina became part of Greece, he studied law at the University of Athens and commerce in the academy of Othon Rousopoulos. He was a Member of the Hellenic Parliament for the Florina Prefecture for many years and served as Prefect of Florina. From 1932–33 he assumed the position of Governor-General of Epirus. During the Axis occupation of Greece, he was arrested by the Germans and was imprisoned in the Pavlou Mela barracks in Thessaloniki. After his release, he fled to the Middle East where he joined the Greek government in exile. In October 1944 he returned to Greece and was appointed by Georgios Papandreou as Governor-General of Macedonia. In 1950 he assumed the position of Minister of the Interior and in 1951 Minister of Education.

He was an active author, his main works being: "Μακεδονικές Ιστορίες" (Macedonian Stories) and "Αγώνες στη Μακεδονία" (Struggles in Macedonia) which was unfinished at his death in 1975. Modis was a member of the Society for Macedonian Studies, and organised many committees of Macedonian Struggle fighters in order to erect statues to prominent protagonists of the Struggle. He also served as president of the committee for the construction of statues of Alexander the Great, Philip and Aristotle. Under the Greek military junta of 1967–1974 he was forced by the regime to resign from the presidency of the committee.

In 2011, a bust of Modis was erected in the town square of Florina at the expense of the Association of Monastiriots of Florina and Environs "Elpis".

He is the nephew of Theodoros Modis and the uncle of Theodore Modis.
