= Third Modi ministry =

Incumbent government of India (2024–present)

- 26th Ministry of the Republic of India

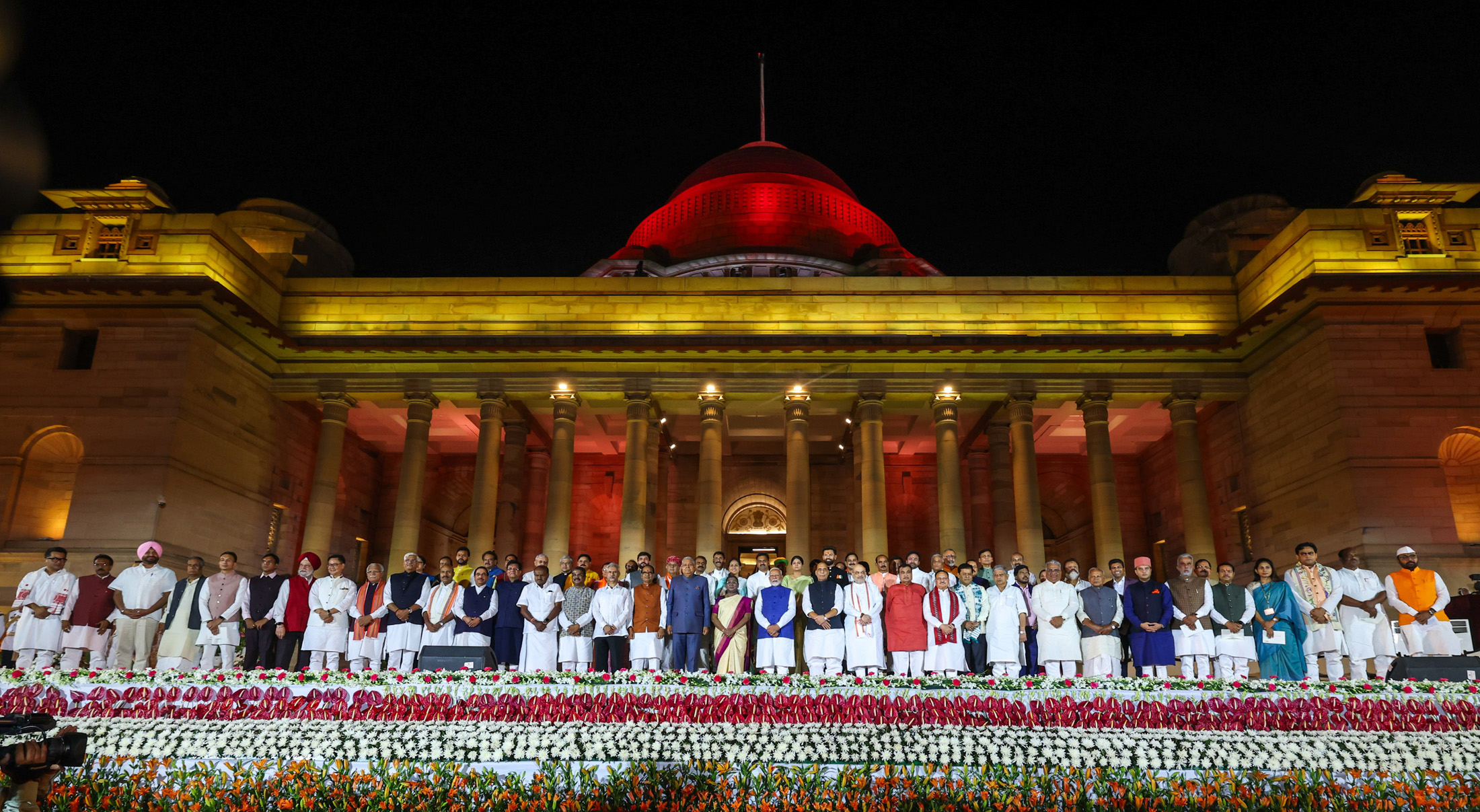
- Date formed: 9 June 2024

People and organisations
- President: Droupadi Murmu
- Prime Minister: Narendra Modi
- No. of ministers: 30 cabinet ministers 5 ministers of state (Independent Charge); 34 ministers of state
- Ministers removed: 3
- Total no. of members: 72
- Member parties: National Democratic Alliance: Bharatiya Janata Party; Janata Dal (Secular); Hindustani Awam Morcha; Janata Dal (United); Telugu Desam Party; Lok Janshakti Party (Ram Vilas); Shiv Sena; Rashtriya Lok Dal; Republican Party of India (Athawale); Apna Dal (Soneylal)
- Status in legislature: Coalition
- Opposition party: Indian National Congress (INDIA)
- Opposition leader: Rahul Gandhi, INC (Lok Sabha)

History
- Incoming formation: 18th Lok Sabha
- Election: 2024
- Legislature terms: 2 years, 157 days
- Budgets: 2024 Budget; 2025 Budget; 2026 Budget
- Predecessor: Second Modi ministry

The Third Modi ministry, also called Modi 3.0, is the union council of ministers of India headed by the Prime Minister of India Narendra Modi, which was formed after the 2024 Indian general election held in seven phases from 19 April to 1 June 2024. The results of the election were announced on 4 June 2024, leading to the formation of the 18th Lok Sabha. The union council of ministers was sworn in along with the Prime Minister on 9 June 2024. The oath ceremony was arranged in the forecourt of Rashtrapati Bhavan at Raisina Hill. This ministry marks the second-largest Union Council of Ministers in Indian history, after the Third Vajpayee ministry.

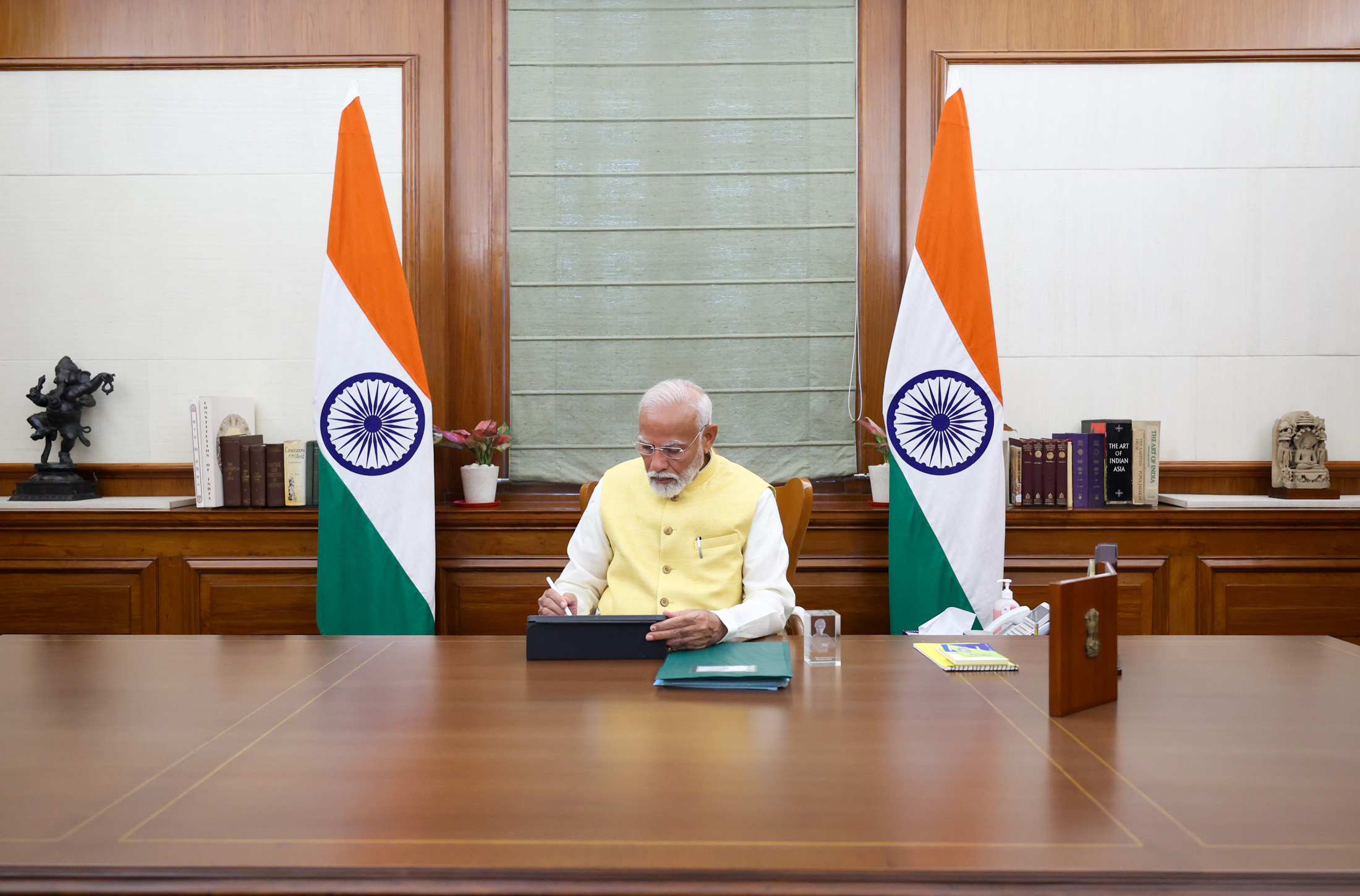
Modi taking charge of the Prime Minister of India for the third consecutive term

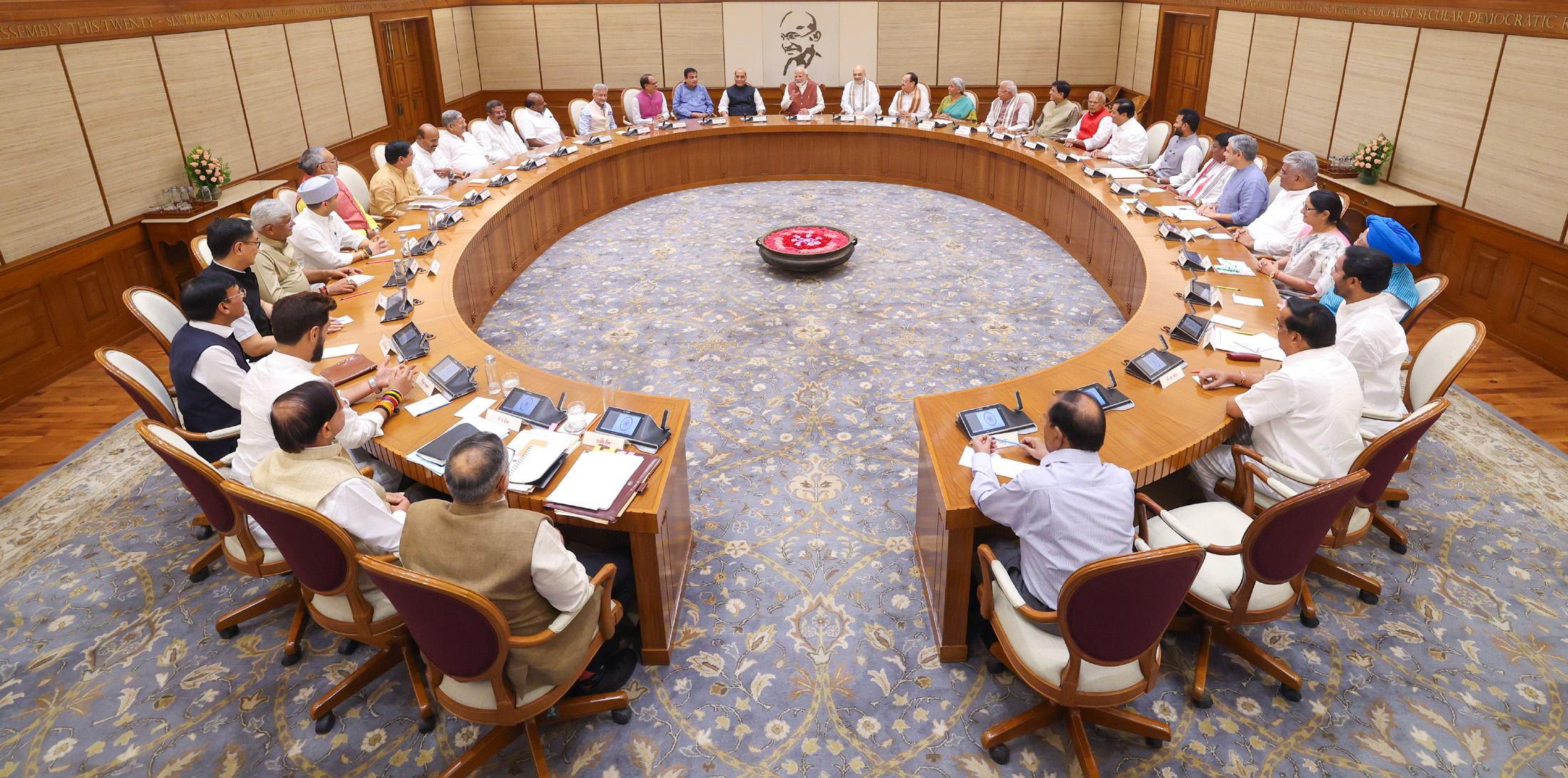
Re-elected Prime Minister of India, Shri Narendra Modi, chairs the first Union Cabinet Meeting of his third term in New Delhi, to discuss the basic plans and distribute ministries among the ministers.

== History ==
The Third Modi ministry came into existence following the 2024 general election to the 18th Lok Sabha in which the Bharatiya Janata Party-led National Democratic Alliance emerged victorious winning 293 of the 543 seats of the Lok Sabha.

PM Modi chaired the first cabinet meeting on 10 June 2024 and the portfolios of the Union Council of Ministers was released shortly after.

28 out of 71 ministers (39%) in PM Modi's third-term cabinet have declared criminal cases against them. Of these, 19 ministers (27%) face serious criminal charges such as attempted murder, crimes against women and hate speech.

== List of ministers ==
The following is the complete list of the Cabinet Ministers of India:

=== Cabinet Ministers ===
Portfolio	Minister	Took office	Left office	Party	Remarks
Prime Minister; Minister of Personnel, Public Grievances and Pensions; Department of Atomic Energy; Department of Space; All important policy issues; and All other portfolios not allocated to any Minister.	Narendra Modi	9 June 2024	Incumbent	BJP	
Minister of Defence	Rajnath Singh	10 June 2024	Incumbent	BJP	
Minister of Home Affairs; Minister of Co-operation	Amit Shah	10 June 2024	Incumbent	BJP	
Minister of Road Transport and Highways	Nitin Gadkari	10 June 2024	Incumbent	BJP	
Minister of Health and Family Welfare; Minister of Chemicals and Fertilizers	Jagat Prakash Nadda	10 June 2024	Incumbent	BJP	
Minister of Agriculture and Farmers' Welfare; Minister of Rural Development	Shivraj Singh Chouhan	10 June 2024	Incumbent	BJP	
Minister of Finance; Minister of Corporate Affairs	Nirmala Sitharaman	10 June 2024	Incumbent	BJP	
Minister of External Affairs	S. Jaishankar	10 June 2024	Incumbent	BJP	
Minister of Power; Minister of Housing and Urban Affairs	Manohar Lal Khattar	10 June 2024	Incumbent	BJP	
Minister of Heavy Industries; Minister of Steel	H. D. Kumaraswamy	10 June 2024	Incumbent	JD(S)	
Minister of Commerce and Industry	Piyush Goyal	10 June 2024	Incumbent	BJP	
Minister of Education	Dharmendra Pradhan	10 June 2024	25 July 2026	BJP	Resigned.
Minister of Education	Pralhad Joshi	25 July 2026	Incumbent	BJP	Additional charge following the resignation of Dharmendra Pradhan.
Minister of Micro, Small and Medium Enterprises	Jitan Ram Manjhi	10 June 2024	Incumbent	HAM(S)	
Minister of Panchayati Raj; Minister of Fisheries, Animal Husbandry and Dairying	Lalan Singh	10 June 2024	Incumbent	JD(U)	
Minister of Ports, Shipping and Waterways	Sarbananda Sonowal	10 June 2024	Incumbent	BJP	
Minister of Social Justice and Empowerment	Virendra Kumar Khatik	10 June 2024	Incumbent	BJP	
Minister of Civil Aviation	Kinjarapu Ram Mohan Naidu	10 June 2024	Incumbent	TDP	
Minister of Consumer Affairs, Food and Public Distribution; Minister of New and Renewable Energy	Prahlad Joshi	10 June 2024	Incumbent	BJP	
Minister of Tribal Affairs	Jual Oram	10 June 2024	Incumbent	BJP	
Minister of Textiles	Giriraj Singh	10 June 2024	Incumbent	BJP	
Minister of Railways; Minister of Information and Broadcasting; Minister of Electronics and Information Technology	Ashwini Vaishnaw	10 June 2024	Incumbent	BJP	
Minister of Communications; Minister of Development of North Eastern Region	Jyotiraditya Scindia	10 June 2024	Incumbent	BJP	
Minister of Environment, Forest and Climate Change	Bhupender Yadav	10 June 2024	Incumbent	BJP	
Minister of Culture; Minister of Tourism	Gajendra Singh Shekhawat	10 June 2024	Incumbent	BJP	
Minister of Women and Child Development	Annpurna Devi	10 June 2024	Incumbent	BJP	
Minister of Parliamentary Affairs; Minister of Minority Affairs	Kiren Rijiju	10 June 2024	Incumbent	BJP	
Minister of Petroleum and Natural Gas	Hardeep Singh Puri	10 June 2024	Incumbent	BJP	
Minister of Labour and Employment; Minister of Youth Affairs and Sports	Mansukh L. Mandaviya	10 June 2024	Incumbent	BJP	
Minister of Coal; Minister of Mines	G. Kishan Reddy	10 June 2024	Incumbent	BJP	
Minister of Food Processing Industries	Chirag Paswan	10 June 2024	Incumbent	LJP(RV)	
Minister of Jal Shakti	C. R. Patil	10 June 2024	Incumbent	BJP	

=== Ministers of State (Independent Charge) ===
Portfolio	Minister	Took office	Left office	Party	Remarks
Minister of State (Independent Charge) of the Ministry of Statistics and Programme Implementation; Minister of State (Independent Charge) of the Ministry of Planning	Rao Inderjit Singh	10 June 2024	Incumbent	BJP	
Minister of State (Independent Charge) of the Ministry of Science and Technology; Minister of State (Independent Charge) of the Ministry of Earth Sciences	Jitendra Singh	10 June 2024	Incumbent	BJP	
Minister of State (Independent Charge) of the Ministry of Law and Justice	Arjun Ram Meghwal	10 June 2024	Incumbent	BJP	
Minister of State (Independent Charge) of the Ministry of AYUSH	Prataprao Ganpatrao Jadhav	10 June 2024	Incumbent	SHS	
Minister of State (Independent Charge) of the Ministry of Skill Development and Entrepreneurship	Jayant Chaudhary	10 June 2024	Incumbent	RLD	

=== Ministers of State ===
Portfolio	Minister	Took office	Left office	Party	Remarks
Minister of State in the Ministry of Culture	Rao Inderjit Singh	10 June 2024	Incumbent	BJP	
Minister of State in the Prime Minister’s Office; Minister of State in the Ministry of Personnel, Public Grievances and Pensions; Minister of State in the Department of Atomic Energy; Minister of State in the Department of Space	Jitendra Singh	10 June 2024	Incumbent	BJP	
Minister of State in the Ministry of Parliamentary Affairs	Arjun Ram Meghwal	10 June 2024	Incumbent	BJP	
Minister of State in the Ministry of Parliamentary Affairs	L. Murugan	10 June 2024	13 October 2026	BJP	
Minister of State in the Ministry of Health and Family Welfare	Prataprao Ganpatrao Jadhav	10 June 2024	Incumbent	SHS	
Minister of State in the Ministry of Health and Family Welfare	Anupriya Patel	10 June 2024	Incumbent	AD(S)	
Minister of State in the Ministry of Education	Jayant Chaudhary	10 June 2024	Incumbent	RLD	
Minister of State in the Ministry of Education	Sukanta Majumdar	10 June 2024	Incumbent	BJP	
Minister of State in the Ministry of Commerce and Industry; Minister of State in the Ministry of Electronics and Information Technology	Jitin Prasada	10 June 2024	Incumbent	BJP	
Minister of State in the Ministry of Power; Minister of State in the Ministry of New and Renewable Energy	Shripad Yesso Naik	10 June 2024	Incumbent	BJP	
Minister of State in the Ministry of Finance	Pankaj Chaudhary	10 June 2024	Incumbent	BJP	
Minister of State in the Ministry of Co-operation	Krishan Pal Gurjar	10 June 2024	Incumbent	BJP	
Minister of State in the Ministry of Co-operation	Murlidhar Mohol	10 June 2024	Incumbent	BJP	
Minister of State in the Ministry of Social Justice and Empowerment	Ramdas Athawale	10 June 2024	Incumbent	RPI(A)	
Minister of State in the Ministry of Social Justice and Empowerment	B. L. Verma	10 June 2024	Incumbent	BJP	
Minister of State in the Ministry of Agriculture and Farmers Welfare	Ram Nath Thakur	10 June 2024	Incumbent	JD(U)	
Minister of State in the Ministry of Agriculture and Farmers Welfare	Bhagirath Choudhary	10 June 2024	Incumbent	BJP	
Minister of State in the Ministry of Home Affairs	Nityanand Rai	10 June 2024	Incumbent	BJP	
Minister of State in the Ministry of Home Affairs	Bandi Sanjay Kumar	10 June 2024	Incumbent	BJP	
Minister of State in the Ministry of Chemicals and Fertilizers	Anupriya Patel	10 June 2024	Incumbent	AD(S)	
Minister of State in the Ministry of Jal Shakti	V. Somanna	10 June 2024	Incumbent	BJP	
Minister of State in the Ministry of Jal Shakti	Raj Bhushan Choudhary	10 June 2024	Incumbent	BJP	
Minister of State in the Ministry of Railways	V. Somanna	10 June 2024	Incumbent	BJP	
Minister of State in the Ministry of Railways	Ravneet Singh Bittu	10 June 2024	24 July 2026	BJP	Resigned.
Minister of State in the Ministry of Rural Development	Pemmasani Chandra Sekhar	10 June 2024	Incumbent	TDP	
Minister of State in the Ministry of Rural Development	Kamlesh Paswan	10 June 2024	Incumbent	BJP	
Minister of State in the Ministry of Communications	Pemmasani Chandra Sekhar	10 June 2024	Incumbent	TDP	
Minister of State in the Ministry of Fisheries, Animal Husbandry and Dairying	S. P. Singh Baghel	10 June 2024	Incumbent	BJP	
Minister of State in the Ministry of Fisheries, Animal Husbandry and Dairying	George Kurian	10 June 2024	23 June 2026	BJP	Resigned.
Minister of State in the Ministry of Panchayati Raj	S. P. Singh Baghel	10 June 2024	Incumbent	BJP	
Minister of State in the Ministry of Micro, Small and Medium Enterprises; Minister of State in the Ministry of Labour and Employment	Shobha Karandlaje	10 June 2024	Incumbent	BJP	
Minister of State in the Ministry of Environment, Forest and Climate Change	Kirti Vardhan Singh	10 June 2024	Incumbent	BJP	
Minister of State in the Ministry of External Affairs	Kirti Vardhan Singh	10 June 2024	Incumbent	BJP	
Minister of State in the Ministry of External Affairs	Pabitra Margherita	10 June 2024	Incumbent	BJP	
Minister of State in the Ministry of Consumer Affairs, Food and Public Distribution	B. L. Verma	10 June 2024	Incumbent	BJP	
Minister of State in the Ministry of Consumer Affairs, Food and Public Distribution	Nimuben Bambhaniya	10 June 2024	Incumbent	BJP	
Minister of State in the Ministry of Ports, Shipping and Waterways	Shantanu Thakur	10 June 2024	Incumbent	BJP	
Minister of State in the Ministry of Petroleum and Natural Gas; Minister of State in the Ministry of Tourism	Suresh Gopi	10 June 2024	Incumbent	BJP	
Minister of State in the Ministry of Information and Broadcasting	L. Murugan	10 June 2024	13 October 2026	BJP	
Minister of State in the Ministry of Road Transport and Highways	Ajay Tamta	10 June 2024	Incumbent	BJP	
Minister of State in the Ministry of Road Transport and Highways	Harsh Malhotra	10 June 2024	Incumbent	BJP	
Minister of State in the Ministry of Coal; Minister of State in the Ministry of Mines	Satish Chandra Dubey	10 June 2024	Incumbent	BJP	
Minister of State in the Ministry of Defence	Sanjay Seth	10 June 2024	Incumbent	BJP	
Minister of State in the Ministry of Food Processing Industries	Ravneet Singh Bittu	10 June 2024	24 July 2026	BJP	Resigned.
Minister of State in the Ministry of Tribal Affairs	Durga Das Uikey	10 June 2024	Incumbent	BJP	
Minister of State in the Ministry of Youth Affairs and Sports	Raksha Khadse	10 June 2024	Incumbent	BJP	
Minister of State in the Ministry of Development of North Eastern Region	Sukanta Majumdar	10 June 2024	Incumbent	BJP	
Minister of State in the Ministry of Women and Child Development	Savitri Thakur	10 June 2024	Incumbent	BJP	
Minister of State in the Ministry of Housing and Urban Affairs	Tokhan Sahu	10 June 2024	Incumbent	BJP	
Minister of State in the Ministry of Heavy Industries; Minister of State in the Ministry of Steel	Bhupathi Raju Srinivasa Varma	10 June 2024	Incumbent	BJP	
Minister of State in the Ministry of Corporate Affairs	Harsh Malhotra	10 June 2024	Incumbent	BJP	
Minister of State in the Ministry of Civil Aviation	Murlidhar Mohol	10 June 2024	Incumbent	BJP	
Minister of State in the Ministry of Minority Affairs	George Kurian	10 June 2024	23 June 2026	BJP	Resigned.
Minister of State in the Ministry of Textiles	Pabitra Margherita	10 June 2024	Incumbent	BJP	

== Demographics ==
Representation of cabinet ministers by party
1. Bharatiya Janata Party (84.1%)
2. Janata Dal (United) (2.90%)
3. Telugu Desam Party (2.90%)
4. Janata Dal (Secular) (1.45%)
5. Hindustani Awam Morcha (1.45%)
6. Lok Janshakti Party (Ram Vilas) (1.45%)
7. Shiv Sena (1.45%)
8. Rashtriya Lok Dal (1.45%)
9. Republican Party of India (A) (1.45%)
10. Apna Dal (Soneylal) (1.45%)

=== Parties ===
Party	Cabinet Ministers	Ministers of State (Independent Charge)	Ministers of State	Total Number of Ministers
BJP	25 (Note: Including Prime Minister)	3	30	58
JD(U)	1	0	1	2
TDP	1	0	1	2
JD(S)	1	0	0	1
HAM(S)	1	0	0	1
LJP(RV)	1	0	0	1
SHS	0	1	0	1
RLD	0	1	0	1
RPI(A)	0	0	1	1
AD(S)	0	0	1	1
Total	30	5	35	69

=== States ===
State	Cabinet Ministers	Ministers of State (Independent Charge)	Ministers of State	Total number of ministers	Name of ministers
Andhra Pradesh	1	—	2	3	Kinjarapu Ram Mohan Naidu; Chandra Sekhar Pemmasani; Bhupathi Raju Srinivasa Varma
Arunachal Pradesh	1	—	—	1	Kiren Rijiju
Assam	1	—	1	2	Sarbananda Sonowal; Pabitra Margherita
Bihar	4	—	4	8	Jitan Ram Manjhi; Lalan Singh; Giriraj Singh; Chirag Paswan; Ram Nath Thakur; Nityanand Rai; Satish Chandra Dubey; Raj Bhushan Choudhary
Chhattisgarh	—	—	1	1	Tokhan Sahu
Goa	—	—	1	1	Shripad Yesso Naik
Gujarat	5	—	1	6	Amit Shah; Jagat Prakash Nadda; S. Jaishankar; Mansukh L. Mandaviya; C. R. Patil; Nimuben Bambhaniya
Haryana	1	1	1	3	Manohar Lal Khattar; Rao Inderjit Singh; Krishan Pal Gurjar
Jharkhand	1	—	1	2	Annpurna Devi; Sanjay Seth
Karnataka	3	—	2	5	Nirmala Sitharaman; H. D. Kumaraswamy; Prahlad Joshi; V. Somanna; Shobha Karandlaje
Kerala	—	—	1	1	Suresh Gopi
Madhya Pradesh	3	—	3	6	Shivraj Singh Chouhan; Virendra Kumar Khatik; Jyotiraditya Scindia; L. Murugan; Durga Das Uikey; Savitri Thakur
Maharashtra	2	1	3	6	Nitin Gadkari; Piyush Goyal; Prataprao Ganpatrao Jadhav; Ramdas Athawale; Raksha Khadse; Murlidhar Mohol
Odisha	2	—	—	2	Jual Oram; Ashwini Vaishnaw
Rajasthan	2	1	1	4	Bhupender Yadav; Gajendra Singh Shekhawat; Arjun Ram Meghwal; Bhagirath Choudhary
Telangana	1	—	1	2	G. Kishan Reddy; Bandi Sanjay Kumar
Uttar Pradesh	3	1	7	11	Narendra Modi (Prime Minister); Rajnath Singh; Hardeep Singh Puri; Jayant Chaudhary; Jitin Prasada; Pankaj Chaudhary; Anupriya Patel; S. P. Singh Baghel; Kirti Vardhan Singh; B. L. Verma; Kamlesh Paswan
Uttarakhand	—	—	1	1	Ajay Tamta
West Bengal	—	—	2	2	Shantanu Thakur; Sukanta Majumdar
Delhi	—	—	1	1	Harsh Malhotra
Jammu and Kashmir	—	1	—	1	Jitendra Singh
Total	30	5	34	69	

== Demographics of former ministers ==
=== Parties ===
Party	Cabinet Ministers	Ministers of State (I/C)	Ministers of State	Total number of ministers
BJP	1	0	2	3
Total	1	0	2	3

=== States ===
State	Cabinet Ministers	Ministers of State (I/C)	Ministers of State	Total number of ministers	Name of ministers
Madhya Pradesh	—	—	1	1	George Kurian (Note: Until 21 June 2026)
Odisha	1	—	—	1	Dharmendra Pradhan
Rajasthan	—	—	1	1	Ravneet Singh Bittu
Total	1	0	2	3	

== See also ==
- 18th Lok Sabha
- List of members of the 18th Lok Sabha
- 2024 Speaker of the Lok Sabha election
- Union Council of Ministers
- Premiership of Narendra Modi
- 2025 Mahadevapura Electoral Controversy
