= Modia gens =

The gens Modia was a minor family at Ancient Rome, known from a small number of individuals.

== Praenomina ==
The Modii are known to have used the praenomina Quintus, Septimus, Marcus, Gaius, and Lucius, all of which were very common, except for Septimus, which was quite unusual. The first Modius to appear in history was a duumvir of Luceria in Apulia at the end of the Pyrrhic War; the gens might therefore come from this city.

== Members ==
- Gaius Modius Cr. f., duumvir of Luceria circa 275 BC; he minted bronze coins during his magistracy. (Note: The praenomen of his father abbreviated "Cr." on his coins does not refer to any known Latin praenomen.)
- Septimus Modius, known from an inscription.
- Quintus Modius Equiculus, mentioned by Varro.
- Marcus Modius, mentioned by Cicero.
- Gaius Modius Justus, propraetor of Numidia in an uncertain year.
- Quintus Modius, described as the brother of Gaius Vibius Postumus, probably the same who was proconsul of Asia during the reign of Nero.
- Modia, a Roman matron mentioned by Juvenal.
- Modius Terventinus, praefectus vehiculorum in AD 214.
- Modius Julius, governor of Britannia Inferior in AD 219.
- Gaius Modius Taurus, a Roman aristocrat, mentioned in an inscription of uncertain date.

== See also ==
- List of Roman gentes

== Bibliography ==
- Marcus Terentius Varro, Rerum Rusticarum (Rural Matters).
- Marcus Tullius Cicero, In Verrem.
- Decimus Junius Juvenalis, Satirae (Satires).
- Dictionary of Greek and Roman Biography and Mythology, William Smith, ed., Little, Brown and Company, Boston (1849).
- August Pauly, Georg Wissowa, et alii, Realencyclopädie der Classischen Altertumswissenschaft, J. B. Metzler, Stuttgart (1894–1980).
- George Davis Chase, "The Origin of Roman Praenomina", in Harvard Studies in Classical Philology, vol. VIII (1897).
- Paul von Rohden, Elimar Klebs, & Hermann Dessau, Prosopographia Imperii Romani (The Prosopography of the Roman Empire, abbreviated PIR), Berlin (1898).
- Oliver D. Hoover, Handbook of Coins of Italy and Magna Graecia, Sixth to First Centuries BC [The Handbook of Greek Coinage Series, Volume 1], Lancaster/London, Classical Numismatic Group, 2018.
