= Third oath of office ceremony of Narendra Modi =

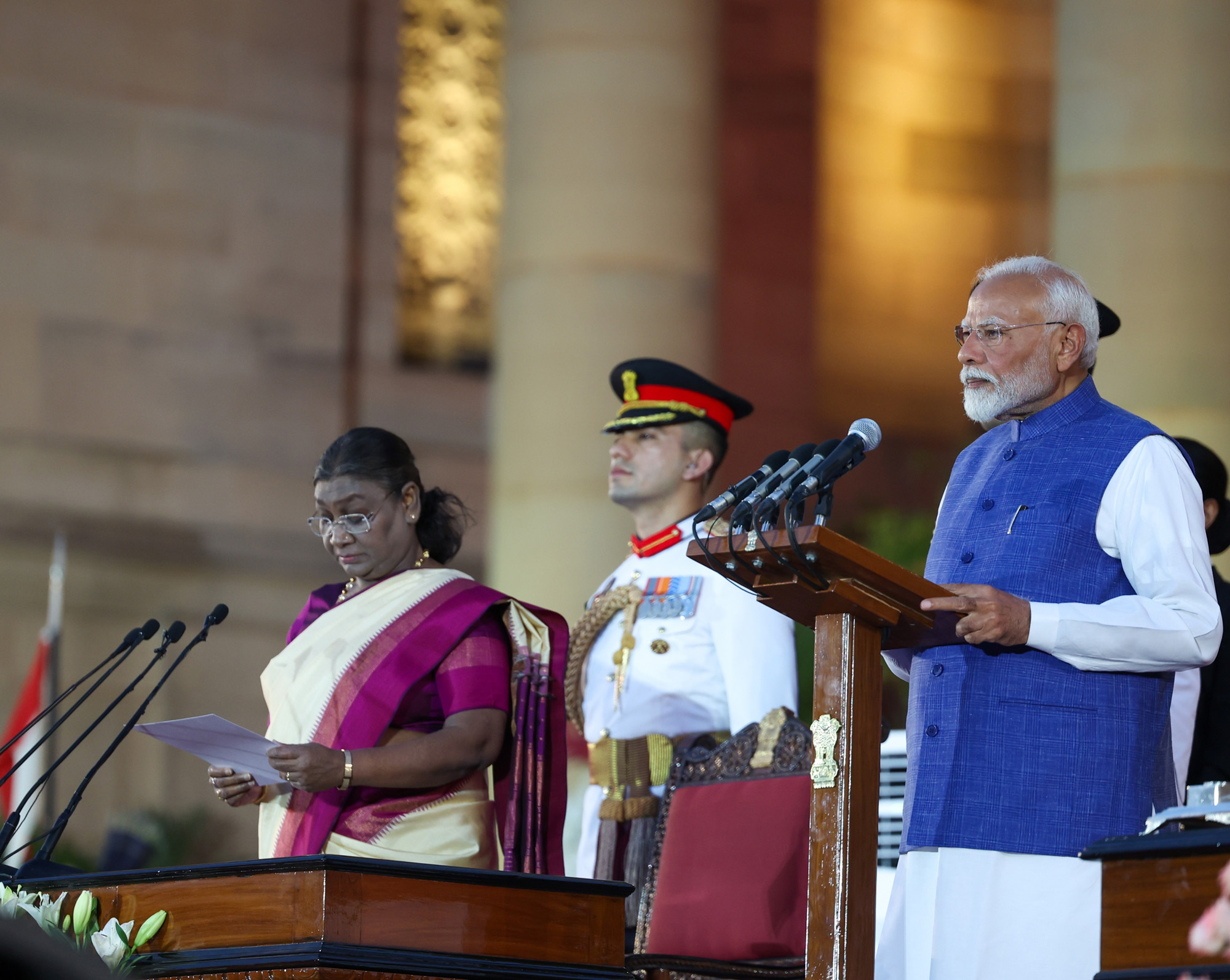
- Prime Minister of India, with President Droupadi Murmu administering the oath.
- Date: 9 June 2024; 2 years ago
- Location: Rashtrapati Bhavan, New Delhi, India; 28.6143°N 77.199°E
- Participants: Prime Minister of India, Narendra Modi; Third Modi ministry Assuming office President of India, Droupadi Murmu Administering oath

Narendra Modi was inaugurated for the third term as Prime Minister of India on 9 June 2024. The ceremony was held in the forecourt of Rashtrapati Bhavan. Along with Prime Minister Narendra Modi, 71 other members of the Third Modi ministry took the oath of office.

Oath of office

I, (name), do swear in the name of God (or, solemnly affirm) that I will bear true faith and allegiance to the Constitution of India as by law established, that I will uphold the sovereignty and integrity of India, that I will faithfully and conscientiously discharge my duties as a Prime Minister for the Union and that I will do right to all manner of people in accordance with the Constitution and the law, without fear or favour, afection or ill-will.

— Constitution of India, Third Schedule, Part I
Oath of secrecy

I, (name), do swear in the name of God (or, solemnly affirm) that I will not directly or indirectly communicate or reveal to any person or persons any matter which shall be brought under my consideration, or shall become known to me as a Prime Minister for the Union, except as may be required for the due discharge of my duties as Prime Minister.

— Constitution of India, Third Schedule, Part II

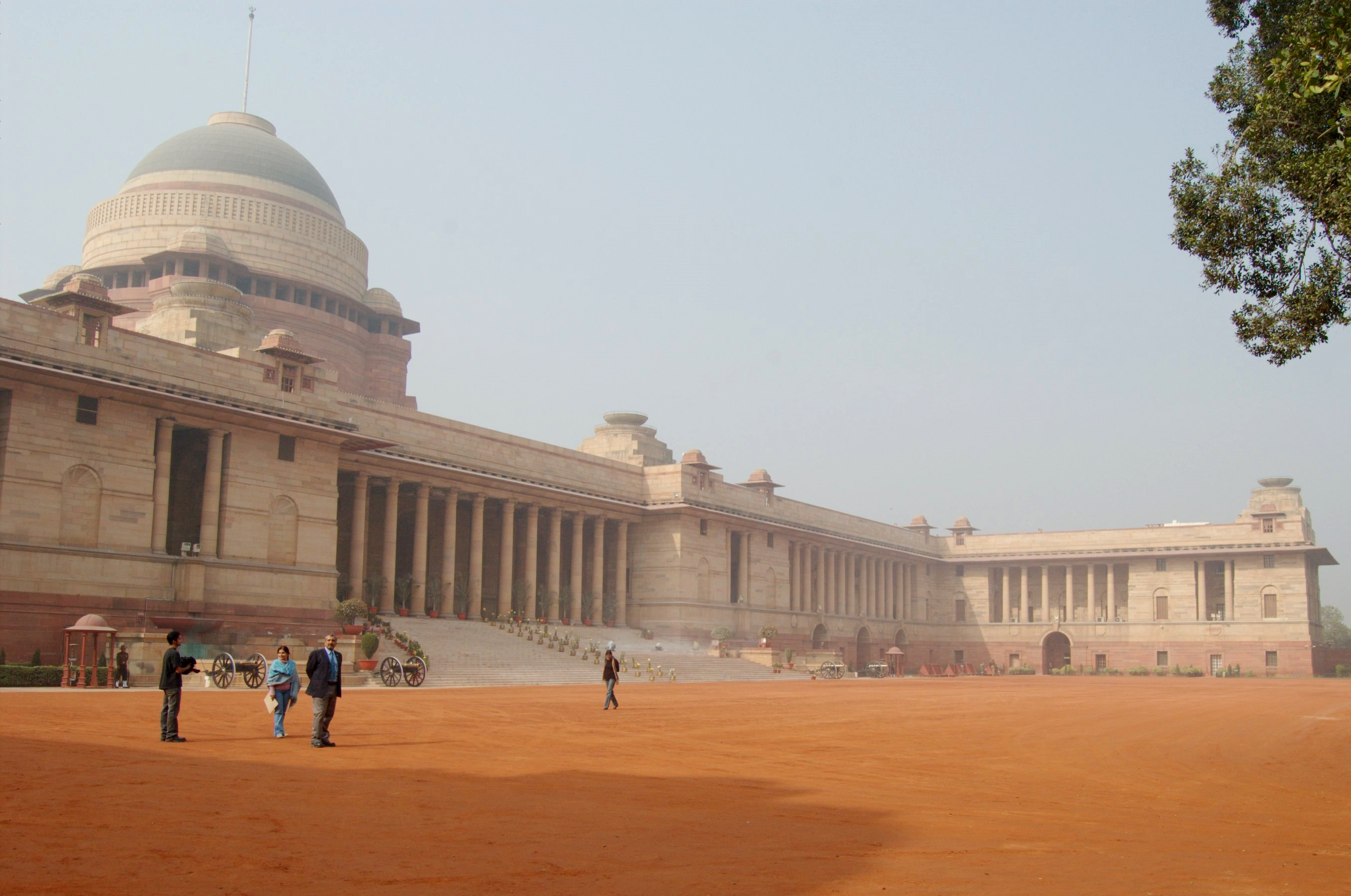
Forecourt of Rashtrapati Bhavan, the venue for Swearing-in ceremony.

== Background ==
BJP-led NDA won a majority in the lower house Lok Sabha after the 2024 Indian general election, winning 293 out of the 543 seats in Lok Sabha. After being elected as the Leader of the House in Lok Sabha and prime minister candidate by the NDA parliamentary board on 7 June, Narendra Modi was invited by the President of India Droupadi Murmu to form the government along with his council of ministers.

== Invitees ==
- Bangladesh: Prime Minister Sheikh Hasina.
- Bhutan: Prime Minister Tshering Tobgay.
- Maldives: President Mohamed Muizzu.
- Mauritius: Prime Minister Pravind Jugnauth.
- Nepal: Prime Minister Pushpa Kamal Dahal.
- Seychelles: Vice President Ahmed Afif.
- Sri Lanka: President Ranil Wickremesinghe.

== See also ==
- Premiership of Narendra Modi
