= 2009 Union budget of India =

Government budget

2009 Union Budget of India
- Emblem of India
- Submitted: 6 July 2009
- Submitted by: Pranab Mukherjee
- Presented: 6 July 2009
- Passed: 10 August 2009
- Parliament: 15th (Lok Sabha)
- Party: Indian National Congress
- Finance minister: Pranab Mukherjee
- Total revenue: ₹6.19 trillion (US$73 billion) ▲(23.4%)
- Total expenditures: ₹10.20 trillion (US$120 billion) ▲(23.4%)
- Deficit: 0.57%
- Website: indiabudget.nic.in

The 2009 Union budget of India was presented by the finance minister, Pranab Mukherjee, on 6 July 2009.

== Background ==
During 2008–09, the growth rate of GDP of India fell from an average of over 9% in the previous three fiscal years to 6.7%. The wholesale price index of India also witnessed large fluctuations between 13% in August 2008 to 0% in March 2009. The fiscal deficit of Indian government had gone up to 6.1% in March 2009. The budget was preceded by an interim budget by Pranab Mukherjee on 16 Feb 2009.

== Budget Estimates ==
The total estimated expenditure for 2009–10 was ₹10,20,838 crore, of which ₹6,95,689 crore was towards Non Plan and ₹3,25,149 crore towards Plan expenditure. Total estimated revenue was ₹6,19,842 crore, including revenue receipts of ₹6,14,497 and capital receipts of ₹5345 crores, excluding borrowings. The resulting fiscal deficit was ₹4,00,996 crore while revenue deficit was ₹2,82,735 crore. The gross tax receipts were budgeted at ₹6,41,079 crore and non-tax revenue receipts at ₹1,40,279.

== Short term economic revival measures ==
=== Infrastructure development ===
- Allocation of ₹15,800 crore to National Highways Authority of India.
- Allocation of ₹12,887090 crore to Jawaharlal Nehru National Urban Renewal Mission.
- Allocation of ₹3,973 crore for housing and provision of basic amenities to urban poor.
- Allocation of ₹500 crore for Brihan Mumbai Storm Water Drainage Project .
- Allocation of ₹2,080 crore for Accelerated Power Development and Reform Programme

=== Agriculture development ===
- Allocation of ₹411 crore for interest subvention for short term crop loans .
- Extension of time given to the farmers to pay their overdues under Debt Waiver and Debt Relief Scheme to 31 December 2009.
- Allocation under Accelerated Irrigation Benefit Programme (AIBP) increased by 75% over B.E. 2008–09.
- Allocation under Rashtriya Krishi Vikas Yojana (RKVY) stepped up by 30% in B.E. 2009–10 over B.E. 2008–09.

=== Export growth restoration ===
- Allocation of ₹ 124 crore for Market Development Assistance Scheme
- Extension of deadline for Interest subvention of 2% on pre-shipment credit for employment oriented export sectors to 31 March 2010.

== Medium term economic revival measures ==
- Setting up of an expert group to advise on pricing petroleum products in sync with global prices.
- Raising of the threshold for non-promoter public shareholding for listed companies.
- Setting up of State Level Bankers Committee for providing banking facilities in under-banked/unbanked areas in the next three years.

== Inclusive development measures ==
- Allocation of ₹39,100 crore to National Rural Employment Guarantee Scheme
- National Food Security Act to be brought in to ensure entitlement of 25 kilo of rice or wheat per month at ₹3 per kilo to every family living below the poverty line in rural or urban areas.
- Allocation of ₹12,000 crore to Pradhan Mantri Gram Sadak Yojana and ₹7,000 crore to Rajiv Gandhi Grameen Vidyutikaran Yojana.
- Allocation of ₹8,800 crore to Indira Awaas Yojana and ₹2,000 crore to Rural Housing Fund
- Allocation of ₹100 crore to Pradhan Mantri Adarsh Gram Yojana.
- Interest subsidy to poor households to be provided for loans up to ₹1 lakh.
- Increase of Corpus of Rashtriya Mahila Kosh from ₹100 crore to ₹500
- National Mission for Female Literacy to be launched with the aim to reduce level of female illiteracy by half in three years.
- Full interest subsidy for student loans during the period of moratorium introduced for approved courses of study in technical and professional streams from recognised institutions in India
- Plan outlay of Ministry of Minority Affairs enhanced to ₹1,740 crore.
- ₹75 corers allocated for establishing three campuses for Aligarh Muslim University
- Setting up of handloom mega clusters in West Bengal and Tamil Nadu, powerloom mega cluster in Rajasthan and mega clusters for carpets in Srinagar and Mirzapur
- Allocation of ₹12,070 crore to National Rural Health Mission
- Launching of eight national missions under National Action Plan on Climate Change.
- Setting up of National Ganga River Basin Authority and allocation of ₹562 crore for River and Lake Conservation Plans.
- One-time grant of ₹100 crore for Indian Council of Forestry Research and Education, Dehradun

== Building Accountable Institutions ==
- Unique Identification Authority of India to set up online data base with identity and biometric details of Indian residents.
- ₹430 crore provided to modernise police machinery in the States.
- ₹2,284 crore proposed for construction of fences, roads, flood lights on the international borders.
- 1 lakh dwelling units for housing of Central Para-military Forces personnel to be made.
- Increase of pension for servicemen at a cost of ₹2,100 crore.
- ₹495 crore allocated to setting up and upgrading of polytechnics.
- ₹827 crore allocated for opening one Central University in each uncovered State.
- ₹50 crore allocated for Punjab University, Chandigarh
- Outlay for Commonwealth Games 2010 increased to ₹3,472 crore.
- ₹500 crore allocated for rehabilitation of Sri Lankan Tamils.
- ₹2,113 crore allocated for IITs and NITs
- ₹1,000 crore allocated rebuilding the damaged infrastructure caused due to cyclone Aila in West Bengal.

== Taxation ==
The tax proposals on direct taxes were claimed to be revenue neutral while those on indirect taxes were claimed to yield a net gain of ₹2,000 crore in a year.

=== Direct taxes ===
- Increase of personal income tax exemption limit from ₹2.25 lakh to ₹2.40 lakh for senior citizens, from ₹1.80 lakh to ₹1.90 lakh for women tax payers and from ₹1.50 lakh to ₹1.60 lakh for all other categories of individual taxpayers.
- Increase of the deduction under section 80-DD to ₹1 lakh from ₹75,000.
- Elimination of surcharge of 10% on personal income tax
- Extension of deduction in respect of export profits under sections 10A and 10B of the Income-tax Act till 2010–11.
- Abolition of Fringe Benefit Tax
- Extension of weighted deduction of 150% on in-house R&D expenditure to all manufacturing businesses.
- Increase of Minimum Alternate Tax from 10% of book profits to 15%.
- Exemption of income of the National Pension Scheme Trust from income tax and any dividend paid to this Trust from dividend distribution tax
- Abolition of Commodity Transaction Tax introduced in The Finance Act, 2008.
- Extension of the tax holiday under section 80-IB(9) to profits derived from the commercial production of mineral oil and natural gas from oil and gas blocks awarded under the New Exploration Licensing Policy-VIII round of bidding.

=== Indirect taxes ===
- Imposition of 5% basic customs duty to imported set top boxes
- Reduction of basic customs duty of LCD panel from 10% to 5%.
- Extension of CVD exemption of 4% for components of mobile phones.
- Reduction of customs duty from 10% to 5% for life saving drugs.
- Reduction of customs duty from 7.5% to 5% for life saving devices used in treatment of heart conditions.
- Increase of customs duty from ₹100 to ₹200 per ten grams for gold bars, from ₹250 to ₹500 per ten grams for gold jewellery and from ₹500 to ₹1000 per kg for silver.

=== Central excise duties ===
- Restoring the ad valorem central excise duty of 4% for cotton textiles beyond the fibre stage.
- Reduction of basic customs duty on wool waste and cotton waste from 15% to 10%.
- Increase of central excise duty rates for items attracting the rate of 4% to a mean rate of 8% with exceptions like food items and drugs.
- Reduction of basic customs duty on bio-diesel from 7.5% to 2.5%
- Full exemption to such goods manufactured at site for construction industry, when used for further construction at site.
- Reduction of ad valorem duty for vehicles of engine capacity above 2000 cc to ₹15,000 from ₹20,000.
- Reduction of excise duty for Petrol driven trucks from 20% to 8%.
- Exemption of branded jewellery from excise duty.

=== Service tax ===
- Exemption of service tax on the membership and other fees collected by Federation of Indian Export Organisations.
- Extension of service tax to goods carried by Indian Railways and those carried as coastal cargo or through inland waterways
- Extension of service tax on advice, consultancy or technical assistance provided in the field of law.
- Exemption of service tax for private enterprises transporting passengers in vehicles having ‘Contract Carriage Permits’

== Reactions ==
=== Political parties ===
Bharatiya Janata Party (BJP) president Rajnath Singh criticised the budget, claiming that the government failed to fulfil the people's expectations. BJP leader Venkaiah Naidu described the Budget as "escapist" and alleged that no steps were taken to attract investment or to provide relief for farmers. Communist Party of India (Marxist) (CPM) leader Brinda Karat termed the Budget as pro-rich and claimed that there were no major allocations in health, education and food subsidy. Communist Party of India (CPI) leader Gurudas Dasgupta criticised the projected economic growth as 'utopian'. RJD chief Lalu Prasad Yadav described the Budget as balanced but criticised it for not providing funds for reconstruction of Bihar following the floods in Kosi.

=== Industry ===
The Confederation of Indian Industry welcomed the budget, claiming that many of their recommendations were implemented. NASSCOM also welcomed the initiatives like modernisation of employment exchanges, the UIAD project, and smart cards for healthcare services. Sudip Nandy, CEO of Aricent lauded the one-year extension granted to the tax holiday scheme and the abolition of Fringe Benefit Tax and double taxation on the packaged software. D Sucheth Rao of Neuland Laboratories claimed that the government has largely ignored the demands of the Pharma segment.

=== Share market ===
Sensex, the benchmark index of the Bombay Stock Exchange, reacted adversely to the budget, falling over 869 points, a loss of 6.53%, the biggest fall on any budget day. And the CNX Nifty index of the National Stock Exchange fell by 258 points. The biggest impact was on banking stocks, with the sectoral index losing 8.17%

== See also ==
- Dream Budget
