= 2024 Union budget of India =

Government budget

2024 Union Budget of India
Annual Financial Statement of the Central Government for the year 2024–25 The Finance Bill, 2024
- Emblem of India
- Submitted: 23 July 2024
- Submitted by: Nirmala Sitharaman (Minister of Finance)
- Submitted to: Parliament of India
- Presented: 23 July 2024
- Parliament: 18th (Lok Sabha)
- Government: Third Modi ministry
- Party: Bharatiya Janata Party
- Finance minister: Nirmala Sitharaman
- Total revenue: ₹31.29 trillion (US$370 billion)
- Total expenditures: ₹48.21 trillion (US$570 billion)
- Tax cuts: Numerous
- Deficit: 4.9% of GDP(Target)
- Debt: 57.1% of GDP
- GDP: 3.937 Trillion
- Website: www.indiabudget.gov.in

The 2024 Union Budget of India was presented by Finance Minister, Nirmala Sitharaman on 23 July 2024. This was the first budget of Narendra Modi led NDA government's third term.

== History ==
The Union Budget is the annual financial report of India; an estimate of income and expenditure of the government on a periodical basis. As per Article 112 of the Indian Constitution, it is a compulsory task of the government. The first budget of India was presented on 18 February 1860 by Scotsman James Wilson. The first Union Budget of Independent India was presented by R. K. Shanmukham Chetty on 26 November 1947.

== Tax changes ==
=== Revised income tax slabs ===
The income tax (IT) slabs have been revised under the new income tax regime. The updated tax rates are as follows:

Tax Rate	Slab before budget	Slab after budget
Nil	Up to Rs 3 lakh	Up to Rs 3 lakh
5%	Rs 3 lakh to Rs 6 lakh	Rs 3 lakh to Rs 7 lakh
10%	Rs 6 lakh to Rs 9 lakh	Rs 7 lakh to Rs 10 lakh
15%	Rs 9 lakh to Rs 12 lakh	Rs 10 lakh to Rs 12 lakh
20%	Rs 12 lakh to Rs 15 lakh	Rs 12 lakh to Rs 15 lakh
30%	Above Rs 15 lakh	Above Rs 15 lakh

Standard deduction has been increased from 50,000 to 75,000. Ernst & Young estimates that, following standard tax deduction polices, income of upto 7.75 lakh is extempted from income tax after introduction of the increase in standard deduction.

=== Angel tax ===
The government has abolished the "angel tax," a levy that was introduced in the Finance Act of 2012. This tax applied to investments received by unlisted companies that exceeded the fair market value of their shares, often affecting start-ups and early-stage companies.

=== Capital gains tax ===
The capital gains tax structure has also undergone changes:

- Short-Term Capital Gains (STCG): The tax rate on short-term capital gains from shares, mutual funds, and real estate has been increased from 15% to 20%.
- Long-Term Capital Gains (LTCG): The tax rate on long-term capital gains has been set at 12.5%. Additionally, the exemption limit for long-term capital gains has been raised from ₹1 lakh to ₹1.25 lakh.

=== Tax Deducted at Source ===
The government has proposed a reduction in the rate of Tax Deducted at Source (TDS) for various types of payments. Specifically:

- The TDS rate for insurance commission, life insurance policy payments, rent payments, and commission or brokerage payments is proposed to be decreased from 5% to 2%.
- The TDS rate on payments made by e-commerce operators to e-commerce participants for the sale of goods or services is set to be reduced from 1% to 0.1%.

The Secretary of Revenue, Sanjay Malhotra said that the decrease in TDS is aimed at simplifying TDS compliance.

== Ministerial allocations of total expenditure ==
The total expenditure, encompassing both revenue and capital outlays, was distributed among various ministries. The Finance Ministry received the largest share at 38.5%, while the Defence Ministry held the second position with an allocation of 12.9%.

Ministry	Total Expenditure ('Crores)	Total Expenditure %
Ministry of Finance	₹ 1,858,159	38.547%
Ministry of Defence	₹ 621,941	12.902%
Ministry of Road Transport and Highways	₹ 278,000	5.767%
Ministry of Railways	₹ 255,393	5.298%
Ministry of Consumer Affairs, Food and Public Distribution	₹ 223,323	4.633%
Ministry of Home Affairs	₹ 219,643	4.556%
Ministry of Rural Development	₹ 180,233	3.739%
Ministry of Chemicals and Fertilisers	₹ 168,500	3.495%
Ministry of Communications	₹ 137,294	2.848%
Ministry of Agriculture and Farmers Welfare	₹ 132,470	2.748%
Ministry of Education	₹ 120,628	2.502%
Ministry of Jal Shakti	₹ 98,714	2.048%
Ministry of Health and Family Welfare	₹ 90,959	1.887%
Ministry of Housing and Urban Affairs	₹ 82,577	1.713%
Ministry of Women and Child Development	₹ 26,092	0.541%
Department of Atomic Energy	₹ 24,969	0.518%
Ministry of Labour and Employment	₹ 22,531	0.467%
Ministry of External Affairs	₹ 22,155	0.460%
Ministry of Micro, Small and Medium Enterprises	₹ 22,138	0.459%
Ministry of Electronics and Information Technology	₹ 21,937	0.455%
Ministry of Power	₹ 20,502	0.425%
Ministry of New and Renewable Energy	₹ 19,100	0.396%
Ministry of Science and Technology	₹ 16,628	0.345%
Ministry of Petroleum and Natural Gas	₹ 15,930	0.330%
Ministry of Social Justice and Empowerment	₹ 14,225	0.295%
Department of Space	₹ 13,043	0.271%
Ministry of Tribal Affairs	₹ 13,000	0.270%
Ministry of Commerce and Industry	₹ 11,469	0.238%
Ministry of Heavy Industries	₹ 7,242	0.150%
Ministry of Fisheries, Animal Husbandry and Dairying	₹ 7,138	0.148%
Ministry of Law and Justice	₹ 6,788	0.141%
Ministry of Development of North Eastern Region	₹ 5,900	0.122%
Ministry of Statistics and Programme Implementation	₹ 5,454	0.113%
Ministry of Skill Development and Entrepreneurship	₹ 4,520	0.094%
Ministry of Textiles	₹ 4,417	0.092%
Ministry of Information and Broadcasting	₹ 4,343	0.090%
Ministry of AYUSH	₹ 3,712	0.077%
Ministry of Youth Affairs and Sports	₹ 3,442	0.071%
Ministry of Environment, Forests and Climate Change	₹ 3,330	0.069%
Ministry of Food Processing Industries	₹ 3,290	0.068%
Ministry of Culture	₹ 3,261	0.068%
Ministry of Minority Affairs	₹ 3,183	0.066%
Ministry of Earth Sciences	₹ 3,065	0.064%
Ministry of Corporate Affairs	₹ 2,667	0.055%
Ministry of Tourism	₹ 2,480	0.051%
Ministry of Personnel, Public Grievances and Pensions	₹ 2,380	0.049%
Ministry of Ports, Shipping and Waterways	₹ 2,377	0.049%
Ministry of Civil Aviation	₹ 2,357	0.049%
Ministry of Mines	₹ 1,941	0.040%
The President, Parliament, Union Public Service Commission and the Secretariat of the Vice President	₹ 1,885	0.039%
Ministry of Panchayati Raj	₹ 1,184	0.025%
Ministry of Cooperation	₹ 1,183	0.025%
Ministry of Planning	₹ 837	0.017%
Ministry of Steel	₹ 326	0.007%
Ministry of Coal	₹ 193	0.004%
Ministry of Parliamentary Affairs	₹ 64	0.001%
Total	₹ 4,820,512	100%

== See also ==
- Union budget of India
- 2024 Interim-Union budget of India
