= Parakala =

Parakala is an Indian Telugu surname.

== People ==
- Kumar Parakala - Indian-American business executive.
- Parakala Prabhakar (born 2 January 1959) is an Indian political economist and social commentator

== Other ==
- Bramhatantra Swatantra Parakala Matha, commonly known as Parakala Matha, is a Vaishnava monastery
