= Military budget of India =

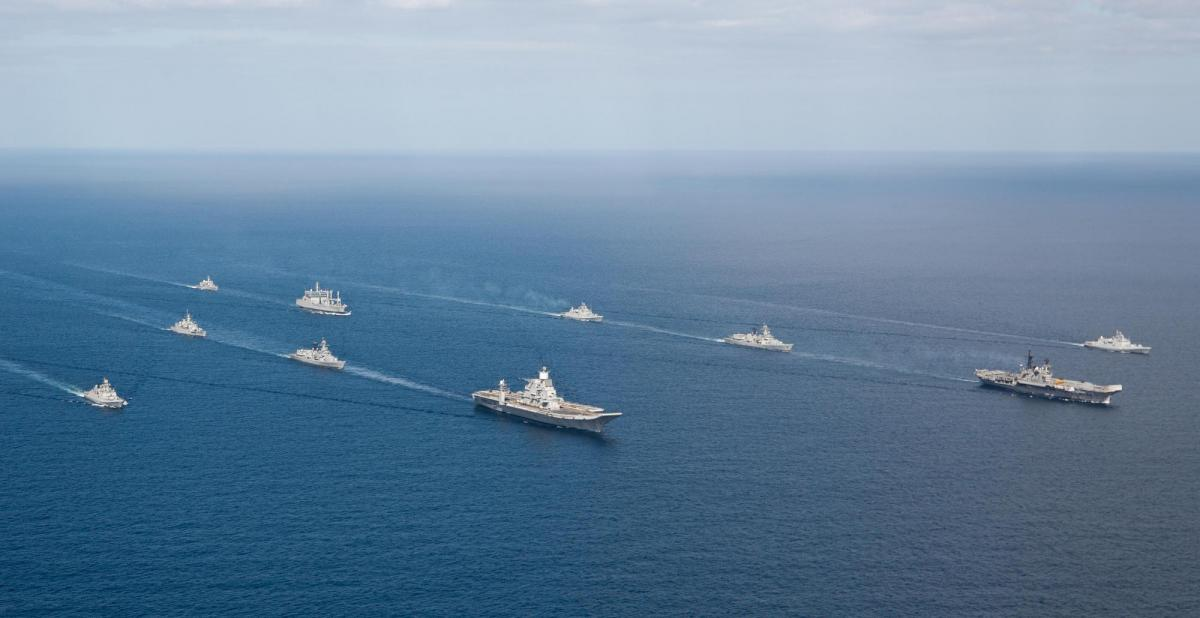
Indian Navy carrier battle group in transit led by aircraft carrier INS Vikramaditya

The military budget or defence budget of India is the portion of the overall budget of Union budget of India that is allocated for the funding of the Indian Armed Forces. The military budget finances employee salaries and training costs, maintenance of equipment and facilities, support of new or ongoing operations, and development and procurement of new technologies, weapons, equipment, and vehicles.

The Indian Army accounts for more than half of the total defence budget of India, with most of the expenditure going to the maintenance of cantonments, salaries and pensions, rather than critical arms and ammunition.

== Overview ==
India's defence budget includes allocation for the three defence services: the army, navy and air force. It also includes allocation for the ordnance factories, research and development, and capital outlay. Additionally there are civil defence expenditures such as pensions. Unofficial expenditure includes expenses for four of the six Central Armed Police Forces responsible for border security. The space program and atomic energy are funded separately.

India's official and unofficial defence allocation
Official status	Category or Demand for Grants (DFGs)		DCE/DSE
Unofficial	Ministry of Defence (Canteen Store Department, MOD Secretariat, Coast Guard, J&K Light Infantry)		Defence Civil (DCE)
Unofficial	Pensions and other benefits		Defence Civil (DCE)
Official defence budget	Operating expenses	Army (including the National Cadet Corps (NCC), Director General of Quality Assurance (DGQA), Military Farms and Ex-Servicemen Contributory Health Scheme)	Defence Services (DSE)
Official defence budget	Operating expenses	Navy (Joint Staff)	Defence Services (DSE)
Official defence budget	Operating expenses	Air Force	Defence Services (DSE)
Official defence budget	Operating expenses	Ordnance Factories	Defence Services (DSE)
Official defence budget	Operating expenses	Defence Research and Development Organisation (DRDO)	Defence Services (DSE)
Official defence budget	Capital expense	Capital outlay (Capital expenditure of all services including the NCC, Ordnance Factories and DGQA)	Defence Services (DSE)
Unofficial	Border Roads Organisation, Assam Rifles, Border Security Force, Indo-Tibetan Border Police, Sashastra Seema Bal, border management, CAPF construction, border outposts		

== Expenditures ==
Budget v Strength (2025-26) IA · IN · IAF · ICG · DRDO
Service	Budget (%)	Strength (%)
Army	61.7	83.1
Navy	11.3	4.52
Air Force	16.0	9.38
ICG	2.8	0.74
DRDO	7.9	1.2

Share of military services in defence budget in 2020–2021:
1. Army (56.0%)
2. Navy (15.0%)
3. Air Force (23.0%)
4. DRDO (6.00%)

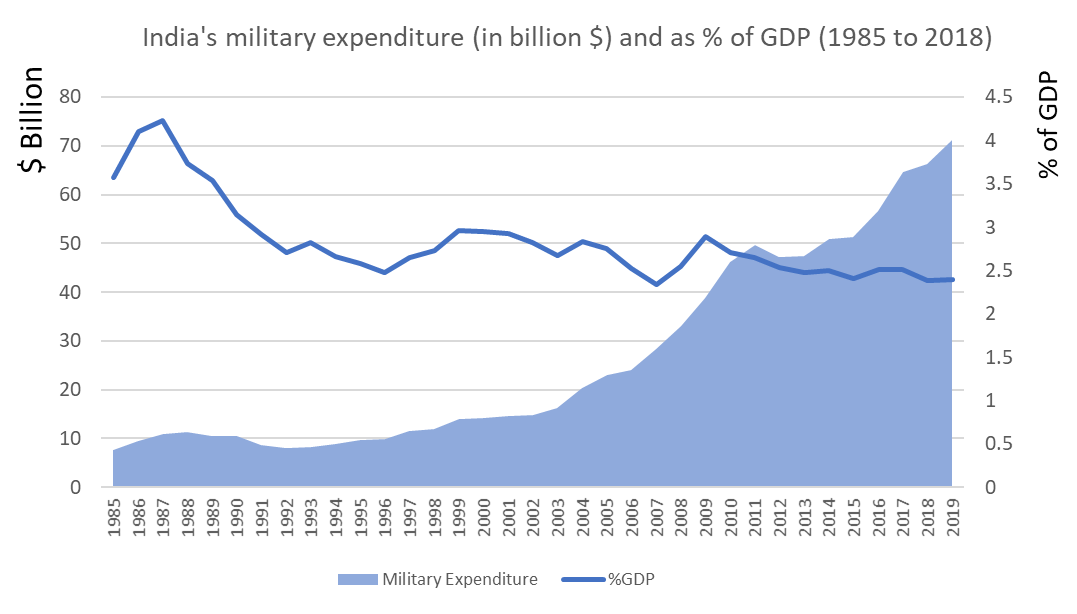
Military expenditure in billion US$ and as % of GDP, 1985–2018 (data via World Bank and SIPRI)

=== 2017–2018 ===
The Minister of Finance allocated ₹359,000 crore (equivalent to ₹5.0 trillion or US$53 billion in 2023) of the 2017 Union budget of India for the development of the armed forces, marking a raise of around 7% from the previous fiscal year.

=== 2018–2019 ===
In presenting the defence budget of 2018–2019, the Finance Minister allocated ₹404,365 crore (equivalent to ₹5.4 trillion or US$57 billion in 2023) for the Ministry of Defence (MOD). This translates into an increase of 5.66% over the 2017–2018 defence budget.

=== 2019–2020 ===
As 2019 was an election year the National Democratic Alliance (NDA) government presented an interim budget in place of a regular budget as per the general practice. In the interim budget an allocation of ₹431,011 crore (equivalent to ₹5.4 trillion or US$57 billion in 2023) was made. On its re-election the NDA government kept the military budget unchanged. However the actual expenditure exceeded the estimated amount and final defence spending for 2019–2020 stood at ₹448,820 crore (equivalent to ₹5.6 trillion or US$59 billion in 2023), marking an increase of around 10% over the previous budget.

=== 2020–2021 ===
The allocation for defence during the fiscal year 2020–2021 stood at ₹471,378 crore (equivalent to ₹5.5 trillion or US$59 billion in 2023). This amounted to an increase of nearly 9%.

=== 2021–2022 ===
The allocation for defence during the fiscal year 2021–2022 was ₹478,196 crore (equivalent to ₹5.4 trillion or US$57 billion in 2023), an increase of 1% over the previous year.

=== 2022–2023 ===
The allocation for defence during the fiscal year 2022–2023 stood at ₹525,166 crore (equivalent to ₹5.6 trillion or US$59 billion in 2023), an increase of nearly 10% over the previous year. making it the fourth highest in the world after the US, China, and Russia.

=== 2023–2024 ===
The defence expenditure for fiscal year 2023–2024 stood at ₹593,538 crore (US$63 billion).

=== 2024–2025 ===
The defence budget of India was increased to ₹621,940 crore (US$66 billion) in the 2024-2025 union budget from ₹593,538 crore (US$63 billion) during last year. This year’s defence budget accounts for 1.89% of the country’s projected gross domestic product (GDP) for 2024-25.

=== 2025–2026 ===
The defence budget of India was ₹6.81 lakh crore (US$72 billion) This year’s defence budget accounts for 1.9% of the country’s projected gross domestic product (GDP) for 2025-26, with a 9.5% increase from last year, with a significant portion allocated to salaries and pensions, and a focus on domestic procurement and modernization.

=== Statistics ===
Table 1: Budget allocation for armed forces
Major Head	Actuals (2023-24)	RE (2024-25)	BE (2025-26)	% Change (2024-25 v 2025-26)
Salaries	₹172,496 crore (US$18 billion)	₹172,760 crore (US$18 billion)	₹177,923 crore (US$19 billion)	▲3%
Capital Outlay	₹164,559 crore (US$17 billion)	₹170,485 crore (US$18 billion)	₹192,388 crore (US$20 billion)	▲13%
Pensions	₹142,093 crore (US$15 billion)	₹157,681 crore (US$17 billion)	₹160,795 crore (US$17 billion)	▲2%
Maintenance	₹87,722 crore (US$9.3 billion)	₹86,191 crore (US$9.1 billion)	₹90,923 crore (US$9.6 billion)	▲5%
Other Expenses	₹42,634 crore (US$4.5 billion)	₹53,943 crore (US$5.7 billion)	₹59,181 crore (US$6.3 billion)	▲10%
Total	₹609,504 crore (US$64 billion)	₹641,060 crore (US$68 billion)	₹681,210 crore (US$72 billion)	▲6%

Table 2: Budget allocation for armed forces
Major Head	Actuals (2023-24)	RE (2024-25)	BE (2025-26)	% Change (2024-25 v 2025-26)
Army Revenue	₹315,849 crore (US$33 billion)	₹335,295 crore (US$35 billion)	₹351,345 crore (US$37 billion)	▲5%
Navy Revenue	₹45,420 crore (US$4.8 billion)	₹48,320 crore (US$5.1 billion)	₹52,290 crore (US$5.5 billion)	▲8%
Air Force Revenue	₹66,803 crore (US$7.1 billion)	₹65,744 crore (US$7.0 billion)	₹71,254 crore (US$7.5 billion)	▲8%
Capital Outlay	₹144,259 crore (US$15 billion)	₹148,386 crore (US$16 billion)	₹168,565 crore (US$18 billion)	▲14%
Other	₹37,173 crore (US$3.9 billion)	₹43,315 crore (US$4.6 billion)	₹37,756 crore (US$4.0 billion)	▼13%
Total	₹609,504 crore (US$64 billion)	₹641,060 crore (US$68 billion)	₹681,210 crore (US$72 billion)	▲6%
Note: Army includes Jammu and Kashmir Light Infantry; Navy includes Coast Guard. Capital Outlay includes capital spending on Coast Guard. RE = Revised Estimate, BE = Budget Estimate. Sources: Expenditure Budget, Union Budget 2025-26; PRS.

=== Spending as a percentage of GDP ===
Year	Ruling coalition	Expenditure (%)	Change
2025	National Democratic Alliance	1.90	0.01▲
2024	National Democratic Alliance	1.89	0.08▼
2023	National Democratic Alliance	1.97	0.24▼
2022	National Democratic Alliance	2.21	0.45▼
2021	National Democratic Alliance	2.66	0.22▼
2020	National Democratic Alliance	2.88	0.36▲
2019	National Democratic Alliance	2.52	0.10▲
2018	National Democratic Alliance	2.42	0.09▼
2017	National Democratic Alliance	2.51	0.00
2016	National Democratic Alliance	2.51	0.10▲
2015	National Democratic Alliance	2.41	0.09▼
2014	National Democratic Alliance	2.50	0.03▲
2013	United Progressive Alliance	2.47	0.07▼
2012	United Progressive Alliance	2.54	0.11▼
2011	United Progressive Alliance	2.65	0.06▼
2010	United Progressive Alliance	2.71	0.18▼
2009	United Progressive Alliance	2.89	0.34▲
2008	United Progressive Alliance	2.55	0.21▲
2007	United Progressive Alliance	2.34	0.18▼

The above statistics were collected by the World Bank up to 2018.

=== Capital acquisition ===
Service	BE 2013–2014 (₹ in crore)	RE 2013–2014 (₹ in crore)	Under/over spending (₹ in crore)	Under/over spending (%)	Interim 2014–2015 (₹ in crore)	% growth of interim 2014–2015 over BE 2013–2014
Army	23,423.23	10,871.22	2,525.82	18.95	20,920.20	56.83▲
Navy	19,972.78	19,234.32	3,614.47	15.39	23,020.86	1.95▼
Air Force	37,048.06	36,016.54	1,031.52	2.78	31,817.89	14.12▼
Total	73,853.88	66,682.07	7,171.81	9.71	75,758.95	2.55▲

The above data was published by the Institute for Defence Studies and Analyses.

== See also ==
- Union budget of India
- Railway budget of India
