= 2022 Union budget of India =

Government budget

2022 Union Budget of India
- Emblem of India
- Submitted: 1 February 2022
- Submitted by: Nirmala Sitharaman (Minister of Finance)
- Submitted to: Parliament of India
- Presented: 1 February 2022
- Passed: 29 March 2022
- Country: India
- Parliament: 17th (Lok Sabha)
- Party: Bharatiya Janata Party
- Finance minister: Nirmala Sitharaman
- Total revenue: ▲₹31.94 trillion (US$330 billion)
- Total expenditures: ▲₹39.45 trillion (US$410 billion)
- Tax cuts: None
- Deficit: 6.4% ▼(0.3%)
- Website: www.indiabudget.gov.in

The 2022 Union Budget of India was presented by the Minister of Finance Nirmala Sitharaman on 1 February 2022, as her fourth budget. This is the third budget of Narendra Modi-led NDA government's second term. The Economic Survey for 2021–2022 was released on 31 January 2022, a day before the budget.

== History ==
The Union Budget is the annual financial report of India; an estimate of income and expenditure of the government on a periodical basis. As per Article 112 of the Indian Constitution, it is a compulsory task of the government. The first budget of India was presented on 18 February 1860 by Scotsman James Wilson. The first Union Budget of Independent India was presented by RK Shanmukham Chetty on 26 November 1947.

== Announcement ==
In the 2023-24 Union Budget, the healthcare sector receives ₹89,155 crore, a 13% increase from the previous year's ₹79,145 crore allocation.
