= 2021 Union budget of India =

Government budget

2021 Union Budget of India
- Emblem of India
- Submitted: 1 February 2021
- Submitted by: Nirmala Sitharaman (Minister of Finance)
- Submitted to: Parliament of India
- Presented: 1 February 2021
- Passed: 17 March 2021
- Country: India
- Parliament: 17th (Lok Sabha)
- Party: Bharatiya Janata Party
- Finance minister: Nirmala Sitharaman
- Total revenue: ₹31.67 trillion (US$330 billion) ▲(23.4%)
- Total expenditures: ₹37.7 trillion (US$390 billion) ▲(1%)
- Tax cuts: None
- Deficit: ▼6.71%
- Website: www.indiabudget.gov.in

The 2021 Union Budget of India was presented by the Minister of Finance on 1 February 2021. The budget is the first one to be presented orally due to ongoing COVID pandemic.

== History ==
The Union Budget is the annual financial report of India; an estimate of income and expenditure of the government under the Indian Constitution; presenting a budget is a compulsory task of the government.

== Background ==
There was huge speculation that government may increase tax rates to decrease its fiscal deficit so, there was a dip in BSE Sensex after touching the 50,000 marks other than that many economic journals also suggested introducing a new tax on High net worth individuals. The demand in the Indian market was low and the unemployment rate was very high so, the Budget has to Increase both the demand and new jobs.

== Healthcare and wellbeing ==
The Government of India allocated Rs. 2,23,846 crore in this financial year which is increase of 137% from the previous financial year, of which 35,000 crore rupees is allocated for Covid-vaccines, 64,180 crore rupees is allocated for PM Aatma Nirbhar Swasth Bharat Yojana and other announcements are -

- 17,788 rural and 11,024 urban Health and Wellness Centers.
- 4 regional National Institutes for Virology
- 15 Health Emergency Operation Centers and 2 mobile hospitals
- Integrated public health labs in all districts and 3382 block public health units in 11 states
- Critical care hospital blocks in 602 districts and 12 central institutions
- Strengthening of the National Centre for Disease Control (NCDC), its 5 regional branches and 20 metropolitan health surveillance units
- Expansion of the Integrated Health Information Portal to all States/UTs to connect all public health labs
- 17 new Public Health Units and strengthening of 33 existing Public Health Units
- Regional Research Platform for WHO South-East Asia Region
- 9 Bio-Safety Level III laboratories
- Mission Poshan 2.0 for to improve nutritional outcomes

=== Universal Coverage of Water Supply ===
The Government of India pledged to allocate Rs. 2,87,000 crore in next 5 financial year for jal jeevan mission which will serve 2.86 crore household.

=== Swachch Bharat ===
Swachch Bharat mission 2.0 was launched and pledged to allocate RS. 2,87,000 crore in next financial year which will mainly focus on faecal sludge management, waste water treatment and Bio-remediation of all legacy dump sites.

=== Clean Air ===
The Government allocated Rs. 2,217 crore to tackle air pollution, for 42 urban centers with a million-plus population.

=== Scrapping Policy ===
The Government launched Voluntary vehicle scrapping policy, By this policy the Government will make automated fitness centers to identify old and unfit vehicles, the government will also give incentive to scrap those cars and buy new cars.

== Physical, Financial Capital and Infrastructure ==
=== Production linked incentive Scheme ===
Finance minister Nirmala Sitharaman pledged to Invest Rs. 1.97 Lakh crore in PLI Scheme for next 5 years in 13 sectors to promote Atmanirbhar Bharat and make India a Global manufacturing Hub.

=== Textiles ===
Mega Investment Textile Parks(MITRA) scheme is launched by Indian government to make 7 Textile parks in three years and attract investment in the textile sector.

=== Infrastructure ===
The National Infrastructure Pipeline is extended to 7400 Projects and focused on 3 areas to increase the funding

1. Creation of institutional structures.
2. Big thrust on monetizing assets.
3. Enhancing the share of capital expenditure.

=== Roads and Highways Infrastructure ===
The Ministry of Road Transport and Highways outlaid Rs. 1.18 lakh crore worth projects, which is highest and the Government of India is also going to make 3.3 lakh crore worth of Roads under Bharatmala Pariyojna .

=== Railway Infrastructure ===
Finance minister allocated Rs. 1.1 lakh crore of which Rs. 1.07 lakh crore is for capital spending, the government has planned make Indian Railways future Ready by 2030s, Electrify all Broad Gauge lines by December 2023, Add vistadome coaches in Tourist Routes, Use Indigenously developed automatic train protection system and proposed three new Dedicated freight corridors.

1. East Coast corridor from Kharagpur to Vijayawada.
2. East-West Corridor from Bhusaval to Kharagpur to Dankuni.
3. North-South corridor from Itarsi to Vijayawada.

== Announcements ==
=== Census ===
Nirmala Sitharaman confirmed in her budget speech that 2021 census will be first ever digital census in India. The Finance Minister allocated ₹ 3,768 crore for carrying out the census in 2021 Union budget of India.

=== Co-operatives ===
Sitharaman announced special provisions for the strengthening of cooperatives, which was ultimately taken up by setting up the Ministry of Co-operation.

== Reception ==
The market welcomed the budget. The BSE Sensex closed with over 5% gain, the highest gain since the "dream budget" of 1997.
