= 2019 Union budget of India =

Government budget

2019 Union Budget of India
- Emblem of India
- Submitted: 5 July 2019
- Submitted by: Nirmala Sitharaman, Finance Minister
- Country: India
- Party: Bharatiya Janata Party
- Website: Official website

The 2019 Union Budget of India was presented by Finance Minister, Nirmala Sitharaman on 5 July 2019, 11 am as her maiden budget. This was the first budget of Narendra Modi led NDA government second term.

== Major changes ==
The budget aimed at making the Indian economy of $5 trillion by 2025. Within infrastructure, the interlinking of highways project received the budget of ₹82,570 (US$860); which would boost the tier 2 & tier 3 city economies as well as of cement and steel. Importing of stone, branded furniture and construction machinery was taxed more; thus promoting Make in India. Duties on imported marble and ceramic tiles was increased by nearly 20%.

For the Har Ghar Jal i.e. piped water supply to all rural households by 2024, a budget of ₹9,150 (US$95) was allotted. On Ganga waterways, the budget mentioned plans to set up terminals at Sahibganj (Jharkhand) and Haldia. The National Ganga Plan and Ghat Works received a budget of ₹2,300 (US$24) and for National River Conservation Program a budget of ₹1,620 (US$17) was allotted. The Department of Agriculture Research and Education received a budget of ₹8,078 (US$84), which was just a minor increase by 1.5% from previous year. The fertilizer subsidy saw a major increase from ₹10,000 (US$100) to ₹80,000 (US$830).

For companies with total turnover of ₹4 billion (US$42 million), the corporate tax of 30% was reduced to 25%. For other companies, the tax would continue to remain at 30%.

The budget for the first time introduced a 10% import duty on newsprint. To boost Indian printing industry, a duty of 5% was also imposed on imported printed books. To boost electric vehicles, an income tax deduction of ₹1.5 (1.6¢ US) was introduced on loans taken to buy electric vehicles. The GST on EVs was also reduced from 12% to 5%.

== See also ==
- Union budget of India
- 2019 Interim-Union budget of India
