= Pradhan Mantri Adarsh Gram Yojana =

Indian rural development programme

Pradhan Mantri Adarsh Gram Yojana (PMAGY)
- Country: India
- Prime Minister(s): Manmohan Singh
- Launched: 2009–2010

Pradhan Mantri Adarsh Gram Yojana (PMAGY) is a rural development programme launched by the central government in India in the financial year 2009–10 for the development of villages having a higher ratio (over 50%) of people belonging to the scheduled castes through convergence of central and state schemes and allocating financial funding on a per village basis.

The plan is considered ambitious as it aims to bring a number of development programs to the villages. Some of these programs are Bharat Nirman, Pradhan Mantri Gram Sadak Yojana (PMGSY) for rural roads, water supply, housing, electrification and other big-ticket schemes like Sarva Shiksha Abhiyan, Mahatma Gandhi National Rural Employment Guarantee Act, Integrated Child Development Services, and sanitation. This program would be applicable to around 44,000 villages which had a scheduled castes population above 50% and so qualified for PMAGY.

== Political background ==
This Program was brought by the UPA coalition government supported by the left parties. The project was aimed at getting a larger political role in scheduled caste (dalit) politics and was thought of strengthening the votebank of UPA leaders in regions having a high dalit population. The program was considered beneficial by the Congress party as the scheme gave a direct role to Centre to develop dalits at the grassroots. Congress hoped to improve its election results in states such as Uttar Pradesh, Maharashtra, Punjab and Haryana which will have a large number of beneficiary villages.

== The plan ==
The Plan aims to build an "Adarsh Gram" (Model village) which has adequate physical and institutional infrastructure, in which minimum needs of all sections of the society are fully met. All the facilities necessary for dignified living should be available and the residents enabled to utilise their potential to the fullest.

Pradhanmantri Adarsh Gram Yojana was announced by the Finance Minister while presenting the Union Budget of India 2009–10. Pradhan Mantri Adarsh Gram Yojana (PMAGY) was formally launched in 18 B.B village in Sri Ganganagar district of Rajasthan on 23 July 2010. The scheme was launched by Union Social Justice and Empowerment Minister Mukul Wasnik with a reading of the Prime Minister's message emphasising that the scheme aims at integrated development of 1,000 villages, where a majority of the population belongs to the Scheduled Castes. The Government press release had mentioned five states Bihar, Rajasthan, Tamil Nadu, Himachal Pradesh (225 villages in each state) and Assam (100 villages) for the initial implementation of the program.

Pradhan Mantri Adarsh Gram Yojana(PMAGY) comes under the Ministry of Social Justice and Empowerment.

== Funding ==
In the launching phase the centre had allocated a sum of ₹555.4 million (US$5.9 million) to Assam, Bihar and Rajasthan. As a pilot project the program was implemented in 1,000 villages in Assam, Bihar, Himachal Pradesh, Rajasthan and Tamil Nadu with an allocation of ₹1 billion (US$11 million) with each village to get ₹1 million (US$11,000) per year.

In September 2011 the annual funding on the project was raised to ₹2 million (US$21,000) per village and ₹1.94 billion (US$21 million) had been spent in these villages till then. In the 12 Five Year Plan the government plans to cover 44,000 villages with an allocation of ₹5 million (US$53,000) to each villages.

== Implementation ==
The aim of the scheme is to integrated development of the selected villages so that they have all required physical and social infrastructure for an all round socio-economic development. Another objectives of the plan is elimination of disparity between SCs and other communities in terms of common socio-economic indicators such as literacy rate, completion rate of elementary education, infant mortality rate/maternal mortality rate and ownership of productive assets. To ensure the implementation two committees an advisory committee headed by the Deputy Chief Minister and a steering committee headed by the Chief Secretary have been formed.

== See also ==
- Sansad Adarsh Gram Yojana
- Mahatma Gandhi National Rural Employment Guarantee Act
- Sarva Shiksha Abhiyan
