= The Crooked Timber of New India =

2023 book

The Crooked Timber of New India: Essays on a Republic in Crisis is a book by Parakala Prabhakar which was published on May 5, 2023 by Speaking Tiger Books. It is mainly focused on the current state of the Indian republic. The title is derived from a quotation from philosopher Immanuel Kant: "Out of the crooked timber of humanity, no straight thing was ever made," from his 1784 essay "Idea for a Universal History with a Cosmopolitan Purpose.

== Critical reception ==
Pulapre Balakrishnan of The Hindu wrote "Parakala Prabhakar's book on the state of democracy in India is useful but ignores some pointers", Avijit Pathak of The Tribune wrote "I have no hesitation in saying that this book ought to be read by all those who dare to speak truth to power.". The book is also reviewed by Bibek Debroy of The Telegraph and Safwat Zargar of Scroll.in.
