= 2013 Union budget of India =

Government budget

2013 Union Budget of India
- Emblem of India
- Submitted: 28 February 2013
- Submitted by: P. Chidambaram, Finance Minister
- Country: India
- Party: INC
- Website: http://www.indiabudget.nic.in Official Site

The 2013 Union Budget of India was presented by Finance Minister, P. Chidambaram on 28 February 2013, 11 AM.

== Highlights ==
- Total expenditure of ₹1,658,000 crore (US$170 billion)
- Planned defence expenditure of ₹203,000 crore (US$21 billion)
- Education expenditure of ₹5,000 crore (US$520 million)
- ₹37,330 crore (US$3.9 billion) was allocated for Ministry of Health & Family Welfare in the financial year 2014.
- ₹3,511 crore (US$360 million) allocated to Minority Affairs Ministry.
- ₹4,727 crore (US$490 million) allocated for medical education and research.
- Allocation of ₹1,000 crore (US$100 million) for Nirbhaya Fund to empower women and increase their safety
- Setting up a National Institute for Sports to train coaches in Patiala Punjab at a cost of ₹2.5 billion (US$26 million)

=== Personal tax ===
- There would be surcharges on the super rich (10% above whose income exceeding ₹10 million (US$100,000) per year. It is also mentioned that this tax has been implied only for this financial year and may be withdrawn from next year onwards.
- No changes in personal income tax slabs. But a special redemption of Rs. 2,000 has been given for income group between Rs. 2 to 5 Lakhs.
