= 2011 Union budget of India =

Government budget

2011 Union Budget of India
- Emblem of India
- Submitted: 28 February 2011
- Submitted by: Pranab Mukherjee
- Country: India
- Website: indiabudget.nic.in

The 2011 Union Budget of India was presented by Pranab Mukherjee, the Finance Minister of India on 28 February 2011. This budgetary proposals came into effect from 1 April 2011 to 31 March 2012.

== Highlights ==
Some salient features:

- Individual income tax exempt slab increased from ₹ 160,000 to ₹ 180,000
- Overall social sector spending up by 17%, education spending up by 24%
- Direct transfer of subsidy for BPL people for kerosene and LPG. Other government provided subsidies on food, electricity to continue
- Allow foreign investment in SEBI-registered mutual funds
- Defence budget hiked to ₹1,640 billion (US$17 billion)
- FII investment in corporate bonds raised to US$40 billion
- Tax free bonds of ₹300 billion (US$3.1 billion) for infrastructure building in roadways, railways
- ₹60 billion (US$620 million) to Public sector banks to maintain CRAR (Capital to Risk Weighted Assets Ratio)
- Women SHG development fund to be set up
- Rural Infrastructure Development fund to be raised ₹180 billion (US$1.9 billion)
- ₹30 billion (US$310 million) to NABARD for textile development
- 15 mega food parks for vegetables
- ₹ 9 billion towards pulses, protein production
- 107 cold storage projects approved to minimise food wastage. Cold storage to be recognised as infrastructure sub-sector
- National Mission for Electric and Hybrid vehicle to be launched
- Self-assessment in customs to be introduced
- Seven mega leather clusters will be set up – Jodhpur to have handicraft mega cluster
- ₹1,608,070 million (US$17 billion) for food security. This forms 36 per cent of budget allocation
- ₹580 billion (US$6.0 billion) for various schemes on rural development
- Telecom connectivity to all panchayats
- Anganwadi workers will get higher remuneration of ₹ 3000 per month, ₹ 1500 for Anganwadi helpers
- ₹520,570 million (US$5.4 billion) allocated for education
- ₹210 billion (US$2.2 billion) for primary education to implement free and compulsory education for children
- ₹5 billion+ to various universities across the country
- ₹5 billion for National Skill Development Fund
- Eligibility of old age pension for BPL reduced to 60 years.
- Pension amount for people aged above 80 years increased to ₹ 500
- ₹10 billion (US$100 million) for Judiciary
- Caste based census will be carried out as a separate exercise in June 2011
- 80 years above will come under very senior citizen – a new category with tax exemption up to ₹ 500,000
- MAT increased to 18.5%
- Concessional excise duty of 10% for hybrid vehicles
- Customs duty on solar lanterns reduced to 5%
- 1% central excise duty on 130 items (previously exempted from central excise) entering the tax net.

== Taxation ==
Main tax-related changes:

1. The basic exemption limit in the case of individuals increased from ₹ 160,000 to ₹ 180,000. However, there is no increase in basic exemption limit in the case of Resident Women who is below 60 years at any time during the previous year.
2. The qualifying age limit for senior citizens has been lowered from 60 years to 65 years and increased the current exemption limit under two categories.
3. Category −1 – Age of Individual – 60 years or more but less than 80 years at any time during the previous year. The basic exemption limit is increased from ₹ 240,000 to ₹ 250,000.
4. Category – 2 – Age of Individual beyond 80 years or more at any time during the previous year. The basic exemption limit is ₹ 500,000.
5. No need to file returns if the Income is less than or equal ₹ 500,000.
6. In the case of domestic companies the surcharge has been reduced from 7.5% to 5%.
7. In the companies other than domestic companies the surcharge has been reduced from 2.5% to 2%.
8. The definition of charitable purpose u/s 2 (15) includes "the advancement of any other object of general public utility". The monetary limit in respect of such activities has been enhanced from ₹ 1000,000 to ₹ 2500,000.
9. The amount paid by an assessee as an employer by way of contribution towards pension scheme, as referred to in sec 80CCD(2) on account of an employee to the extent it doesn't exceed 10% of the salary of employee in the previous year, shall be allowed as a deduction u/s 36 in computing the income under the head profit and gains of business or profession.
10. The Indian company which receives foreign dividend from foreign subsidiary company such dividend is taxable at the 15% as against 30% plus applicable surcharge.
11. The rate of MAT is increased to 18.5% from the existing rate of 18% of such book profit.
12. Minimum Alternative Tax has been introduced for Limited Liability Partnership (LLP) in line with MAT on companies with effect from the Assessment Year 2012–2013.
13. The Government exempts assesses having no other income other than salary from furnishing the return of income by notification. The proposed amendment shall be effective from 1 June 2011.
14. It is proposed to omit the requirement of quoting of Documentary Identification Number in notices / order / correspondences issued by Income tax department.
15. The SEZ developers are required to pay dividend distribution tax on dividends declared / distributed on or after 1 June 2011.
16. The deduction u/s 80CCF to investment in notified long term infrastructure bonds extended for the A.Y. 2012–13 also.
17. Liaison offices of a company will be required to file Annual Information in the prescribed form within the 60 days from the end of the financial year.
18. The tax holiday for power sector has been extended for further period of one year i.e. up to 31 March 2012.

Service tax

1. The following two new services have been proposed
  1. Services by air conditioned restaurants having licence to serve liquor; and
  2. short term accommodation hotels / inns / clubs / guest houses etc.
2. The monetary limit for adjustment of excess service tax paid is increased from ₹ 100,000 to ₹ 200,000.
3. The penalty for delayed payment of service tax u/s 76 has been reduced from 2% to 1% per month or ₹ 100 per day whichever is higher.
4. The maximum penalty reduced to 50% of the tax.
5. The rate of interest is reduced by 3% for assesses with turnover of up to ₹ 6 million.
6. The maximum penalty for delay in filing of return increased from ₹ 2,000 to ₹ 20,000.
