= 2014 Interim-Union budget of India =

Government budget

2014 Union Budget of India
- Emblem of India
- Submitted: 17 February 2014
- Submitted by: P. Chidambaram, Finance Minister
- Country: India
- Party: INC
- Website: http://www.indiabudget.nic.in Official Site

The 2014 Interim Union Budget of India was presented by Finance Minister, P.Chidambaram on 17 February 2014, 11 AM publicly to the citizens of the India.
