= 2024 Interim-Union budget of India =

Government budget

2024 Union Budget of India
- Emblem of India
- Submitted by: Minister of Finance
- Country: India
- Parliament: 17th (Lok Sabha)
- Government: second Modi ministry
- Party: Bharatiya Janata Party
- Finance minister: Nirmala Sitharaman
- Website: www.indiabudget.gov.in

The 2024 Interim-Union Budget of India provides comprehensive information regarding the projected revenue and government spending for the fiscal year 2024–25, commencing on 1 April 2024 and concluding on 31st March 2025.

== Background ==
Finance Minister Nirmala Sitharaman presented the Union Budget in the Lok Sabha on 1 February 2024 following the necessary approval from the President of India. During this presentation, the Finance Minister highlighted the crucial aspects of the document and justified the underlying thought processes behind the proposed initiatives. Subsequently, the Union Budget was subject to discussion in both houses of Parliament. Once it was passed in Lok Sabha as well as Rajya Sabha, it was forwarded to the President for the ultimate seal of approval.

== Contents ==
=== Funding and spending ===
The largest avenues of funding in the 2024 budget were Borrowing & other liabilities (28%), Income Tax (19%), GST & other taxes (18%), and corporation tax (17%). Non-tax revenue, Union Excise Duties, Customs, and non-debt capital receipts accounted for the rest of the budget.

The highest spending categories were interest payments (20%), state's share of taxes & duties (20%) and central sector scheme (16%). Finance commission & other transfers, defence, centrally sponsored schemes, subsidies, pensions, and other programs each accounted for less than 10% of the total budget.

=== Strategies ===
The budget announced plans for development of various state priorities, including environmental sustainability, transportation expansion, public health campaigns, tourism development, and tax reform.
