= Federation of Indian Export Organisations =

Indian trade promotion organization

- Emblem of India

Agency overview
- Formed: 1965
- Jurisdiction: Republic of India
- Headquarters: Niryat Bhawan, Rao Tula Ram Marg, Opp. Army Hospital Research & Referral, New Delhi-110 057
- Agency executives: Ashvini Kumar, President; Israr Ahmed, Vice President; Dr. Ajay Sahai, Director General & CEO
- Website: www.fieo.org

Federation of Indian Export Organisations (FIEO) is the apex trade promotion organisation in India set up by the Ministry of Commerce, Government of India, and the private trade and industry segment in 1965. The organisation is responsible for representing and assisting Indian entrepreneurs and exporters in foreign markets.

== Concept ==
FIEO is the premier body of all export promotion councils, commodity boards, and export development authorities in India. Directly and indirectly, it serves the interests of about 200,000 exporters. It is an ISO 9001:2015 certified organization.

FIEO works in partnership with various academic institutions across the country to forge better academia-industry understanding to develop quality human resource to match the requirement of international trade. It organises specialised training/awareness programmes, seminars, workshops for export executives and entrepreneurs with the objective to develop entrepreneurship in international trade. It provides option to professionals and freshers to upload their resume on FIEO website, free access to members to this niche database of professionals and freshers with knowledge of international trade for recruitment purposes, and free option to members to upload, on FIEO website, the job vacancies arising in their companies.

In September 2025, FIEO entered into a partnership with fintech company BRISKPE to provide exporters with technology-based solutions for faster and compliant cross-border payments. The initiative was intended to simplify international transactions and improve access to digital payment services for Indian exporters.

== Indian Trade Portal ==
FIEO developed and maintains the Indian Trade Portal website to keep members updated about trade policy matters and provide assistance. Internationally, FIEO establishes MoUs with counterpart organisations, arranges exhibitions and catalog shows. It is a partner of the Enterprise Europe Network. A month news magazine is published about trade and commerce, with worldwide readership among exporters and importers, international agencies, policy makers, and other stakeholders. Weekly and monthly e-bulletins are also published.

== Mobile app ==
On 8 August 2018, Suresh Prabhu, the then Commerce and Industry Minister launched the Niryat Mitra application. The application gives the users access to FIEO's monthly and weekly publications, event calendar, online event registration, information articles, press releases, research publications, and other important announcements. Members can create a company profile on the application, and receive daily updates on policy, preferential tariff, MFN status, SPS / TBT measures, identify tariff lines, applicable GST rates, export incentives, and more.

== Recognition ==
FIEO confers the Niryat Shree and Niryat Bandhu awards to its exporters and export facilitators for their outstanding performance in exports. It also confers the Export Excellence Awards to the members of the respective regions.
