= 1997 Union budget of India =

Government budget

- Emblem of India
- Submitted by: P. Chidambaram, Finance Minister
- Presented: 28 February 1997
- Parliament: Indian Parliament
- Party: United Progressive Alliance
- Website: http://indiabudget.nic.in

The 1997 Union Budget of India, also called the Dream Budget by the Indian media, was presented on 28 February 1997, by Finance Minister P. Chidambaram during the Deve Gowda government. The budget presented a roadmap for economic reforms in India and included lowering income tax rates, removing the surcharge on corporate taxes, and reduced corporate tax rates.
