= Union budget of India =

Annual budget of the Republic of India

2026 Union Budget of India
Annual Financial Statement of the Central Government for the year 2026-27 The Finance Bill, 2026
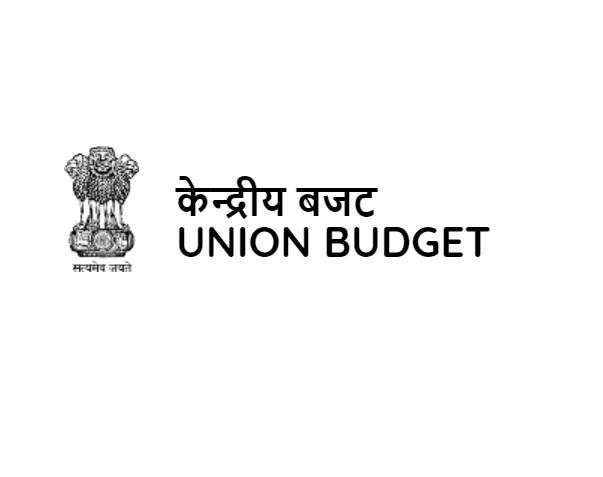
- Emblem of India
- Submitted: 1 February 2026
- Submitted by: Nirmala Sitharaman; Minister of Finance
- Submitted to: Parliament of India
- Presented: 1 February 2026
- Passed: 1 February 2026
- Country: India
- Parliament: 18th (Lok Sabha)
- Government: Third Modi ministry
- Party: Bharatiya Janata Party
- Finance minister: Nirmala Sitharaman
- Total revenue: ▲₹36.5 trillion (US$390 billion)
- Total expenditures: ▲₹53.5 trillion (US$570 billion)
- Tax cuts: Complete tax rebate on annual income upto ₹12.75 lakh (US$14,000)
- Deficit: ▼4.3% of GDP
- Debt: ▼55.6% of GDP
- GDP: ▲₹427 trillion (equivalent to ₹440 trillion or US$4.7 trillion in 2026)
- Website: www.indiabudget.gov.in

The Union Budget of India, also known as the Annual Financial Statement under Article 112 of the Indian Constitution, is the country's annual financial plan prepared by the Ministry of Finance. It outlines the government's expected revenues, collected by the Department of Revenue, and planned expenditures, managed by the Department of Expenditure. The budget serves as a financial blueprint for the upcoming fiscal year, forecasting economic conditions and aligning the Government of India's spending with its policy objectives.

The Government of India presents the Union Budget on the first day of February to ensure its implementation before the commencement of the new financial year in April. Prior to 2017, the budget was presented by the Finance Minister in the Parliament on the last working day of February. The Budget Division of the Department of Economic Affairs, within the Ministry of Finance, is the primary body responsible for preparing the budget.

The Union Budget is presented through the Finance Bill, and the Appropriation Bill must be passed by the Lok Sabha before it can take effect on April 1, the beginning of India's financial year.

Ever since television became ubiquitous, the Union Budget has been broadcast live from Sansad Bhawan on DD National, DD News, and Sansad TV and many times on the All India radio. The presentation typically runs uninterrupted from 11 AM to 1 PM, followed by a panel discussion that assesses the changes, benefits, and shortcomings of the budget. Additional budget documents and materials are available on the official budget website and the Union Budget mobile app.

The Rail Budget—which was presented separately since 1924—was merged with the Union Budget in 2016.

Since 1947, there have been a total of 73 annual budgets, 14 interim budgets, and four special or mini-budgets.

== Traditions ==
=== Time of budget announcement ===
Yashwant Sinha, the Finance Minister of India in the NDA government led by Prime Minister Atal Bihari Vajpayee, changed the longstanding tradition by announcing the 1999 Union Budget at 11 AM. The budget was previously presented at 5 PM, a colonial practice designed to align with British morning time. This new timing became the standard from 2001 onwards.

=== Date of budget announcement ===
In 2017, breaking from the tradition of presenting the Union Budget on the last working day of February, Arun Jaitley, the then Finance Minister in the NDA government led by Prime Minister Narendra Modi, announced that the budget would now be presented on February 1.

=== Halwa ceremony ===
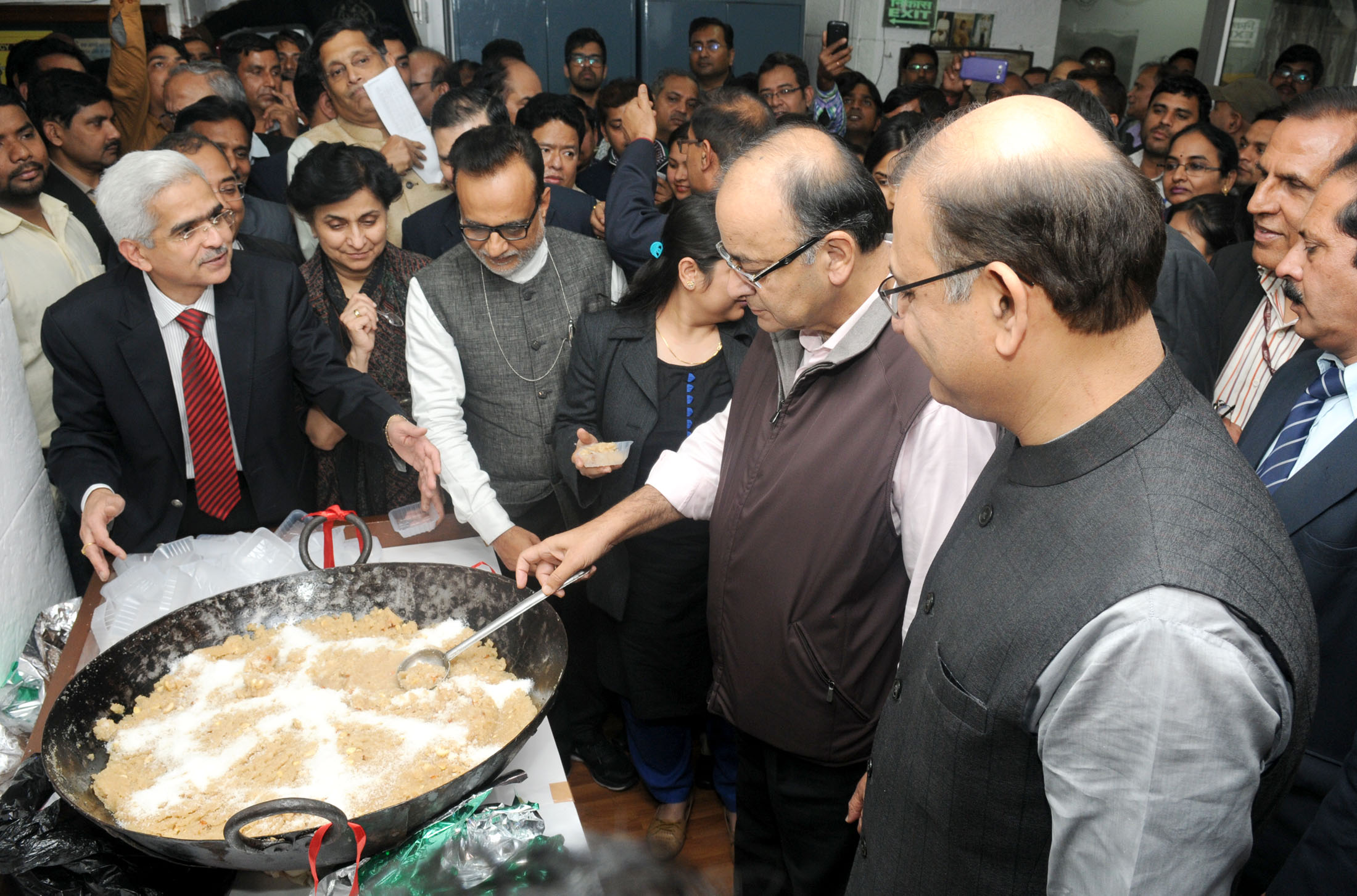
The Finance Minister Arun Jaitley at the Halwa ceremony to mark the commencement of the Budget printing process

The printing of the budget documents commence approximately a week before their presentation in the Parliament, marked by a traditional Halwa ceremony. During this event, a large quantity of halwa (a sweet delicacy) is prepared and served to the officers and support staff involved in the process. As part of the ceremony, these individuals are isolated and remain in the North Block until the Budget is presented. The Finance Minister serves the halwa, in keeping with the Indian custom of sharing something sweet before embarking on an important task.

=== Lock-In Period ===
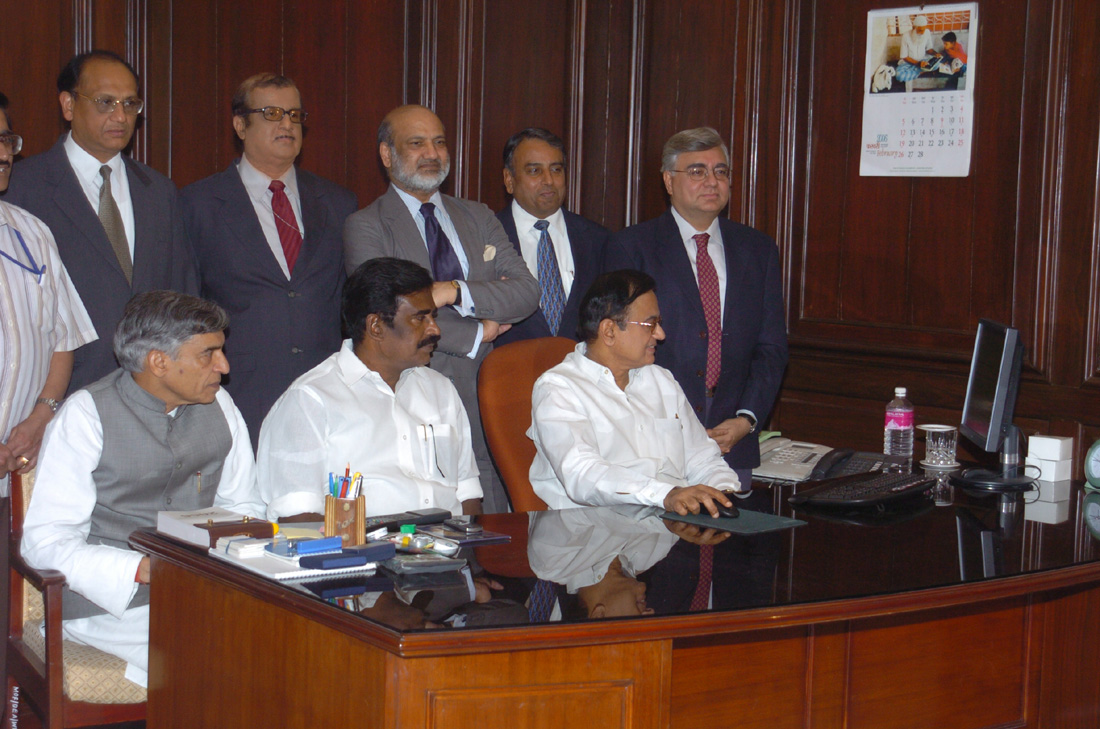
Union Finance Minister putting the final touches on the General Budget 2006–07 from his desktop

The "lock-in" is a period during which the secrecy of the Budget is maintained to ensure its contents are not divulged or leaked before the actual presentation. It begins with the Halwa ceremony and commemorates the commencement of a period of isolation for the finance ministry staff at the Budget Press, located at the ministry's headquarters in the North Block. These staff members are not allowed to leave the premises until the Finance Minister concludes their Budget speech on February 1.

In the past, the "lock-in" period, during which officials were not allowed to contact the outside world, was longer. However, since 2021, with the Budget being presented in a purely digital format, the lock-in period has become shorter.

The basement of North Block once housed a printing press that was used to print budget documents for 40 years, from 1980 to 2020. Since then, the budget has transitioned to a digital format, with only a minimal number of documents being printed, while the majority of distribution takes place through a mobile app or the official website.

The transition to a digital format also shortened the lock-in period, reducing it to just five days, compared to the previous duration of up to two weeks.

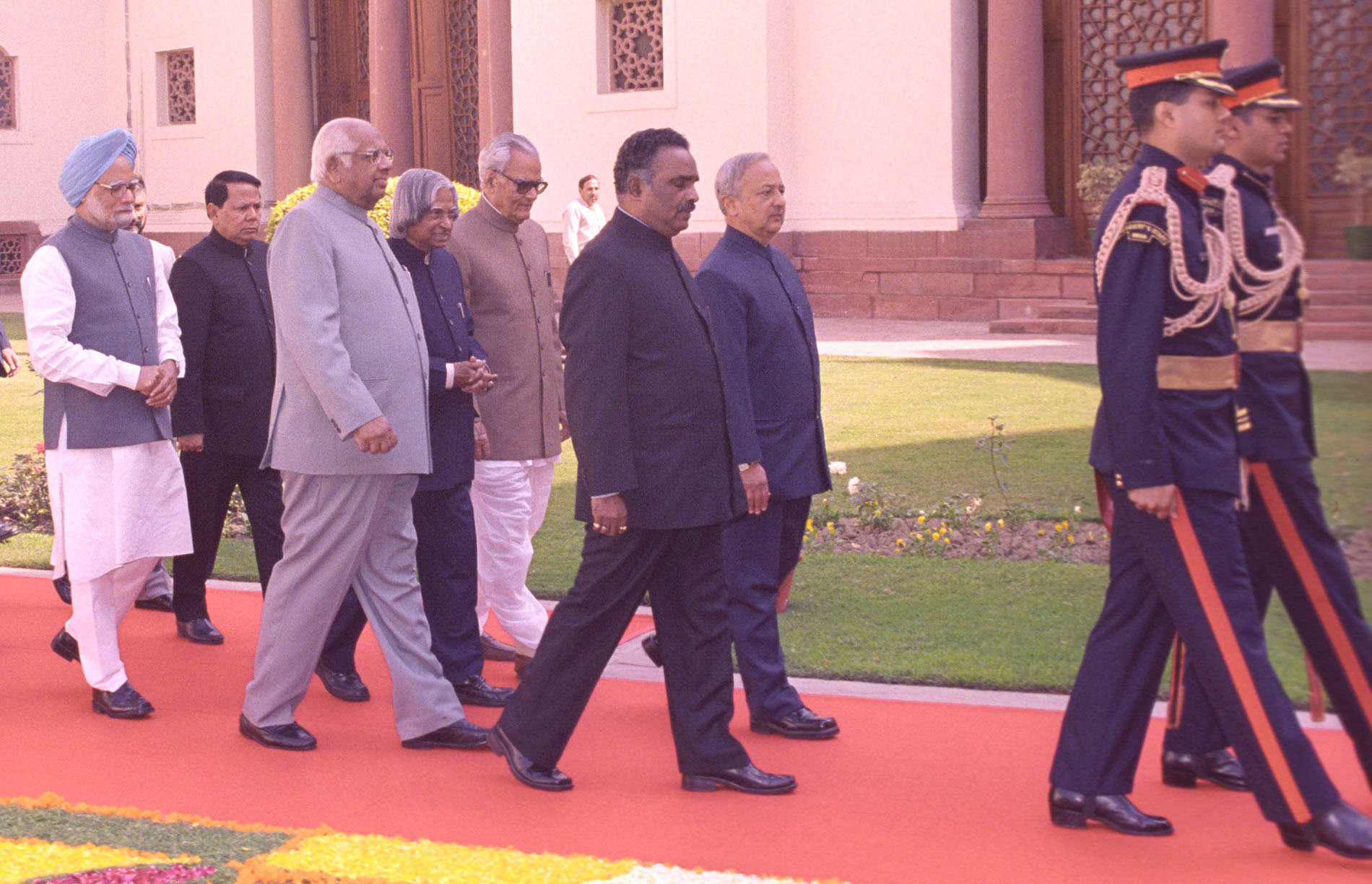
The President being led in a ceremonial procession to the Central Hall of Parliament to deliver the pre-budget speech during the Budget Session, 2005

=== Briefcase ===
Until 2018, it was a tradition for the Minister of Finance to carry the budget in a leather briefcase. This practice was established by India’s first Finance Minister, R. K. Shanmukham Chetty.

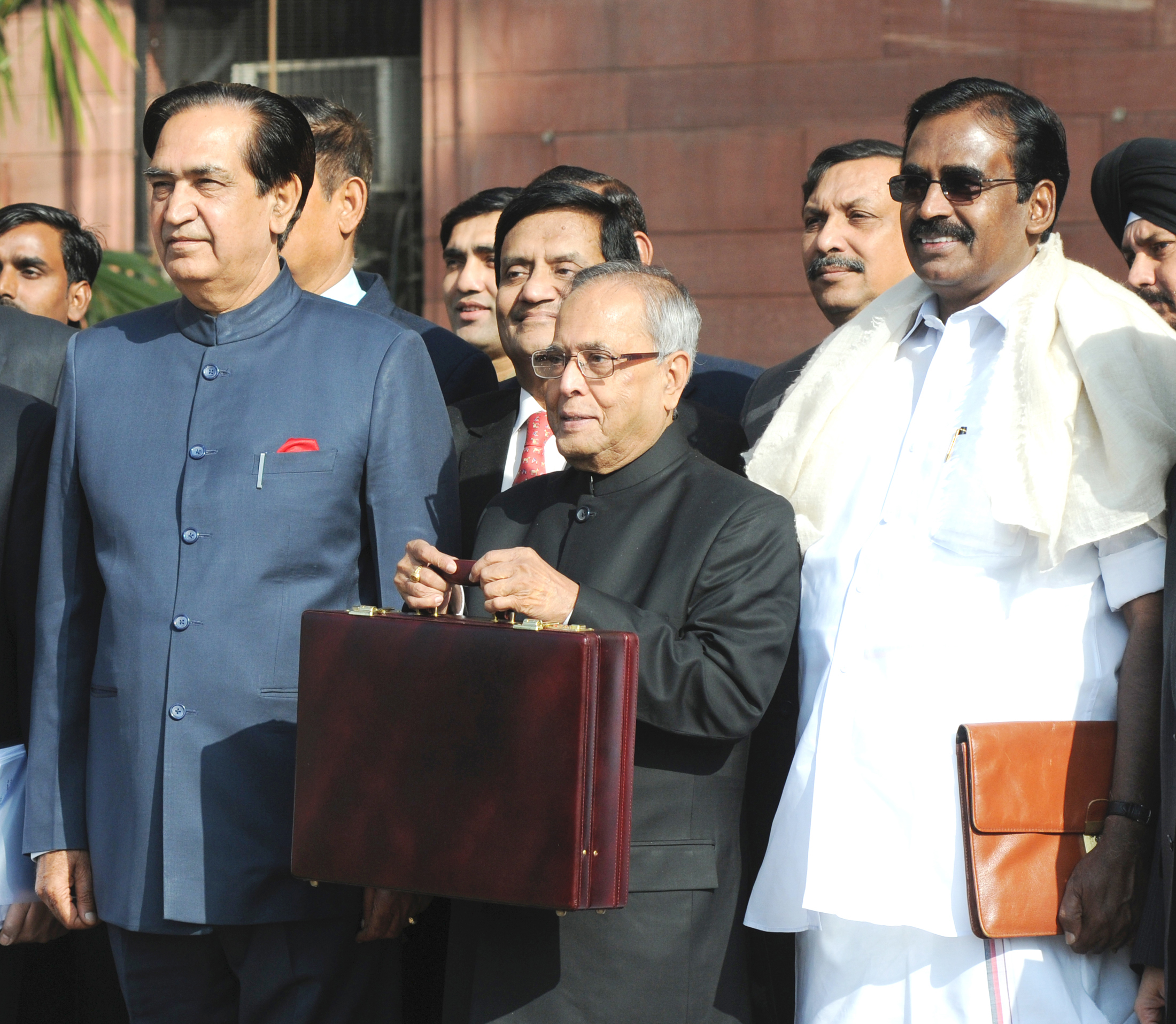
The Finance Minister with the budget briefcase, 2011

=== Bahi-Khata ===
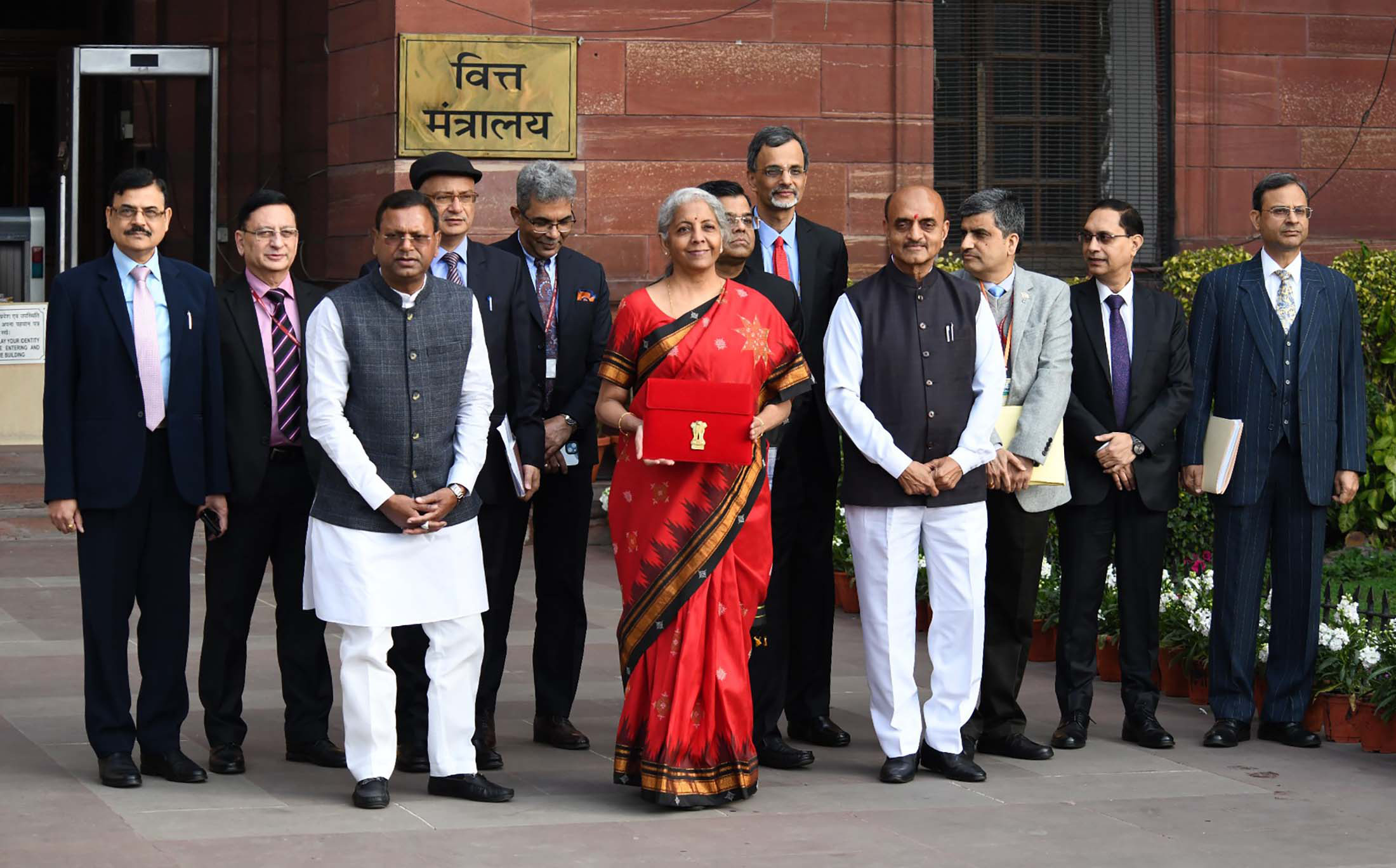
The Finance Minister with a digital Bahi-Khata

On 5 July 2019, Finance Minister Nirmala Sitharaman broke tradition by carrying the budget in a Bahi-Khata, a traditional Indian accounting ledger used to maintain financial records. On 1 February 2021, she presented the first paperless budget, using a digital tablet wrapped in a traditional bahi-khata style pouch.

=== FM called on President at the Rashtrapati Bhavan ===
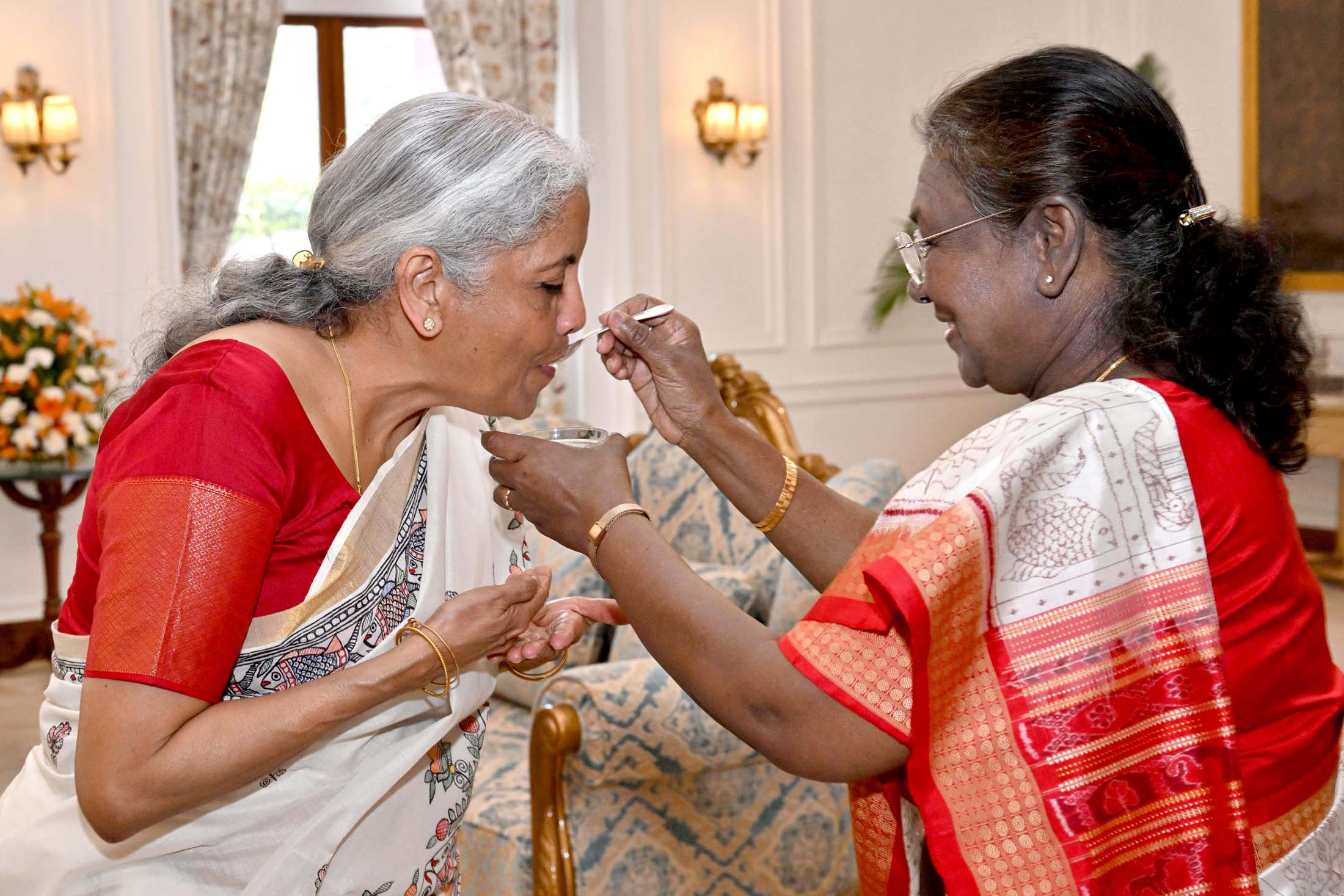
Nirmala Sitharaman being given the customary curd and sugar by President Droupadi Murmu before the Union Budget presentation on 1 February 2025

As per established tradition, the Finance Minister meets the President at the Rashtrapati Bhavan to seek assent before heading to Parliament to present the Union Budget. The President offers the Finance Minister a customary serving of curd and sugar, a gesture believed to bring good luck.

=== Cabinet Meeting in Sansad Bhawan ===
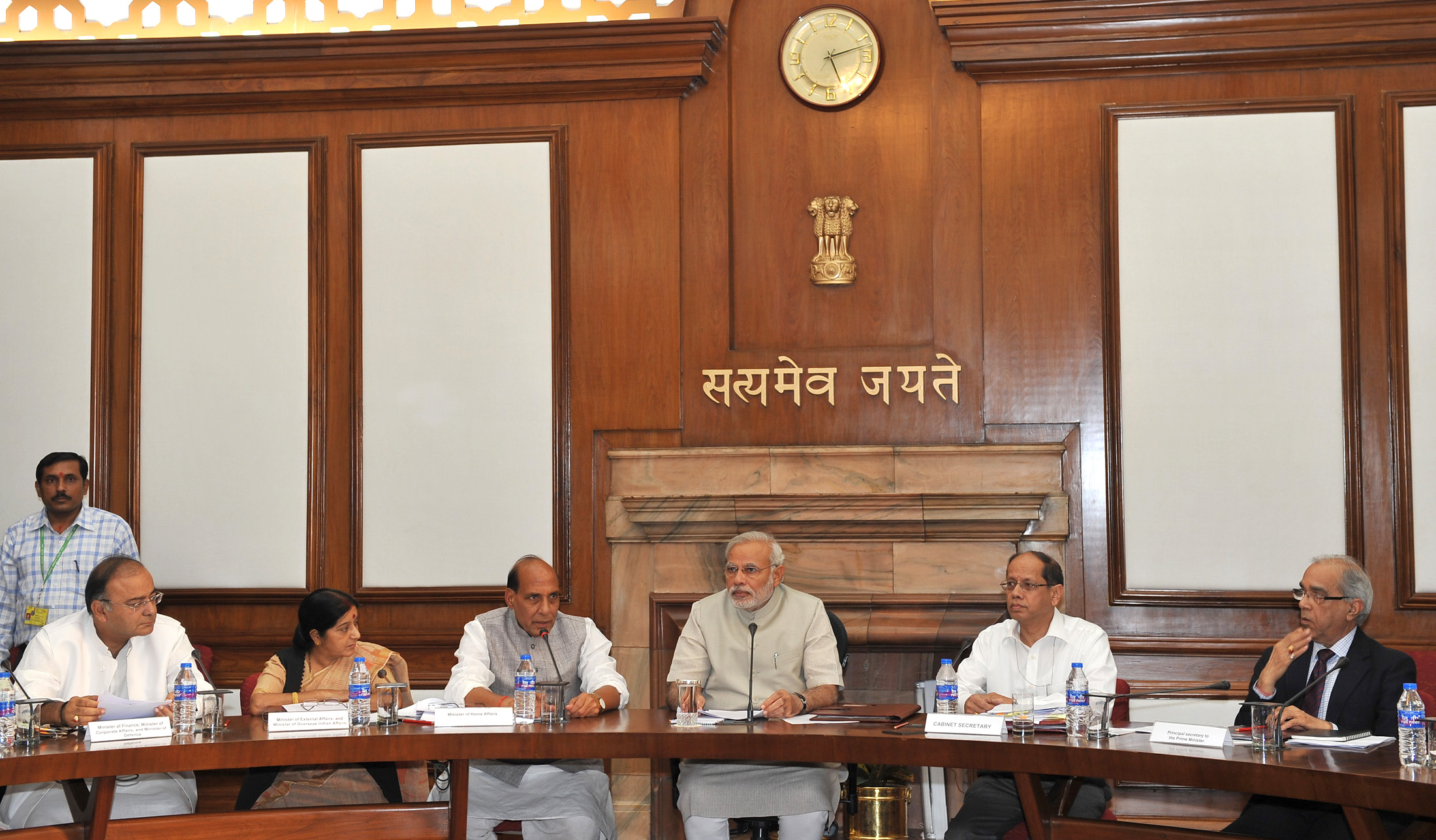
Cabinet Meeting in Sansad

A meeting of the Union Cabinet is held at 10 AM on February 1. After receiving the cabinet's approval, the Finance Minister presents the Union Budget in the Parliament of India.

=== Post Budget Press Meet ===
The Union Minister for Finance and Corporate Affairs, accompanied by the Ministers of State for Finance, the Finance Secretary, and other Secretaries of the Ministry of Finance, addresses a Post-Budget Press Conference. During this conference, they provide details on the announcements made in the Budget speech and respond to media queries.

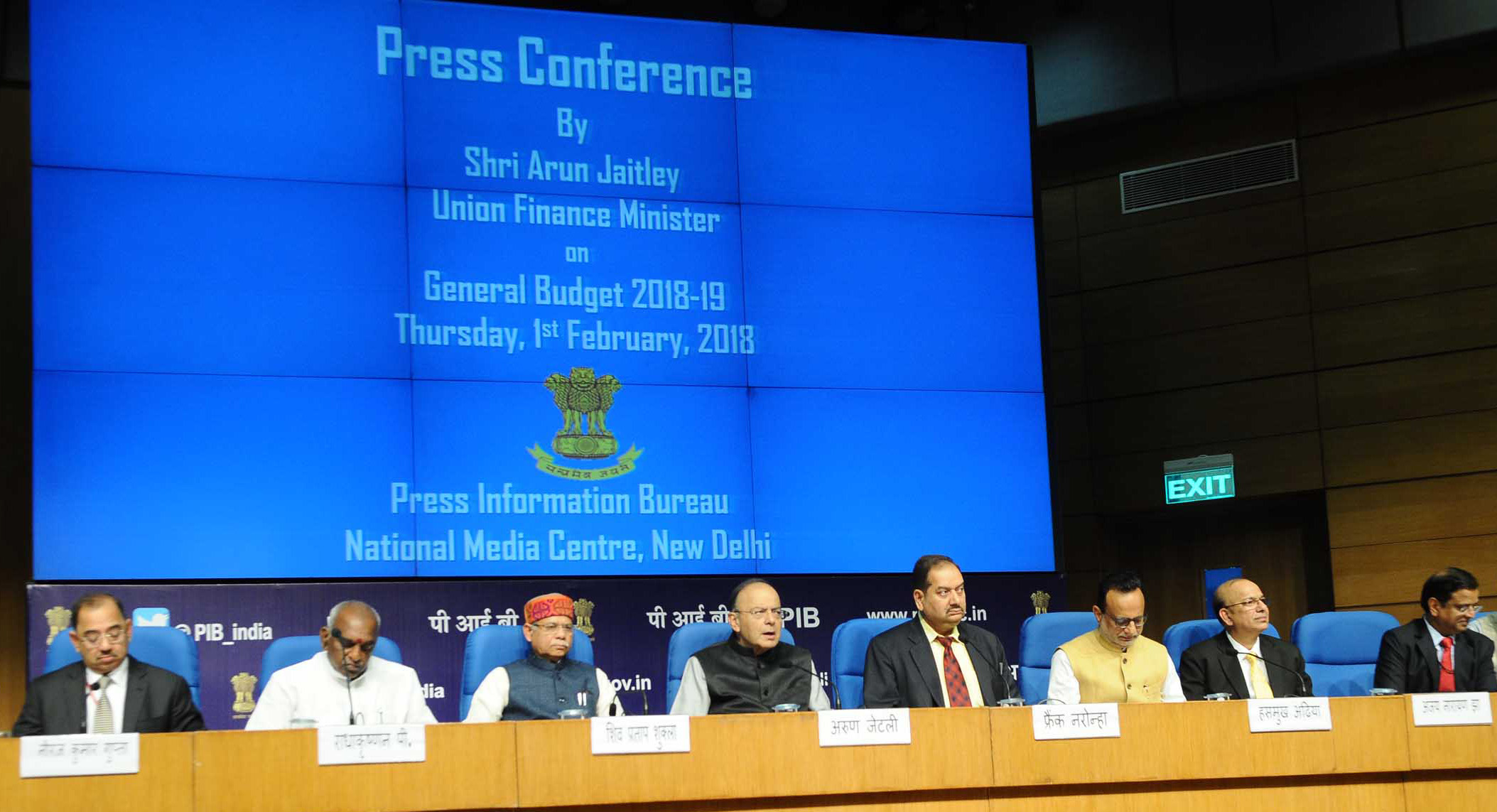
Union Minister for Finance addressing a Post Budget Press Conference in New Delhi

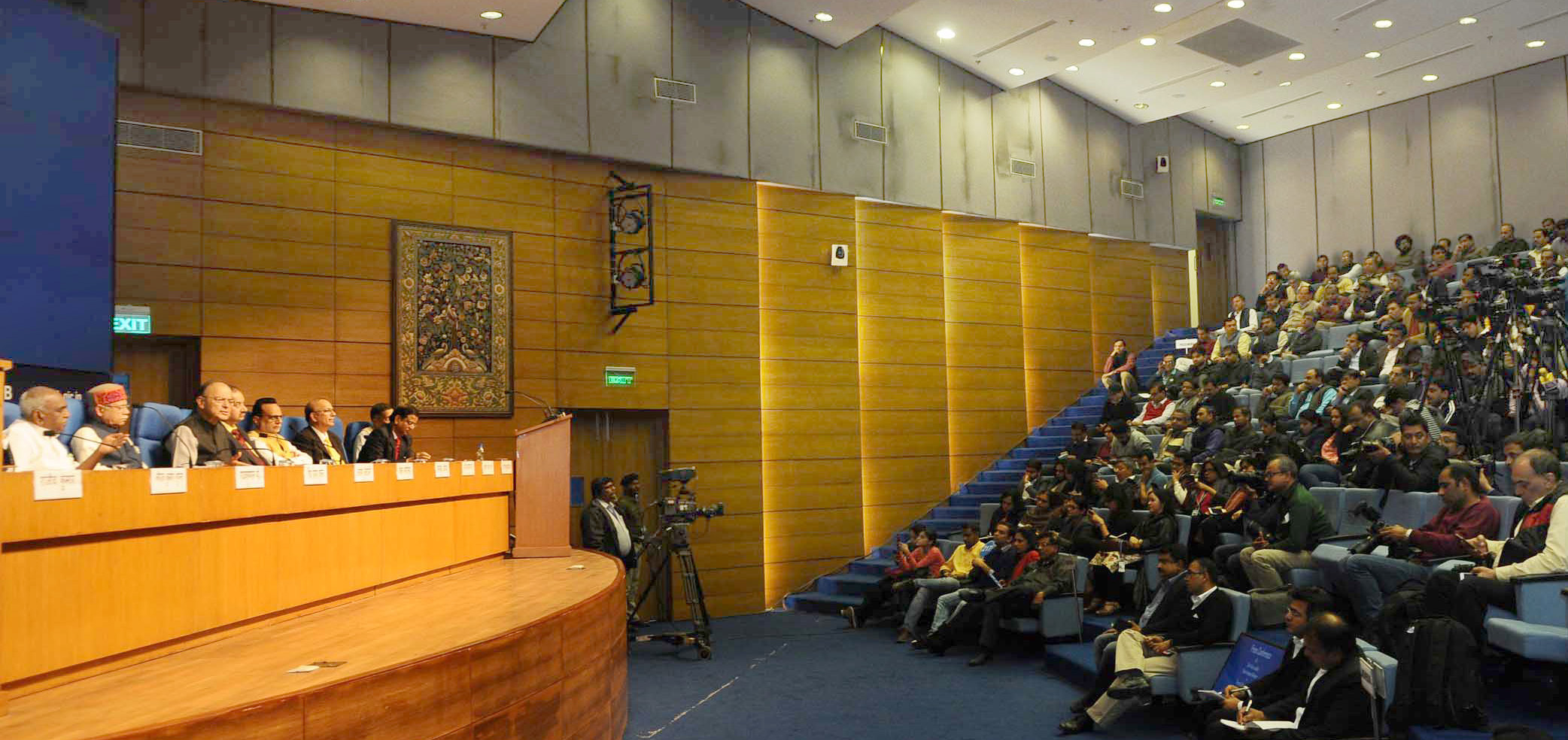
Press Meet at National Media Center New Delhi

=== Post Budget Meeting ===
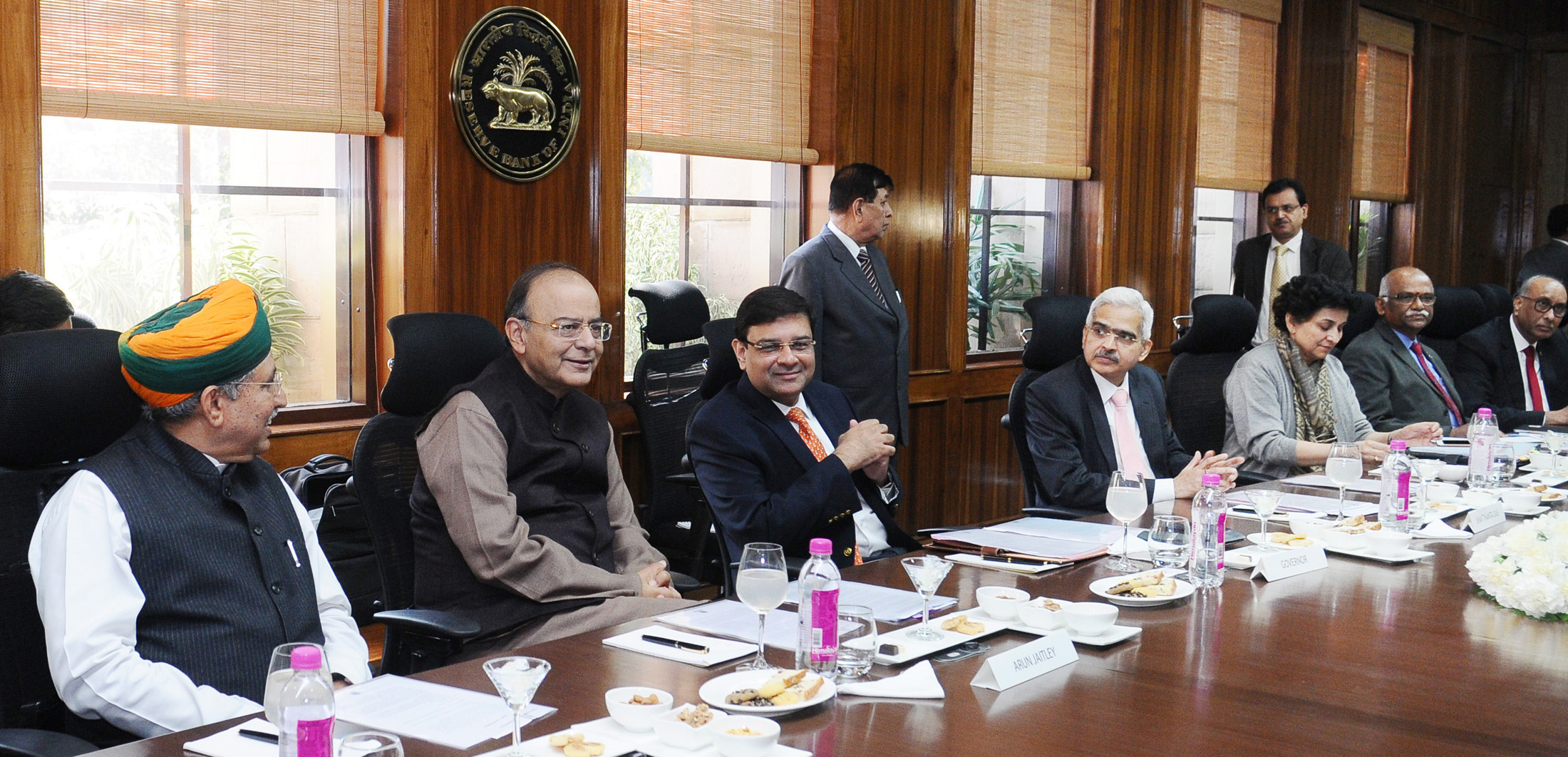
The Union Minister for Finance addressing the Central Board of Directors of the Reserve Bank of India in its customary post-budget meeting in New Delhi

The Finance Minister addresses the Reserve Bank of India's central board of directors, highlighting key points of the Union Budget, including the fiscal consolidation roadmap and the high capital expenditure plan. The minister also discusses the announcements made during the budget speech. It is customary for the Finance Minister to address the RBI board after the budget presentation.

== Interim Budget ==
An interim budget is not the same as a "Vote on Account". While a "Vote on Account" addresses only the expenditure side of the government's budget, an interim budget provides a complete set of accounts, including both expenditure and receipts. An interim budget presents a full financial statement, similar to a complete budget. Although the law does not prevent the Union government from introducing tax changes, successive governments typically avoid making significant changes to income tax laws during an interim budget, especially in an election year.

== Difference between Interim Budget and Union Budget ==
An interim budget differs from a Union budget in that it serves as a temporary financial plan for the government when elections are approaching. This budget seeks parliamentary approval to cover the government's expenses for the remaining months of its term. Unlike the Union budget, which outlines the entire year, an interim budget focuses on the transition period until the new government assumes office. While estimates are provided for the full year, the incoming government has the flexibility to modify them when preparing the new budget. The interim budget also has the authority to make changes to the tax regime, but historically, significant tax adjustments or new schemes are avoided due to the limited time in office. Essentially, it mirrors the first part of a Union budget, detailing the previous year's income and expenses, with only essential expenses documented until the elections. Additionally, regulations from the Election Commission of India prevent any substantial policy changes that could potentially influence voters during this critical period.

== History Of Budget ==
=== Pre-liberalization ===
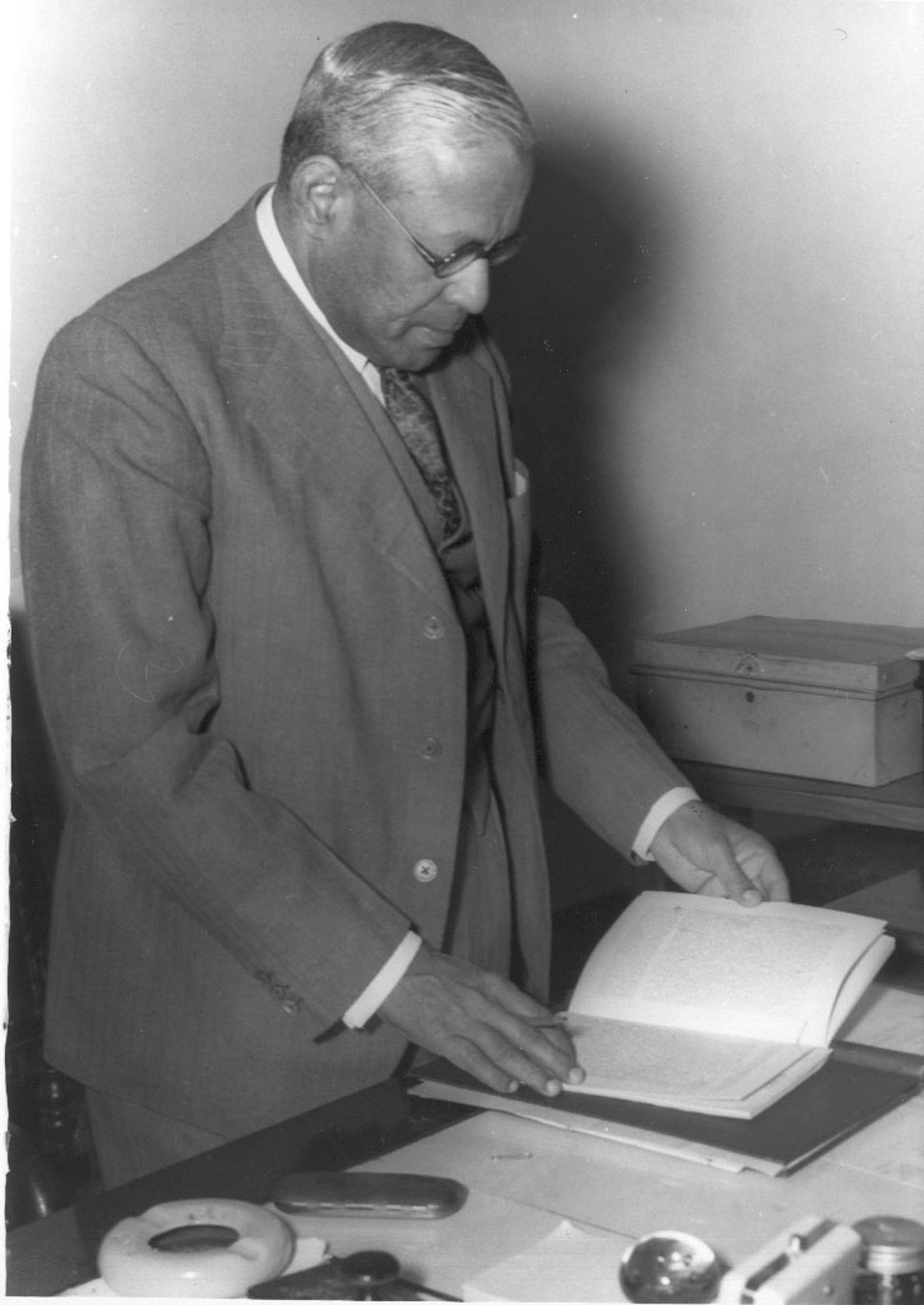
Finance Minister John Matthai takes a final glance at the budget proposals before delivering his budget speech in the Parliament in February 1949

The first Union Budget of independent India was presented by R. K. Shanmukham Chetty on 26 November 1947. Total revenues amounted to ₹171.15 crore, while the fiscal deficit was ₹24.59 crore. The total expenditure was estimated at ₹197.29 crore, with Defence expenditure constituting ₹92.74 crore.

The Union Budgets for the fiscal years 1959–61 to 1963–64, including the interim budget for 1962–63, were presented by Morarji Desai. On 29 February 1964 and 1968, he became the only Finance Minister to present the Union Budget on his birthday. Desai presented a total of five annual budgets and an interim budget during his first term, and three final budgets and one interim budget during his second term, when he served as both the Finance Minister and the Deputy Prime Minister of India. After Desai's resignation, Indira Gandhi, the then Prime Minister, took over the Ministry of Finance, becoming the first woman to hold the post of Finance Minister in India.

Hirubhai M. Patel presented the shortest budget speech for the interim budget of 1977, which was merely 800 words long. Pranab Mukherjee—the first Rajya Sabha member to hold the Finance portfolio—presented the annual budgets for the financial years 1982–83, 1983–84, and 1984–85. Rajiv Gandhi presented the Union Budget for 1987–89 after V. P. Singh resigned from his government, becoming the third Prime Minister to present a budget, following in the footsteps of his mother and grandfather. N. D. Tiwari presented the budget for 1988–89, followed by S. B. Chavan for 1989–90 and Madhu Dandawate for 1990–91. Dr. Manmohan Singh became the Finance Minister and presented the interim budget for 1991–92, as elections were forced due to political developments. Following early elections in May 1991, in which the Indian National Congress returned to power, Dr. Manmohan Singh, as the Finance Minister, presented the budget for 1991–92.

=== Post-liberalization ===
Manmohan Singh, under Prime Minister P. V. Narasimha Rao, opened the Indian economy in his annual budgets from 1992 to 1993, encouraging foreign investments and reducing the peak import duty from over 300% to 50%. After the 1996 elections, a non-Congress ministry assumed office, and the financial budget for 1996–97 was presented by P. Chidambaram, who was then part of the Tamil Maanila Congress. Following a constitutional crisis when the I. K. Gujral Ministry was on its way out, a special session of Parliament was convened solely to pass Chidambaram's 1997–98 budget, which was passed without debate. After the general elections in March 1998, which led to the Bharatiya Janata Party forming the Central Government, Yashwant Sinha, the then Finance Minister, presented both the interim and final budgets for 1998–99. Following the general elections in 1999, Sinha again became the Finance Minister and presented four annual budgets from 1999–2000 to 2002–2003. Due to the elections in May 2004, an interim budget was presented by Jaswant Singh.

The Union Budget of India for 2012–2013 was presented by Pranab Mukherjee on 16 March 2012, marking the seventh budget of his career. These budgetary proposals were applicable for the financial year from 1 April 2012 to 31 March 2013. The Union Budget for 2013–2014 was presented by P. Chidambaram on 28 February 2013. The Interim Union Budget for 2014–2015 was presented on 17 February 2014. The Union Budget of India for the years spanning from 2014 to 2019 was presented by Arun Jaitley. The Interim Union Budget for 2019–2020 was presented by Piyush Goyal, and Nirmala Sitharaman has been presenting the Union Budget since 2020.

== Finance ministers who have presented the budget ==
=== Timeline ===
Morarji Desai holds the record for presenting the most Union Budgets, with 10 budgets, followed by P. Chidambaram and Nirmala Sitharaman, both of whom presented 9. In 2026, Sitharaman equalled Chidambaram's record. As Finance Ministers, Pranab Mukherjee presented 8 budgets, C. D. Deshmukh presented 7 budgets, while Manmohan Singh and T. T. Krishnamachari each presented 6 budgets.

Notes:
^{1}During Deshmukh's tenure, the Budget papers were prepared in Hindi as well for the first time.
^{2}Morarji Desai presented eight annual and two interim budgets.

== List of Union Budgets ==
Sr. No	Year	Date	Presented by (Finance Minister)	Prime Minister	Party/Coalition
1	1947–48	26 November 1947	R. K. Shanmukham Chetty	Jawaharlal Nehru	Indian National Congress
2	1948–49	28 February 1948	R. K. Shanmukham Chetty	Jawaharlal Nehru	Indian National Congress
3	1949–50	28 February 1949	John Matthai	Jawaharlal Nehru	Indian National Congress
4	1950–51	28 February 1950	John Matthai	Jawaharlal Nehru	Indian National Congress
5	1951–52	28 February 1951	C. D. Deshmukh	Jawaharlal Nehru	Indian National Congress
6	1952–53 (Interim)	29 February 1952	C. D. Deshmukh	Jawaharlal Nehru	Indian National Congress
7	1952–53	23 May 1952	C. D. Deshmukh	Jawaharlal Nehru	Indian National Congress
8	1953–54	27 February 1953	C. D. Deshmukh	Jawaharlal Nehru	Indian National Congress
9	1954–55	27 February 1954	C. D. Deshmukh	Jawaharlal Nehru	Indian National Congress
10	1955–56	28 February 1955	C. D. Deshmukh	Jawaharlal Nehru	Indian National Congress
11	1956–57	29 February 1956	C. D. Deshmukh	Jawaharlal Nehru	Indian National Congress
12	1957–58 (Interim)	19 March 1957	T. T. Krishnamachari	Jawaharlal Nehru	Indian National Congress
13	1957–58	15 May 1957	T. T. Krishnamachari	Jawaharlal Nehru	Indian National Congress
14	1958–59	28 February 1958	Jawaharlal Nehru (Prime Minister)	Jawaharlal Nehru	Indian National Congress
15	1959–60	28 February 1959	Morarji Desai	Jawaharlal Nehru	Indian National Congress
16	1960–61	29 February 1960	Morarji Desai	Jawaharlal Nehru	Indian National Congress
17	1961–62	28 February 1961	Morarji Desai	Jawaharlal Nehru	Indian National Congress
18	1962–63 (Interim)	14 March 1962	Morarji Desai	Jawaharlal Nehru	Indian National Congress
19	1962–63	23 April 1962	Morarji Desai	Jawaharlal Nehru	Indian National Congress
20	1963–64	28 February 1963	Morarji Desai	Jawaharlal Nehru	Indian National Congress
21	1964–65	29 February 1964	T. T. Krishnamachari	Jawaharlal Nehru	Indian National Congress
22	1965–66	27 February 1965	T. T. Krishnamachari	Lal Bahadur Shastri	Indian National Congress
23	1966–67	28 February 1966	Sachindra Chaudhuri	Indira Gandhi	Indian National Congress
24	1967–68 (Interim)	20 March 1967	Morarji Desai	Indira Gandhi	Indian National Congress
25	1967–68	25 May 1967	Morarji Desai	Indira Gandhi	Indian National Congress
26	1968–69	29 February 1968	Morarji Desai	Indira Gandhi	Indian National Congress
27	1969–70	28 February 1969	Morarji Desai	Indira Gandhi	Indian National Congress
28	1970–71	28 February 1970	Indira Gandhi (Prime Minister)	Indira Gandhi	Indian National Congress
29	1971–72	24 March 1971	Yashwantrao Chavan	Indira Gandhi	Indian National Congress
30	1972–73	16 March 1972	Yashwantrao Chavan	Indira Gandhi	Indian National Congress
31	1973–74	28 February 1973	Yashwantrao Chavan	Indira Gandhi	Indian National Congress
32	1974–75	28 February 1974	Yashwantrao Chavan	Indira Gandhi	Indian National Congress
33	1975–76	28 February 1975	Chidambaram Subramaniam	Indira Gandhi	Indian National Congress
34	1976–77	15 May 1976	Chidambaram Subramaniam	Indira Gandhi	Indian National Congress
35	1977–78	17 June 1977	Hirubhai M. Patel	Morarji Desai	Janata Party
36	1978–79	28 February 1978	Hirubhai M. Patel	Morarji Desai	Janata Party
37	1979–80	28 February 1979	Charan Singh (Prime Minister)	Morarji Desai	Janata Party
38	1980–81	18 June 1980	Ramaswamy Venkataraman	Indira Gandhi	Indian National Congress
39	1981–82	28 February 1981	Ramaswamy Venkataraman	Indira Gandhi	Indian National Congress
40	1982–83	27 February 1982	Pranab Mukherjee	Indira Gandhi	Indian National Congress
41	1983–84	28 February 1983	Pranab Mukherjee	Indira Gandhi	Indian National Congress
42	1984–85	29 February 1984	Pranab Mukherjee	Indira Gandhi	Indian National Congress
43	1985–86	16 March 1985	V. P. Singh	Rajiv Gandhi	Indian National Congress
44	1986–87	28 February 1986	V. P. Singh	Rajiv Gandhi	Indian National Congress
45	1987–88	28 February 1987	Rajiv Gandhi (Prime Minister)	Rajiv Gandhi	Indian National Congress
46	1988–89	29 February 1988	N. D. Tiwari	Rajiv Gandhi	Indian National Congress
47	1989–90	28 February 1989	Shankarrao Chavan	Rajiv Gandhi	Indian National Congress
48	1990–91	19 March 1990	Madhu Dandavate	V. P. Singh	Third Front
49	1991–92	24 July 1991	Manmohan Singh	P. V. Narasimha Rao	Indian National Congress
50	1992–93	29 February 1992	Manmohan Singh	P. V. Narasimha Rao	Indian National Congress
51	1993–94	27 February 1993	Manmohan Singh	P. V. Narasimha Rao	Indian National Congress
52	1994–95	28 February 1994	Manmohan Singh	P. V. Narasimha Rao	Indian National Congress
53	1995–96	15 March 1995	Manmohan Singh	P. V. Narasimha Rao	Indian National Congress
54	1996–97	19 March 1996	P. Chidambaram	H. D. Deve Gowda	United Front
55	1997–98	28 February 1997	P. Chidambaram	H. D. Deve Gowda	United Front
56	1998–99	01 June 1998	Yashwant Sinha	Atal Bihari Vajpayee	National Democratic Alliance
57	1999–20	27 February 1999	Yashwant Sinha	Atal Bihari Vajpayee	National Democratic Alliance
58	2000–01	29 February 2000	Yashwant Sinha	Atal Bihari Vajpayee	National Democratic Alliance
59	2001–02	28 February 2001	Yashwant Sinha	Atal Bihari Vajpayee	National Democratic Alliance
60	2002–03	28 February 2002	Yashwant Sinha	Atal Bihari Vajpayee	National Democratic Alliance
61	2003–04	28 February 2003	Jaswant Singh	Atal Bihari Vajpayee	National Democratic Alliance
62	2004–05 (Interim)	4 February 2004	Jaswant Singh	Atal Bihari Vajpayee	National Democratic Alliance
63	2004–05	8 July 2004	P. Chidambaram	Manmohan Singh	United Progressive Alliance
64	2005–06	28 February 2005	P. Chidambaram	Manmohan Singh	United Progressive Alliance
65	2006–07	28 February 2006	P. Chidambaram	Manmohan Singh	United Progressive Alliance
66	2007–08	28 February 2007	P. Chidambaram	Manmohan Singh	United Progressive Alliance
67	2008–09	29 February 2008	P. Chidambaram	Manmohan Singh	United Progressive Alliance
68	2009–10 (Interim)	16 February 2009	Pranab Mukherjee	Manmohan Singh	United Progressive Alliance
69	2009–10	6 July 2009	Pranab Mukherjee	Manmohan Singh	United Progressive Alliance
70	2010–11	26 February 2010	Pranab Mukherjee	Manmohan Singh	United Progressive Alliance
71	2011–12	28 February 2011	Pranab Mukherjee	Manmohan Singh	United Progressive Alliance
72	2012–13	16 March 2012	Pranab Mukherjee	Manmohan Singh	United Progressive Alliance
73	2013–14	28 February 2013	P. Chidambaram	Manmohan Singh	United Progressive Alliance
74	2014–15 (Interim)	17 February 2014	P. Chidambaram	Manmohan Singh	United Progressive Alliance
75	2014–15	10 July 2014	Arun Jaitley	Narendra Modi	National Democratic Alliance
76	2015–16	28 February 2015	Arun Jaitley	Narendra Modi	National Democratic Alliance
77	2016–17	29 February 2016	Arun Jaitley	Narendra Modi	National Democratic Alliance
78	2017–18	1 February 2017	Arun Jaitley	Narendra Modi	National Democratic Alliance
79	2018–19	1 February 2018	Arun Jaitley	Narendra Modi	National Democratic Alliance
80	2019–20 (Interim)	1 February 2019	Piyush Goyal	Narendra Modi	National Democratic Alliance
81	2019–20	5 July 2019	Nirmala Sitharaman	Narendra Modi	National Democratic Alliance
82	2020–21	1 February 2020	Nirmala Sitharaman	Narendra Modi	National Democratic Alliance
83	2021–22	1 February 2021	Nirmala Sitharaman	Narendra Modi	National Democratic Alliance
84	2022–23	1 February 2022	Nirmala Sitharaman	Narendra Modi	National Democratic Alliance
85	2023–24	1 February 2023	Nirmala Sitharaman	Narendra Modi	National Democratic Alliance
86	2024–25 (Interim)	1 February 2024	Nirmala Sitharaman	Narendra Modi	National Democratic Alliance
87	2024–25	22 July 2024	Nirmala Sitharaman	Narendra Modi	National Democratic Alliance
88	2025–26	1 February 2025	Nirmala Sitharaman	Narendra Modi	National Democratic Alliance
89	2026–27	1 February 2026	Nirmala Sitharaman	Narendra Modi	National Democratic Alliance

== Union Budget History ==
The following table shows the Total Receipts, Fiscal Deficits, Total Defense Spending and Major Subsidies as listed in past Union Budgets, as per the "At a Glance" subsection of each budget. Figures from the 1993-94 budget and prior are obtained from the budget Annexures. The following figures are not adjusted for inflation.

Year	Total Receipts (Note: Total Receipts includes tax revenue, non-tax revenue and capital receipts.)	Fiscal Deficit (Note: Fiscal deficit is defined as revenue receipts plus total non-debt receipts minus total expenditure, and is reflective of the total borrowing requirement of Government.)	Total Budget	Budget as Percent of GDP	Total Defence Spending (Note: Total Defense Spending is a sum of both Revenue and Capital Expenditure on Defense Services (in budgets prior to 2015).)	Major Subsidies (Note: Major Subsidies includes Fertiliser, Food and Petroleum, as per budgets from 2016 onwards.)
1947-48	₹1,856,800,000	₹	₹		₹777,500,000	₹
1948-49	₹3,589,200,000	₹	₹		₹1,460,600,000	₹
1949-50	₹3,330,300,000	₹	₹		₹1,488,600,000	₹
1950-51	₹3,934,600,000	₹	₹		₹1,641,300,000	₹
1951-52	₹5,324,200,000	₹	₹		₹1,709,600,000	₹
1952-53	₹4,383,100,000	₹	₹		₹1,795,200,000	₹
1953-54	₹4,246,200,000	₹	₹		₹1,863,000,000	₹
1954-55	₹4,700,700,000	₹	₹		₹1,866,600,000	₹
1955-56	₹5,203,200,000	₹	₹		₹1,722,800,000	₹
1956-57	₹6,141,100,000	₹	₹		₹1,921,500,000	₹
1957-58	₹7,393,700,000	₹	₹		₹2,567,200,000	₹
1958-59	₹7,458,200,000	₹	₹		₹2,509,300,000	₹
1959-60	₹8,679,000,000	₹	₹		₹2,308,600,000	₹
1960-61	₹9,771,100,000	₹	₹		₹2,475,500,000	₹
1961-62	₹19,154,600,000	₹	₹		₹3,124,900,000	₹
1962-63	₹23,602,700,000	₹	₹		₹4,739,100,000	₹
1963-64	₹30,035,100,000	₹	₹		₹8,161,200,000	₹
1964-65	₹33,595,300,000	₹	₹		₹8,058,000,000	₹
1965-66	₹37,476,600,000	₹	₹		₹8,847,500,000	₹
1966-67	₹43,286,600,000	₹	₹		₹9,085,900,000	₹
1967-68	₹43,053,600,000	₹	₹		₹9,684,300,000	₹
1968-69	₹43,756,200,000	₹	₹		₹10,331,900,000	₹
1969-70	₹50,024,000,000	₹	₹		₹11,008,800,000	₹
1970-71	₹53,883,500,000	₹	₹		₹11,992,900,000	₹
1971-72	₹65,319,800,000	₹	₹		₹15,253,500,000	₹
1972-73	₹69,734,100,000	₹	₹		₹16,522,200,000	₹
1973-74	₹80,483,500,000	₹	₹		₹16,808,000,000	₹
1974-75	₹93,319,100,000	₹	₹		₹21,122,700,000	₹
1975-76	₹122,228,500,000	₹	₹		₹24,722,900,000	₹
1976-77	₹125,841,124,000	₹	₹		₹25,625,400,000	₹
1977-78	₹148,268,300,000	₹	₹		₹26,336,400,000	₹
1978-79	₹175,249,900,000	₹	₹		₹28,676,700,000	₹
1979-80	₹154,100,000,000	₹	₹		₹31,640,000,000	₹
1980-81	₹195,790,000,000	₹	₹		₹36,040,000,000	₹
1981-82	₹229,920,000,000	₹	₹		₹43,290,000,000	₹
1982-83	₹280,600,000,000	₹	₹		₹50,250,000,000	₹
1983-84	₹341,170,000,000	₹	₹		₹58,310,000,000	₹
1984-85	₹398,870,000,000	₹	₹		₹70,610,000,000	₹
1985-86	₹473,500,000,000	₹	₹		₹79,880,000,000	₹
1986-87	₹546,550,000,000	₹	₹		₹104,770,000,000	₹
1987-88	₹624,450,000,000	₹	₹		₹119,680,000,000	₹
1988-89	₹734,690,000,000	₹	₹		₹133,410,000,000	₹
1989-90	₹823,160,000,000	₹	₹		₹144,160,000,000	₹
1990-91	₹939,510,000,000	₹	₹		₹152,460,000,000	₹
1991-92	₹1,045,590,000,000	₹	₹		₹163,470,000,000	₹
1992-93	₹1,103,060,000,000	₹	₹		₹175,820,000,000	₹
1993-94	₹1,308,930,000,000	₹	₹		₹218,450,000,000	₹
1994-95	₹1,597,780,000,000	₹577,040,000,000	₹2,174,820,000,000	21.16%	₹	₹
1995-96	₹1,684,680,000,000	₹602,430,000,000	₹2,287,110,000,000	18.96%	₹268,790,000,000	₹125,500,000,000
1996-97	₹2,010,070,000,000	₹667,330,000,000	₹2,677,400,000,000	19.12%	₹294,980,000,000	₹142,330,000,000
1997-98	₹2,320,680,000,000	₹889,370,000,000	₹3,210,050,000,000	20.78%	₹360,990,000,000	₹183,660,000,000
1998-99	₹2,793,660,000,000	₹1,133,490,000,000	₹3,927,150,000,000	22.16%	₹412,000,000,000	₹210,630,000,000
1999-00	₹3,037,380,000,000	₹1,047,170,000,000	₹4,084,550,000,000	20.55%	₹493,530,000,000	₹256,920,000,000
2000-01	₹3,644,360,000,000	₹1,188,160,000,000	₹4,832,520,000,000	22.58%	₹544,610,000,000	₹269,490,000,000
2001-02	₹3,624,530,000,000	₹1,409,550,000,000	₹5,034,080,000,000	21.74%	₹570,000,000,000	₹305,230,000,000
2002-03	₹4,141,620,000,000	₹1,450,720,000,000	₹5,592,340,000,000	22.43%	₹560,000,000,000	₹446,180,000,000
2003-04	₹4,713,680,000,000	₹1,232,720,000,000	₹5,946,400,000,000	21.29%	₹603,000,000,000	₹447,070,000,000
2004-05	₹4,976,820,000,000	₹1,252,020,000,000	₹6,228,840,000,000	19.55%	₹770,000,000,000	₹465,140,000,000
2005-06	₹5,061,230,000,000	₹1,464,350,000,000	₹6,525,580,000,000	17.97%	₹817,000,000,000	₹468,740,000,000
2006-07	₹5,833,870,000,000	₹1,425,730,000,000	₹7,259,600,000,000	17.06%	₹860,000,000,000	₹534,630,000,000
2007-08	₹7,126,710,000,000	₹1,269,120,000,000	₹8,395,830,000,000	17.14%	₹925,000,000,000	₹697,420,000,000
2008-09	₹8,839,560,000,000	₹3,369,920,000,000	₹12,209,480,000,000	22.14%	₹1,142,230,000,000	₹1,297,080,000,000
2009-10	₹10,244,870,000,000	₹4,184,820,000,000	₹14,429,690,000,000	22.67%	₹1,417,810,000,000	₹1,413,510,000,000
2010-11	₹11,973,280,000,000	₹3,735,910,000,000	₹15,709,190,000,000	20.58%	₹1,541,170,000,000	₹1,734,200,000,000
2011-12	₹13,043,650,000,000	₹5,159,900,000,000	₹18,203,550,000,000	20.84%	₹1,709,130,000,000	₹2,179,410,000,000
2012-13	₹14,103,720,000,000	₹4,901,900,000,000	₹19,005,620,000,000	19.11%	₹1,817,760,000,000	₹2,570,790,000,000
2013-14	₹15,594,470,000,000	₹5,028,580,000,000	₹20,623,050,000,000	18.36%	₹2,034,990,000,000	₹2,546,320,000,000
2014-15	₹16,636,730,000,000	₹5,107,250,000,000	₹21,743,980,000,000	17.44%	₹2,186,940,000,000	₹2,582,580,000,000
2015-16	₹17,907,830,000,000	₹5,327,910,000,000	₹23,235,740,000,000	16.87%	₹2,258,950,000,000	₹2,418,330,000,000
2016-17	₹19,751,940,000,000	₹5,356,180,000,000	₹25,108,120,000,000	16.31%	₹2,517,810,000,000	₹2,040,250,000,000
2017-18	₹21,419,730,000,000	₹5,910,620,000,000	₹27,330,350,000,000	15.99%	₹2,765,740,000,000	₹1,911,830,000,000
2018-19	₹23,151,130,000,000	₹6,494,180,000,000	₹29,645,310,000,000	15.69%	₹2,908,020,000,000	₹1,967,690,000,000
2019-20	₹26,863,300,000,000	₹9,336,510,000,000	₹36,199,810,000,000	18.01%	₹3,186,650,000,000	₹2,283,410,000,000
2020-21	₹35,170,240,000,000	₹18,182,910,000,000	₹53,353,150,000,000	26.87%	₹3,400,940,000,000	₹7,077,070,000,000
2021-22	₹37,912,579,400,000	₹15,845,210,000,000	₹53,757,789,400,000	22.78%	₹3,665,460,000,000	₹4,461,500,000,000
2022-23	₹41,947,800,000,000	₹16,619,600,000,000	₹58,567,400,000,000	21.73%		
2023-24	₹44,434,470,000,000	₹16,546,430,000,000	₹60,980,900,000,000	20.18%		
2024-25 (Provisional)	₹48,200,000,000,000	₹16,133,120,000,000	₹64,333,120,000,000	19.85%		
2025-26						

== See also ==
- Military budget of India
- Railway budget of India
- Indian Economy
