= Parakala Prabhakar =

Indian economist and political commentator (born 1959)

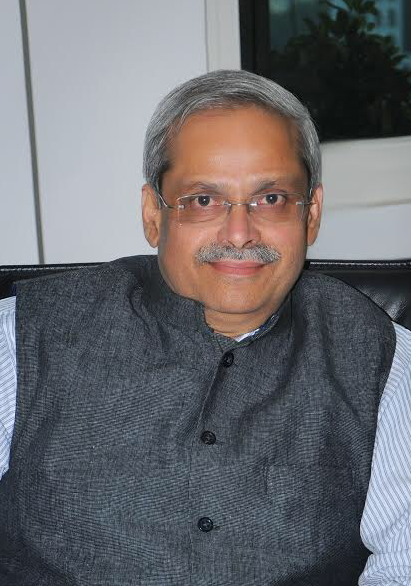
- Parakala in 2015
- Born: 2 January 1959 (age 67); Narsapuram, Andhra Pradesh, India
- Education: Andhra Loyola College (BA); Jawaharlal Nehru University (MA, MPhil); London School of Economics (PhD)
- Occupations: Political commentator; Economist
- Known for: Communication Advisor to the Government of Andhra Pradesh
- Spouse: Nirmala Sitharaman (m. 1986)
- Children: 1
- Website: www.parakala.org

Parakala Prabhakar (born 2 January 1959) is an Indian economist and political commentator. He served as communication advisor in the Government of Andhra Pradesh from July 2014 to June 2018. For several years, he presented current affairs discussion programme on Telugu television channels, such as Pratidhwani on ETV2 and Namaste Andhra Pradesh on NTV.

He was formerly a spokesperson of Praja Rajyam Party. He is the husband of Nirmala Sitharaman, union Minister of Finance and Minister of Corporate Affairs.

He is also the author of the book The Crooked Timber of New India - Essays on a Republic in Crisis.

== Early life and education ==
Prabhakar was born in a prominent Telugu-speaking family in Narsapuram, Andhra Pradesh. He belongs to Congress members' family. His mother, Parakala Kalikamba, was a Member of Legislative Assembly in Andhra Pradesh, while his father, Parakala Seshavatharam, was a long-time legislator from Narasapuram and served in three successive cabinets in the state of Andhra Pradesh in the 1970s and early 1980s.

Prabhakar graduated with a Bachelor of Arts (B.A.) from the Andhra Loyola College, Vijayawada. He then did his Master of Arts (M.A.) and Master of Philosophy (M.Phil.) from the Jawaharlal Nehru University, New Delhi. He later studied at the London School of Economics and was awarded a Doctor of Philosophy in economics from University of London in 1991.

Prabhakar married Nirmala Sitharaman in 1986, who became the Minister of Finance and Corporate Affairs of the Government of India in Narendra Modi's cabinet. They have a daughter.

== Political career ==
He was one of the founding members of the Praja Rajyam Party and was appointed as a spokesperson of the party. However, in April 2009, he quit the party, a few months before the state election, citing disagreements with the party's functioning.
