= 2017 Union budget of India =

Government budget

2017 Union Budget of India
- Emblem of India
- Submitted to: Parliament of India
- Presented: 1 February 2017
- Passed: 1 February 2017
- Country: India
- Parliament: 16th (Lok Sabha)
- Party: Bharatiya Janata Party (BJP)
- Finance minister: Arun Jaitley
- Total revenue: ₹2,146,735 crore (equivalent to ₹33 trillion or US$350 billion in 2026)
- Total expenditures: ₹2,531,762 crore (equivalent to ₹39 trillion or US$410 billion in 2026) (grand total)
- Program spending: ₹2,146,734 crore (equivalent to ₹33 trillion or US$350 billion in 2026) (through budget)
- Debt payment: ₹523,078 crore (equivalent to ₹8.0 trillion or US$86 billion in 2026)
- Deficit: ₹546,532 crore (equivalent to ₹8.4 trillion or US$89 billion in 2026) (3.2%) (Fiscal deficit) ₹321,163 crore (equivalent to ₹4.9 trillion or US$53 billion in 2026) (1.9%) (Revenue deficit)
- Website: www.indiabudget.gov.in

The 2017 Union Budget of India is the Union budget of India for the financial year 2017-2018. It was presented before the parliament on 1 February 2017 by the Finance Minister of India, Arun Jaitley with ₹21.47 lakh crore (US$336.39 billion) budget size. The printing of the budget documents began with a traditional Halwa ceremony in January 2017.

Further, Railway budget of India was merged with the Union budget and classification of plan and non-plan expenditure was done away starting from the year 2017 by Narendra Modi led Government of India.

== Background ==
It was the first budget after major changes in the Indian economy like Goods and Services Tax (India) and 2016 Indian banknote demonetisation. The core objective of the budget for 2017-18 was to "Transform, Energise and Clean (TEC) India":

- Transform the quality of governance and quality of life of our people
- Energise various sections of society, especially the youth and the vulnerable, and enable them to unleash their true potential
- Clean the country from the evils of corruption, black money and non-transparent political funding.

== Highlights ==
- Tax rate for individuals earning ₹2.5-₹5 lakhs reduced to 5%.
- 0% effective tax rate (after rebates) for income up to ₹3 lakhs.
- All other categories will also get uniform benefit of ₹12,500.
- Surcharge of 10% of tax payable on categories of individuals whose annual taxable income is between 50 lakhs and 1 crore. 15% surcharge for more than 1 crore.
- One page Income tax return to be filed for persons having Taxable income up to 5 lakhs other than income from Profits and Gains from Business or profession (PGBP).
- Maximum limit for audit of specified assesses who opt for presumptive income (Section 44AD of Income Tax Act) scheme increased from 1 crore to 2 crores.
- No transaction above 3 lakhs through cash is permitted subject to certain exceptions
- To promote transparency in electoral funding, maximum donation of ₹2,000 in cash is restricted from one person.
- Foreign Investment Promotion Board (FIPB) will be abolished
- Allocation of ₹23,000 crore to the Pradhan Mantri Gramin Awas Yojana
- The Finance Minister of India has stated that "Consumer price index inflation is expected to remain within RBI’s mandated range of 2% to 6%".
- FDI increased from ₹1,07,000 crore in the first half of last year to ₹1,45,000 crore in the first half of 2016–17.
- As stated by finance minister Foreign-exchange reserves have reached 361 billion US Dollars as on 20 January 2017.
- ₹48,000 crore allocated towards the Mahatma Gandhi National Rural Employment Guarantee Act

== Finance Bill ==
Finance Minister Arun Jaitley presented Finance Bill on 21 March 2017. He has suggested major overhaul in the bill. Forty changes have been suggested by him in the existing legislations. Some of the major changes are

- The cash transaction limit will be brought down to Rs. 2 lakh from the erstwhile Rs. 3 lakh limit.
- Aadhaar card should become mandatory for filing IT returns.
- PAN Card would only be issued upon producing the Aadhar card.
- The disclosure of political donations made by companies will be made mandatory.
