= 2012 Union budget of India =

Government budget

2012 Union Budget of India
- Emblem of India
- Submitted: March 16, 2012
- Submitted by: Pranab Mukherjee, Finance Minister
- Country: India
- Party: INC
- Website: http://www.indiabudget.nic.in Official Site

The 2012 Union budget of India was presented by the finance minister of India Pranab Mukherjee on March 16, 2012. This budget was presented in a challenging backdrop of slowing domestic growth, high inflation, and global economic uncertainty stemming from the Eurozone crisis. The budget aimed to revive growth, control inflation, and move towards fiscal consolidation.

== Background ==
The Indian economy had experienced a slowdown in the fiscal year 2011–12, with GDP growth decelerating from the preceding years. The Economic Survey 2011–12, tabled just before the budget, estimated growth at 6.9%, a significant drop from the 8.4% recorded in 2010–11. Persistently high inflation, particularly in food prices, remained a major concern and leading to protests over corruption and price hikes. The fiscal deficit was also under pressure, exceeding the initial budget estimates for 2011-12 along with subsidy spending reaching up to 2.5% of the GDP. Globally, the sovereign debt crisis in Europe added to economic uncertainty and impacted capital flows. The government faced criticism over policy inaction, sometimes termed 'policy paralysis', which was seen as hindering investment and growth.

== Highlights ==
Notable changes included:

- No change in corporate tax rates
- Exemption limit on individual tax raised to 200,000₹
- Service tax raised from 10% to 12%
- Defence spending increased by 18%
- Excise duty raised from 10% to 12%
- Full exemption on import duty of thermal coal for power plants
- Customs duty on gold doubled

== Reactions ==
The budget proposal was widely criticized to be a "play-it-safe", "too-conservative" budget with no big reforms or policy changes.
