= Nirmala Sitharaman =

Indian economist and politician (born 1959)

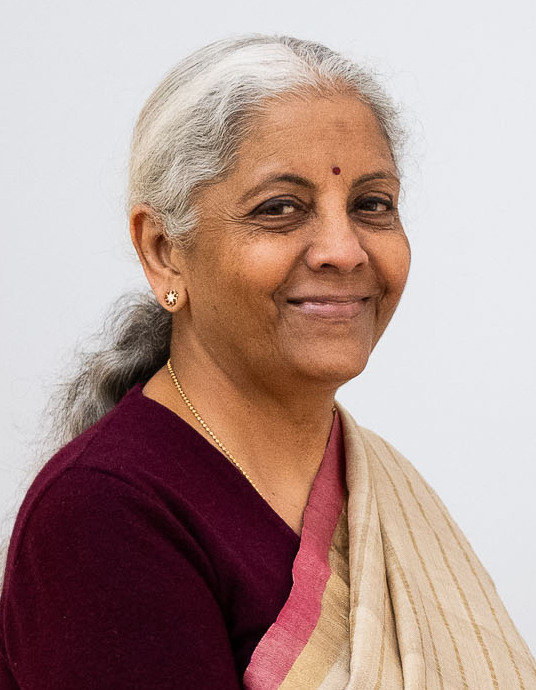
- Sitharaman in April 2025

30th Minister of Finance & 32nd Minister of Corporate Affairs
- Incumbent
- Assumed office 30 May 2019
- President: Ram Nath Kovind; Droupadi Murmu
- Prime Minister: Narendra Modi
- Preceded by: Arun Jaitley

28th Minister of Defence
- In office 3 September 2017 – 30 May 2019
- President: Ram Nath Kovind
- Prime Minister: Narendra Modi
- Preceded by: Arun Jaitley
- Succeeded by: Rajnath Singh
Other ministerial positions
Minister of State (Independent Charge) for Commerce and Industry
In office 26 May 2014 – 3 September 2017
| Prime Minister | Narendra Modi |
| Preceded by | Anand Sharma |
| Succeeded by | Suresh Prabhu |
Minister of State for Finance
In office 26 May 2014 – 9 November 2014
| Prime Minister | Narendra Modi |
| Minister | Arun Jaitley |
| Preceded by | Shripad Naik |
| Succeeded by | Jayant Sinha |
Minister of State for Corporate Affairs
In office 26 May 2014 – 9 November 2014
| Prime Minister | Narendra Modi |
| Minister | Arun Jaitley |
| Preceded by | Office established |
| Succeeded by | Arjun Ram Meghwal |

Member of Parliament, Rajya Sabha
- Incumbent
- Assumed office 1 July 2016
- Preceded by: M. Venkaiah Naidu
- Constituency: Karnataka
- In office 26 June 2014 – 21 June 2016
- Preceded by: N. Janardhana Reddy
- Succeeded by: Suresh Prabhu
- Constituency: Andhra Pradesh

Personal details
- Born: 18 August 1959 (age 67) Madurai, Madras State, India (present-day Tamil Nadu)
- Party: Bharatiya Janata Party
- Spouse: Parakala Prabhakar (m. 1986)
- Children: 1
- Education: Seethalakshmi Ramaswami College (BA); Jawaharlal Nehru University (MA, MPhil)
- Occupation: Politician
- Website: nirmalasitharaman.in

Nirmala Sitharaman (born 18 August 1959) is an Indian economist and politician who is serving as the 30th Minister of Finance and 32nd Minister of Corporate Affairs since 2019. She previously served as the Minister of Defence from 2017 to 2019. A member of the Bharatiya Janata Party (BJP), she was elected as a member of the Rajya Sabha, the upper house of the Indian Parliament, from Karnataka in July 2016.

Born in a Tamil family in 1959 at Madurai, Sitharaman obtained her Bachelor of Arts in Economics from Seethalakshmi Ramaswami College in 1980, and a Master of Arts in Economics and Master of Philosophy from the Jawaharlal Nehru University in 1984. She briefly worked in various roles in the United Kingdom before returning to India. In 2003, she was appointed as a member of the National Commission for Women from 2003, and served till 2005.

Sitharaman joined the BJP in 2008 and served as a national spokesperson for the party from 2010 to 2014. In May 2014, she was appointed as the minister of state with an independent charge of the ministry of commerce and industry in the first Modi ministry, and held the position till September 2017. She also held the role of minister of state in the finance and corporate affairs ministries briefly from May to November 2014. After assuming office, she was elected to the Rajya Sabha from Andhra Pradesh in June 2014. On 3 September 2017, she was appointed as the 28th defence minister.

On 30 May 2019, Sitharaman was appointed as the minister of finance and corporate affairs in the second Modi ministry. After serving for five years, she was reappointed to the position in the third Modi ministry in June 2024, after the National Democratic Alliance won the 2024 Indian general election. She is the first woman to hold the positions of minister of defence and minister of finance full-time. (Note: Indira Gandhi, who was the Indian prime minister, held additional responsibilities as the minister of finance in 1970, and the minister of defence from 1980 to 1982.) In July 2025, she became the longest continuous-serving Indian finance minister, surpassing C. D. Deshmukh. In February 2026, she became the first Indian finance minister to present the union budget for nine consecutive times.

== Early life and education ==
Sitharaman was born into a Tamil Brahmin family in Madurai, Tamil Nadu, to Savitri and Narayanan Sitharaman. Her father worked with the Indian Railways. She studied at Sacred Heart Convent Anglo-Indian School in Viluppuram and then at the Vidyodaya School in Chennai. She passed her SSLC at St. Philomena's School and the higher secondary at Holy Cross School in Tiruchirappalli.

Sitharaman obtained a Bachelor of Arts degree in economics from the Seethalakshmi Ramaswami College, Tiruchirapalli, in 1980, and a Master of Arts degree in economics and a Master of Philosophy from the Jawaharlal Nehru University in 1984. She later enrolled in a Ph.D. program in economics at the university but later left this program and then moved to London, U.K., when her husband secured a scholarship at London School of Economics.

== Early career ==
After moving to London, Sitharaman initially worked as a salesperson at Habitat, a home decor store in Regent Street. She later served as an assistant to an economist at the Agricultural Engineers Association. She has also worked as a senior manager of R&D at PricewaterhouseCoopers and at the BBC World Service briefly. After returning to India in 1991, she served as the deputy director of the Centre for Public Policy Studies in Hyderabad. In 2004, she was one of the founding directors of Pranava, a private co-educational school in Hyderabad. She was appointed as a member of the National Commission for Women in 2003, and served in the position till 2005.

== Political career ==
Sitharaman joined the Bharatiya Janata Party (BJP) in 2006 and was appointed to its national executive committee in 2008. She was appointed as a national spokesperson of the party in 2010, and served in the role till 2014.

=== Minister of state ===
After the BJP won the 2014 Indian general election, Narendra Modi was sworn in as the prime minister. On 26 May 2014, Modi inducted Sitharaman in his first cabinet as the minister of state with an independent charge of the ministry of commerce and industry. She also held additional portfolios of minister of state in the finance and corporate affairs ministries briefly from May to November 2014. As mandated by the Constitution of India, (Note: As per the Constitution of India, a union minister should be a member of the Indian parliament. If they are not a member during their appointment, then they must get elected within a period of six months from the date of appointment.) she was elected to the Rajya Sabha, the upper house of the Indian parliament, from Andhra Pradesh, in June 2014. In May 2016, she was one of the 12 candidates nominated by the BJP to contest the Rajya Sabha elections on 11 June. She successfully contested her seat from Karnataka and re-elected to the parliament.

=== Cabinet minister ===
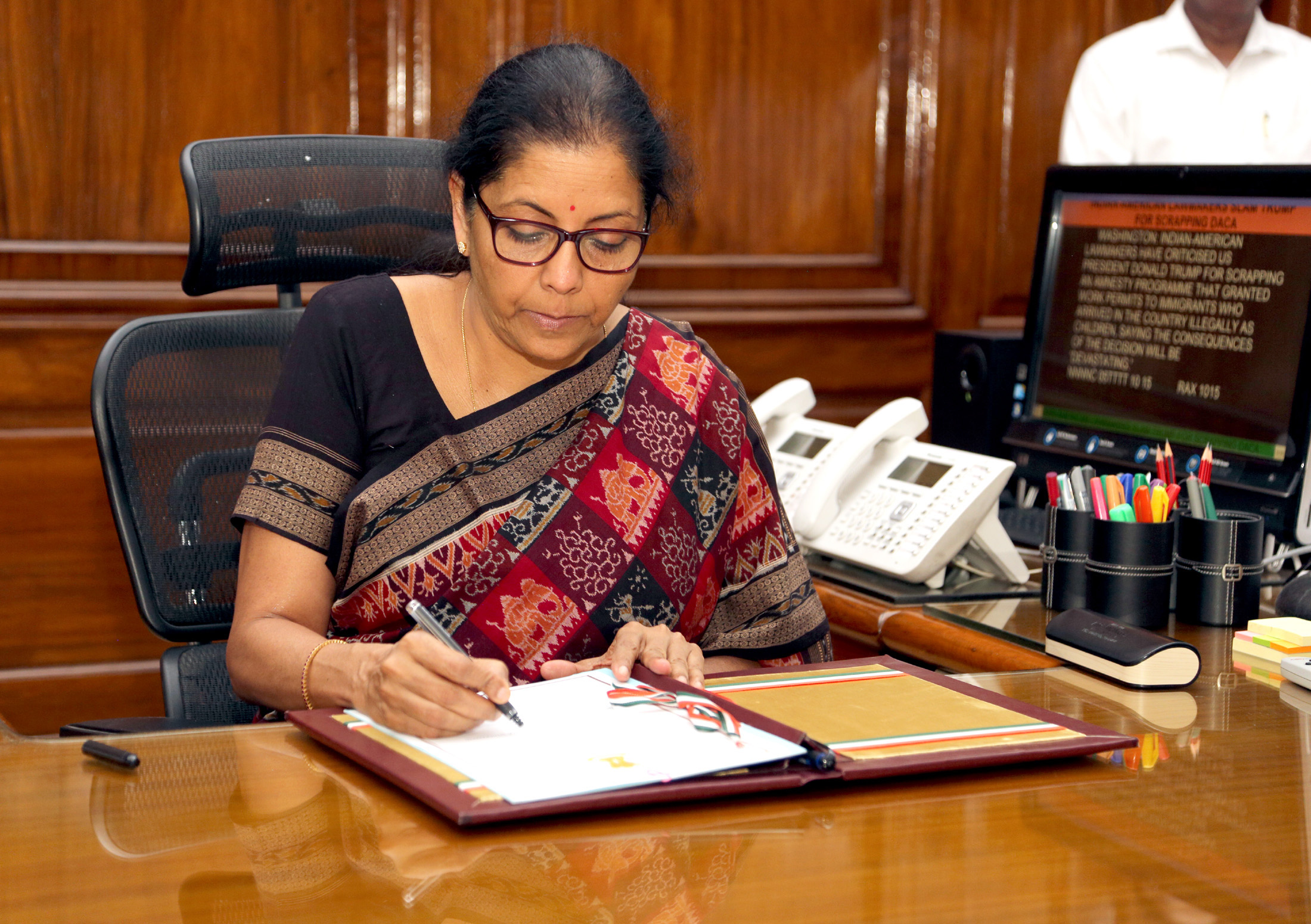
Sitharaman taking charge as defence minister on 7 September 2017

On 3 September 2017, Sitharaman was appointed as the minister of defence, being only the second woman after Indira Gandhi to hold the post, and the first full-time female defence minister. During her tenure, the Indian Armed Forces conducted the Balakot airstrike inside Pakistan on 26 February 2019, in response to the earlier attack on an Indian Army convoy on 14 February. Sitharaman later said that the attack targeted militant camps and no civilian was harmed, while not giving details on the damages and number of deaths caused by the strikes.

After BJP won a majority in the 2019 Indian general election, Seetharaman was appointed as the minister of finance and corporate affairs in the Second Modi ministry on 30 May 2019. She is the second woman to hold the position after Indira Gandhi, and India's first full-time female finance minister. She presented her maiden budget in the Indian parliament on 5 July 2019. During the COVID-19 pandemic, she was in-charge of the COVID-19 Economic Response Task Force. After the 2024 Indian general election, she was reappointed as the finance minister in the Third Modi ministry in June 2024. In June 2025, a Delhi court issued a notice to her in connection with a criminal defamation plea filed by Lipika Mitra, the wife of former Aam Aadmi Party minister Somnath Bharti.

In July 2025, she became the longest continuous serving Indian finance minister surpassing C. D. Deshmukh. During her tenure as the finance minister, India became the fifth largest economy in the world in 2022, and the fourth largest in 2025. In February 2026, she presented the union budget for the ninth consecutive year, became the first Indian finance minister to do so.

== Electoral history ==
| Position | Party | State/UT | From | To | Tenure | Ref. |
|---|---|---|---|---|---|---|
| Member of Parliament, Rajya Sabha (1st Term) | BJP | Andhra Pradesh | 26 June 2014 | 17 June 2016 | 1 year, 357 days | |
| Member of Parliament, Rajya Sabha (2nd Term) | BJP | Karnataka | 1 July 2016 | 30 June 2022 | 10 years, 113 days | |
| Member of Parliament, Rajya Sabha (3rd Term) | BJP | Karnataka | 1 July 2022 | present | 10 years, 113 days | |

== Awards and honours ==
The Jawaharlal Nehru University conferred her the distinguished alumni award in 2019. In 2025, Forbes ranked her 24th among the 100 most powerful women in the world. This was her seventh consecutive time on the list, after being placed 34th in 2019, 41st in 2020, 37th on the list in 2021, 36th in 2022, 32nd in 2023 and 28th in 2024. She was awarded the business reformer of the year at the Economic Times Awards in 2021.

== Personal life ==
Sitharaman met Parakala Prabhakar, who hailed from Narsapuram, Andhra Pradesh, while studying at the Jawaharlal Nehru University. They married in 1986 and have a daughter Vangmayi, a journalist. Prabhakar served as the communications advisor to the Government of Andhra Pradesh from 2014 to 2018.

== See also ==
- List of female defence ministers
- List of female finance ministers

== Notes ==
Political offices
| Preceded by Anand Sharma | Minister of Commerce and Industry; 2014–2017 | Succeeded by Suresh Prabhu |
| Preceded by Arun Jaitley | Minister of Defence; 2017–2019 | Succeeded by Rajnath Singh |
| Preceded by Arun Jaitley | Minister of Finance; 31 May 2019 – present | Incumbent |
| Preceded by Arun Jaitley | Minister of Corporate Affairs; 31 May 2019 – present | Incumbent |
