= 2015 in India =

- Centuries: 19th; 20th; 21st
- Decades: 1990s; 2000s; 2010s; 2020s
- See also: List of years in India; Timeline of Indian history

The following lists events that happened during 2015 in the Republic of India.

== Incumbents ==
Photo	Post	Name
	President	Pranab Mukherjee
	Vice President	Mohammad Hamid Ansari
	Prime Minister	Narendra Modi
	Chief Justice	H. L. Dattu (till 2 December)
	Chief Justice	T. S. Thakur (starting 3 December)

=== Governors ===
Post	Name
Andhra Pradesh	E. S. L. Narasimhan
Arunachal Pradesh	Nirbhay Sharma (until 12 May); Jyoti Prasad Rajkhowa (starting 12 May)
Assam	Padmanabha Acharya
Bihar	Keshari Nath Tripathi (until 15 August); Ram Nath Kovind (starting 15 August)
Chhattisgarh	Balram Das Tandon
Goa	Mridula Sinha
Gujarat	Om Prakash Kohli
Haryana	Kaptan Singh Solanki
Himachal Pradesh	Acharya Devvrat
Jammu and Kashmir	Narinder Nath Vohra
Jharkhand	Syed Ahmed (until 12 May); Draupadi Murmu (starting 12 May)
Karnataka	Hansraj Bhardwaj (until 29 June); Konijeti Rosaiah (29 June-1 September); Vajubhai Rudabhai Vala (starting 1 September)
Kerala	P. Sathasivam
Madhya Pradesh	Ram Naresh Yadav
Maharashtra	V. Shanmuganathan
Manipur	Krishan Kant Paul (until 15 May); Syed Ahmed (16 May-27 September); V. Shanmuganathan (starting 30 September)
Meghalaya	Krishan Kant Paul (until 6 January); Keshari Nath Tripathi (6 January-19 May); V. Shanmuganathan (starting 30 September)
Mizoram	Krishan Kant Paul (until 8 January); Keshari Nath Tripathi (4 April-28 May); Nirbhay Sharma (starting 26 May)
Nagaland	Padmanabha Acharya
Odisha	S. C. Jamir
Punjab	Banwarilal Purohit
Rajasthan	Kalyan Singh
Sikkim	Shriniwas Dadasaheb Patil
Tamil Nadu	Konijeti Rosaiah
Tripura	Padmanabha Acharya (until 19 May); Tathagata Roy (starting 20 May)
Uttar Pradesh	Ram Naik
Uttarakhand	Aziz Qureshi (until 7 January); Krishan Kant Paul (starting 7 January)
West Bengal	Keshari Nath Tripathi

== Elections ==
=== State elections ===
2015 state elections in India
State	Preceding Party	Preceding Chief Minister	New elected party	New Chief Minister	Competitors	Reports
Delhi	Aam Aadmi Party	Arvind Kejriwal (resigned February 2014) Najeeb Jung (Lieutenant Governor)	Aam Aadmi Party	Arvind Kejriwal	Kiran Bedi; Ajay Maken	Report
Bihar	Janta Dal United	Nitish Kumar				Report

== Events ==
- National income - ₹137,718,739 million

=== January - March ===
- 1 January – NITI Aayog was established to replace Planning Commission of India.
- 2–3 January – Gyan Sangam, a two-day retreat took place at Pune, it was attended by Prime Minister Narendra Modi, Finance Minister Arun Jaitley, Reserve Bank of India Governor Raghuram Rajan and chiefs of various financial institutions.
- 8–9 January – Annual Pravasi Bharatiya Divas conference took place in Gandhinagar, Gujarat.
- 13 January – 32 died in Malihabad, Uttar Pradesh after drinking hooch.
- 23 January – Ara Civil Court bombing killed 3 when a bomb went off in a woman's purse at the Ara civil court.
- 26 January – Republic Day celebrations were held, US President Barack Obama was the chief guest.
- 27 January – M. N. Rai, a colonel in the Rashtriya Rifles and Sanjeev Kumar Singh, a head constable in the Special Operations Group, died in a gun battle in Tral in Pulwama district. Two militants were also killed. M. N. Rai had been awarded the Yudh Seva medal on 26 January.
- 31 January – The Agni-V was test launched from a canister in Wheeler Island, suitable for road or rail mobile launch vehicles.
- 7 February – Polling for the New Delhi state elections held.
- 10 February – Delhi Legislative Assembly election's results announced with Aam Aadmi Party securing 67 of 70 seats.
- 13 February – A grenade attack by the United Liberation Front of Assam on a family in the town of Sepon in India's Assam state killed two people.
- 14 February – A house under construction collapsed in the Indian city of Mughalsarai in the state of Uttar Pradesh killing twelve people and injuring two.
- 15 February – The number of reported deaths of swine flu in India reached 585, with Rajasthan, Gujarat, Madhya Pradesh and Maharashtra being the worst-affected with reported death tolls at 165, 144, 76 and 58 respectively.
- 16 February – Govind Pansare, a CPI politician and his wife were shot at in Kolhapur, Maharashtra. Govind Pansare later died on 20 February.
- 18 February – The Cabinet Committee on Security approves the construction of seven stealth frigates and six nuclear submarines for the Indian Navy.
- 18–22 February – The 10th edition of Aero India took place at Yelahanka Air Force Station near Bangalore.
- 23 February – Budget session of the Parliament began with the President's address to the joint session of Lok Sabha and Rajya Sabha.
- 28 February – Union Budget presented to the Parliament by Finance Minister Arun Jaitley.
- 3 March – National Electoral Roll Purification and Authentication Programme launched by the Election Commission of India.
- 17 March – Supreme Court of India rejected the classification of Jat people as Other Backward Classes.
- 18 March – Beyond visual range (BVR) air-to-air missile, Astra, was successfully test fired from a Su-30MKI in test range in Chandipur, Orissa.
- 23 March – Amaravathi was announced to be name of the new capital of Andhra Pradesh, to be built near Thullur.
- 24 March – Supreme Court of India declared Section 66A of the Information Technology Act, 2000 unconstitutional.
- 26 March – National Institute of Ocean Technology (NIOT) unveiled Polar Remotely Operated Vehicle (PROVe), which would be used to study the monsoon.
- 27 March – Bharat Ratna was awarded to former Prime Minister Atal Bihari Vajpayee
- 28 March – ISRO placed Indian Regional Navigation Satellite System (IRNSS) 1-D satellite in orbit by a PSLV C-27 launch vehicle.
- 29 March – India began to evacuate its citizens from Yemen.
- 30 March – Bharat Ratna awarded to freedom fighter Madan Mohan Malaviya posthumously.

=== April - June ===
- 1 April – Faster Adoption and Manufacturing of Hybrid and Electric vehicles in India (FAME India) scheme was launched by the government to boost electric and hybrid vehicle sales.
- 5 April – Petroleum and Natural Gas Minister, Dharmendra Pradhan, launched the Give up LPG subsidy campaign urging rich people to give up LPG subsidy.
- 7 April – Police killed 20 Red sanders, Pterocarpus santalinus smugglers in Chittoor district.
- 8 April –
  - The Padma awards were given at the Rashtrapati Bhawan. Among the 50 recipients were actor Amitabh Bachchan, actor Dilip Kumar, nuclear scientist M.R. Srinivasan, mathematician Manjul Bhargava, computer scientist Vijay P. Bhatkar, Hindu spiritual guru Swami Satyamitranand and Aga Khan IV.
  - The Micro Units Development and Refinance Agency Bank (MUDRA Bank) was launched by Prime Minister Narendra Modi. The financial institution aims to provide financing to small entrepreneurs.
- 10 April – India completed evacuating citizens from Yemen, and announced the closure of embassy. In all, about 4,640 Indians and 960 nationals from 41 other countries were evacuated.
- 11 April – Maoists killed 7 of personnel of Chhattisgarh's Special Task Force in south Bastar.
- 25 April – April 2015 Nepal earthquake, a 7.9 Richter scale earthquake occurred in Nepal. Parts of North India were affected.
- 1 May – One of India's most wanted Maoist leaders Roopesh and his wife were arrested in Coimbatore.
- 3 May – Militants ambushed and killed 8 personnel of Assam Rifles in Mon district of Nagaland.
- 5 May – The Akash missile was inducted into the Indian Army.
- 6 May – India and Iran signed an agreement which would allow India to develop the Port of Chabahar. The deal was signed during Transport Minister Nitin Gadkari's Iran visit.
- 7 May – The Parliament passed the Constitution (119th Amendment) Bill, 2013. It would allow India to solve its territorial disputes with Bangladesh.
- 9 May – Prime Minister Narendra Modi launched 3 large-scale social security schemes, Pradhan Mantri Suraksha Bima Yojana, Pradhan Mantri Jeevan Jyoti Bima Yojana, and Atal Pension Yojana, at Nazrul Mancha in Kolkata.
- 9 May – Maoists released about 250 hostages they had taken a day before in Sukma district. One hostage was killed.
- 11 May –
  - India nominated K. V. Kamath as the head of the New Development Bank.
  - All India Anna Dravida Munnetra Kazhagam leader Jayalalithaa was acquitted in a disproportionate assets case by the Karnataka High Court.
- 13 May - Supreme Court of India laid down guidelines for publication of government advertisements and suggests that only pictures of President of India, Prime Minister of India, and Chief Justice of India be used in such ads.
- 14 May - Six dalits massacred over land dispute at Dangawas, Nagaur district.
- 24 May – The reported death toll from 2015 India heat wave reached 335 people.
- 27 May - Chief Minister of Tripura Manik Sarkar withdraws Armed Forces (Special Powers) Act that's in force in Tripura since 1997.
- 3 June - Maggi noodles banned due to food safety concerns in India
- 4 June – 2015 Manipur ambush: 20 army personnel were killed and 11 were injured in a militant attack in Manipur. The responsibility for the attack was claimed by National Socialist Council of Nagaland-Khaplang.
- 8 June – A Shahjahanpur-based journalist Jagendra Singh died from burn injuries in a hospital in Lucknow. He had allegedly been set on fire by the local police on 1 June for making Facebook posts against the Uttar Pradesh Minister for Dairy Development Rammurti Singh Verma.
- 9 June – 2015 Indian counter-insurgency operation in Myanmar: Indian army attacked two militant camps across the Myanmar border in response to the 2015 Manipur ambush.
- 15 June – The Supreme Court of India directed the Central Board of Secondary Education to conduct the All India Pre Medical Test again due to allegations of cheating.
- 17 June – 94 people died in Malad area of Mumbai after drinking hooch.
- 19 June – Sandeep Kothari, a journalist, was kidnapped from Katangi area of Balaghat district in Madhya Pradesh and killed for refusing to withdraw an illegal mining case from the court. His body was recovered in Wardha district of Maharashtra on 20 June.
- 21 June – The first International Yoga Day was held.
- 29 June – India signed the legal framework of the Asian Infrastructure Investment Bank and pledged US$8.3 billion towards it.

=== July - September ===
- 1 July – The Digital India programme was launched by Prime Minister Narendra Modi.
- 9 July – The Ministry of Home Affairs declared Nagaland a "disturbed" region under Armed Forces (Special Powers) Act, 1958 for one year, starting from 30 June 2015.
- 10 July
  - Shanghai Cooperation Organisation (SCO) decided to induct India as a full member.
  - ISRO launched 5 UK satellites with a total payload of 1,440 kg using the PSLV-C28 launch vehicle.
- 15 July – 29 people died in a stampede at Rajahmundry in Andhra Pradesh during the Godavari Maha Pushkaram.
- 21 July – Surakshit Khadya Abhiyan was launched by Minister of Consumer Affairs, Food and Public Distribution, Ram Vilas Paswan. The campaign aims to promote food safety in India.
- 23 July – Two Anglo-Indian members were nominated by President Pranab Mukherjee to the Lok Sabha. The two nominated members were George Baker, a BJP leader and actor from West Bengal, and Richard Hay, an economics professor from Kerala.
- 27 July –
  - Terrorists attacked a police station in Gurdaspur in Punjab. Nine were killed which included three terrorists.
  - Ram Sevak Sharma was appointed the chairman of the Telecom Regulatory Authority of India.
  - Great scientist and former President A.P.J. Abdul Kalam died while giving a lecture in Indian Institute of Management, Shillong due to Cardiac arrest.
- 30 July – Yakub Memon is executed for his alleged role in the 1993 Mumbai blasts.
- 1 August – Landslide killed at least 20 people in a village in Chandel district, Manipur.
- 6 August – Indian forces captured a terrorist, Mohammed Naved, allegedly from Faisalabad, Pakistan, following an attack on a convoy on the Jammu-Srinagar highway.
- 8 August – Godman Sarathi Baba was arrested following a TV channel exposé and subsequent protests in Odisha.
- 10 August –
  - At least 10 people died and over 50 were injured in a stampede at a Shiva temple in Deoghar district of Jharkhand.
  - Rajasthan High Court declared the Jain ritual called Santhara to be illegal.
- 24 August - A youth from Muslim community was stripped, tied to a pole and assaulted by Bajrang Dal in Mangalore.
- 26 August – Demonstrations demanding reservations for the Patel community began in Gujarat. The following clashes killed at least 8. Army was deployed in select areas.
- 27 August –
  - ISRO successfully launched GSAT-6 using the GSLV D-6 launch vehicle.
  - Indian forces captured a terrorist in Baramulla district, Jammu and Kashmir, following a gunfight. The terrorist, Sajjad alias Abu Ubadullah, allegedly hailed from Muzaffargarh district of Balochistan, Pakistan.
- 12 September – A gas cylinder explosion killed at least 80 in Petlawad, Madhya Pradesh.
- 14 September – Department of Industrial Policy and Promotion (DIPP) released a report ranking the states on ease of doing business and regulatory reforms.
- 16 September – Central Government banned the National Socialist Council of Nagaland (Khaplang) for five years.
- 19 September – Burhan Bashir Bhat, 3, and his father Bashir Ahmad Bhat, were murdered.
- 25 September – Anti-India protests erupted in Nepal over the blockade of trade routes. Madhesi and Tharu ethnic groups blocked the routes, by doing a dharna on the no man's land, after Nepal's new constitution was deemed unfavorable to the ethnic groups living in the Terai plains. Nepali politicians said that such a blockade is not possible without the approval of the Indian government.
- 28 September –
  - India's first space observatory Astrosat launched.
  - 2015 Dadri lynching in Uttar Pradesh

=== October - December ===
- 2 October – Environment Minister Prakash Javadekar announced India's Intended Nationally Determined Contributions for the United Nations Framework Convention on Climate Change. It set a target of reducing its emission intensity by 33–35%, by 2030 from 2005 levels.
- 9 October
  - Madhya Pradesh declared 19,951 villages in 114 tehsils to be drought affected.
  - Bombay High Court judged in favour of Vodafone in the alleged tax avoidance case.
- 12 – 22 October – India and China conducted joint anti-terror drills in Kunming, China.
- 15 – 19 October – India, US and Japan conducted the 19th Exercise Malabar in the Bay of Bengal.
- 16 October
  - The Supreme Court of India declared National Judicial Appointments Commission (NJAC) to be unconstitutional.
  - Maharashtra declared that 14,708 of its 40,053 villages were facing drought-like conditions.
  - Telecom Regulatory Authority of India (TRAI) mandated that the telecom operator will have to pay ₹1 for each dropped call to the subscriber, from 1 January 2016 onward.
- 19 October – The retail price of Toor dal reached ₹200 (US$2.10) per kg. Other pulses also reached high prices. Several state governments were selling imported pulses at subsidised prices in order to curb the inflated prices.
- 20 October – The Government of Maharashtra invoked the Maharashtra Prevention of Dangerous Activities of Slumlords, Bootleggers, Drug Offenders and Dangerous Persons Act, 1981, and Maharashtra Control of Organised Crime Act, 1999 against hoarders of pulses and edible oil.
- 21 October – Home Minister Rajnath Singh inaugurated the Indian Police Foundation (IPF) and the Indian Police Institute (IPI) in New Delhi.
- 22 October – Prime Minister Narendra Modi laid the foundation stone of Amaravati, the new capital of Andhra Pradesh.
- 24 October
  - Ministry of Defence approved the induction of women as combat pilots in the Indian Air Force.
  - The Government of Odisha began raiding pulses godowns to check hoarders.
- 26 October – The third India–Africa Forum Summit began in New Delhi.
- 27 October – Finance Minister Arun Jaitley launched the e-Sahayog of the Income Tax Department. The facility will allow the tax office to remotely notify the payer in case of mismatch in filings.
- 31 October – The birth anniversary of Sardar Vallabhbhai Patel was observed as Rashtriya Ekta Diwas (National Unity Day).
- 1 November - Premiere of India's popular show Naagin (2015 TV series)
- 26 November – Samvidhan Divas (Constitution Day) to be observed.
- 22 December – The Beechcraft King Air plane chartered by India's Border Security Force (BSF) crashed on take-off near the Delhi airport, killing 10 people.

== Publications ==
- "Scion of Ikshvaku" by Amish Tripathi
- "Sleeping on Jupiter" by Anuradha Roy

== Deaths ==
=== January ===
- 2 January
  - Mrunalini Devi Puar, 83, academic and educationist (born 1931)
  - Vasant Gowarikar, 81, scientist and ISRO chairman (born 1933).
- 4 January
  - Chitresh Das, 70, Kathak dance instructor and choreographer (born 1944).
  - Ahuti Prasad, 57, Telugu actor (born 1958).
  - Upendra Trivedi, 78, Gujarati actor and director (born 1936).
- 5 January – Ganesh Patro, 69, Telugu playwright and screenwriter (born 1945).
- 7 January
  - Subhas Anandan, 67, Indian-origin Singaporean criminal lawyer, notable for representing Quan Yi Fong and others (born 1947).
  - B. S. Abdur Rahman, 87, business executive, educationist and philanthropist; founder of B. S. Abdur Rahman University (born 1927).
- 9 January – Jasodhara Bagchi, 77, women's rights activist (born 1937).
- 13 January – Hara Patnaik, 56, Oriya actor and film director (born 1958).
- 15 January – Rameshwar Thakur, 88, politician, Governor of Odisha (2004–2006), Andhra Pradesh (2006–2007) and Karnataka (2007–2009); (born 1927).
- 16 January – Ghelubhai Nayak, 91, social activist and freedom fighter (born 1924).
- 17 January – Gobinda Haldar, 84, Bengali lyricist and composer (born 1930).
- 18 January – Harish Chandra Srivastava, 90, politician (born 1925).
- 19 January – Rajni Kothari, 86, political scientist (born 1928)
- 23 January – M. S. Narayana, 63, Telugu actor (born 1951)
- 24 January – V. S. Raghavan, 89, Tamil actor (born 1925)
- 25 January – Sarojini Mahishi, 88, translator and politician.
- 26 January – R. K. Laxman, 94, cartoonist (born 1921)
- 27 January – José Pereira, 84, Indian-origin American Sanskrit scholar, theologian and artist from Goa (born 1931).
- 28 January
  - Mala Aravindan, 76, Malayalam theatre and film actor (born 1939)
  - Jaswant Singh Rajput, 88, field hockey player, part of Olympic gold medal-winning team in 1948 and 1952 (born 1926).
  - Dhruv Ganesh, He was just 29 when he died. The young actor had faced a tragic death due to Tuberculosis that put an end to his film journey.
- January – Subhash Ghisingh, 78, founder of the Gorkha National Liberation Front in the Gorkhaland movement (born 1936)

=== February ===
- 2 February – Anand Shukla, 74, cricketer (born 1941).
- 7 February – Vasu Malali, 48, Kannada author and film director (born 1967).
- 13 February – Kesava Reddy, 68, Telugu novelist (born 1946).
- 16 February
  - R. R. Patil, 57, politician, Deputy Chief Minister of Maharashtra (2004–2008), (born 1957)
  - Rajinder Puri, 80, cartoonist and political activist (born 1934).
- 18 February – D. Ramanaidu, 78, Telugu film producer and politician (born 1936)
- 19 February – Nirad Mohapatra, 67, Oriya film director known for his film Maya Miriga, (born 1947)
- 20 February – Govind Pansare, 81, political activist and author (born 1933)
- 23 February – R. C. Sakthi, 76, Tamil film director and actor (born 1940).
- 24 February – Mayandi Bharathi, 98, Indian independence activist (born 1917).
- 25 February – A. Vincent, 86, cinematographer (Prem Nagar) and director (Bhargavi Nilayam) (born 1928).
- 26 February
  - Meera Kosambi, 75, sociologist (born 1936).
  - Hukam Singh, 89, politician, Chief Minister of Haryana (1990–1991), (born 1926).

=== March ===
- 1 March – Atul Tandon, 67, academic, former Director of MICA (born 1948).
- 2 March – Lavkumar Khachar, 84, ornithologist (born 1931).
- 3 March – Laxminarayana Mudiraj, 86, politician, Mayor of Hyderabad (1969–1970).
- 4 March – Ninan Koshy, 81, foreign affairs expert, political thinker and theologian (born 1934).
- 6 March –
  - Ram Sundar Das, 94, politician, Chief Minister of Bihar (1979–1980), (born 1921).
  - Kishore Te, 36, film editor, his work Aadukalam won the 2010 National Film Award for Best Editing, (born 1973).
  - Pheiroijam Parijat Singh, 72, politician (born 1943).
- 7 March – G. Karthikeyan, 66, politician, speaker of the Kerala Legislative Assembly (born 1949).
- 8 March – Vinod Mehta, 73, editor of The Pioneer and Outlook magazine, (born 1941).
- 10 March – Meena Shah, 78, badminton player, Arjuna Award recipient (born 1936).
- 12 March – Siddalingaiah, 79, Kannada film director, known for his works Bangaarada Manushya and Bhootayyana Maga Ayyu, (born 1936).
- 13 March – Suzette Jordan, 40, anti-rape campaigner (born 1974).
- 15 March –
  - Narayan Desai, 90, Gandhian, anti-nuclear activist and Gujarati writer, recipient of Sahitya Akademi Award (born 1924).
  - Krishna Kalle, 74, Marathi playback singer. (born 1940)
  - Kavitha Prasad Rallabandi, 53, Telugu poet and civil servant.
- 16 March – D. K. Ravi, 35, IAS officer. (born 1979)
- 17 March – Ameerjan, 70, film director. (born 1942)
- 18 March – Ramesh Chandra Bhanja, 76, writer of Oriya children's literature.
- 20 March – Shahir Krishnarao Sable, 92, Marathi folk singer-songwriter. (born 1923)
- 21 March – Yusufali Kechery, 81, Malayalam poet and film producer. (born 1934)
- 26 March – Paty Ripple Kyndiah, 86, politician from Meghalaya. (born 1928)
- 28 March – T. Sailo, 93, former Chief Minister of Mizoram (born 1922)

=== April ===
- 1 April – Kailash Vajpeyi, 79, Hindi poet, Sahitya Akademi Award recipient (born 1923).
- 4 April – Malli Mastan Babu, 40, mountaineer (born 1974).
- 7 April – Kalmanje Jagannatha Shetty, 78, former Supreme Court judge (born 1927).
- 8 April –
  - Abraham Eraly, 80, historian and magazine editor (born 1934).
  - Nagore E. M. Hanifa, 89, politician and Tamil playback singer.
  - Jayakanthan, 80, Tamil novelist, recipient of Jnanpith and Sahitya Akademi Award (born 1934).
- 9 April –
  - Hrushikesh Moolgavkar, 94, former Air Chief Marshal and Chief of Air Staff (1976–1978), (born 1920).
  - Narra Raghava Reddy, 92, politician (born 1924).
- 10 April – Ghulam Rasool Kar, 94, politician (born 1921).
- 11 April – Hanut Singh Rathore, 82, Lieutenant general in Indian Army, played a key role in the Indo-Pakistani War of 1971, recipient of Maha Vir Chakra (born 1933).
- 14 April – Vilas Sarang, 73, author (born 1942).
- 15 April – Bidyut Chakraborty, 56, Assamese film director.
- 21 April – Janaki Ballabh Patnaik, 89, former Governor of Assam and former Chief Minister of Odisha (born 1927)
- 23 April – E. M. Subramaniam, 67, Carnatic percussionist, noted Ghatam player (born 1948).
- 24 April – Ismail Hussain, 65, politician, MP for Barpeta (2009–2014) (born 1950).
- 26 April – Masudur Rahman Baidya, 46, double-amputee swimmer who crossed the English Channel and the Strait of Gibraltar (born 1968).
- 29 April – Gopulu, 90, cartoonist for Ananda Vikatan magazine. (born 1924)
- 30 April – Milap Chand Jain, 86, former Delhi High Court judge and Lokayukta of Rajasthan. (born 1929)

=== May ===
- 1 May – Amitabha Chowdhury, 87, journalist. (born 1927)
- 3 May – Baleshwar Ram, 87, former Lok Sabha member from Rosera.
- 7 May – Amalendu Guha, 92, historian (born 1924)
- 10 May – Ninad Bedekar, 65, historian and author.
- 12 May – Suchitra Bhattacharya, 65, Bengali language author, recipient of Katha Award. (born 1950)
- 16 May – Shikha Joshi, 40, actress and model.
- 18 May – Aruna Shanbaug, 67, she was in a vegetative state since 1973 after a brutal rape, she was one of the focuses of the euthanasia debate in India. (born 1948)
- 20 May – Sudha Shivpuri, 77, TV actress (born 1937) (born 1937)

=== June ===
- 2 June – Bijoya Ray, 98, Bengali language actress. (born 1917)
- 6 June – Aarthi Agarwal, 31, actress in Telugu films (born 1984)
- 8 June – Dasaradhi Rangacharya, 86, Telugu author and Sahitya Akademi recipient. (born 1928)
- 9 June – Hemant Kanitkar, 72, cricketer. (born 1942)
- 12 June – Nek Chand Saini, 90, artist and creator of the Rock Garden of Chandigarh. (born 1924)
- 13 June – Sheila Kaul, 100, politician, Governor of Himachal Pradesh (1995–1996). (born 1915)
- 16 June – Charles Correa, 84, architect and urban planner, recipient of Padma Shri award. (born 1930)
- 19 June –
  - Jagjit Singh Anand, 93, political activist and newspaper editor for Nawan Zamana. (born 1921)
  - Tukoji Rao Pawar, 51, royalty and politician, Maharaja of Dewas Senior. (born 1963)
- 23 June –
  - Sanjeet Bedi, actor known for his role in Sanjivani.
  - Praful Bidwai, 66, journalist and columnist. (born 1949)
  - Nirmala Joshi, 81, Roman Catholic nun, Superior General of the Missionaries of Charity (1997–2009). (born 1934)
  - Alex Mathew, 57, Malayalam actor, known for his role in Thoovanathumbikal (born 1959)
  - Ajit Singh, 74, economist of Indian origin. (born 1940)
- 24 June – Dileep Singh Bhuria, 71, politician and Lok Sabha member from Ratlam-Jhabua. (born 1944)
- 25 June – Vithal Rao, 85, ghazal singer. (born 1929)
- 26 June – Shiv Singh, 76, sculptor. (born 1938)
- 30 June – K. P. P. Nambiar, 86, industrialist. (born 1929)

=== July ===
- 3 July –
  - Yogesh Kumar Sabharwal, 73, Chief Justice of India (2005–2007). (born 1942)
  - Charanjit Singh, 75, musician known for his acid house compositions. (born 1940)
- 6 July –
  - Ramanathan Gnanadesikan, 82, statistician. (born 1932)
  - Bhattam Srirama Murthy, 89, politician. (born 1926)
- 9 July –
  - Bashar Nawaz, 79, Urdu poet and songwriter. (born 1935)
  - Sriballav Panigrahi, 74, politician, member of the Lok Sabha (1984–1989, 1991–1998) from Deogarh. (born 1940)
- 11 July – P. Chendur Pandian, 65, politician, Tamil Nadu MLA for Kadayanallur (since 2011). (born 1949/1950)
- 14 July – M. S. Viswanathan, 81, music composer. (born 1928)
- 14 July – Sheila Ramani, 83, actress. (born 1932)
- 16 July –
  - V. Ramakrishna, 68, Telugu playback singer. (born 1947)
  - Moreshwar Save, 85, politician, MP for Aurangabad (1989–1996). (born 1931)
- 18 July – Sushil Bhattacharya, 90, football player, men's (East Bengal) and women's (national team) coach. (born 1924)
- 21 July – T. Kanakam, 88, actress. (born 1927)
- 25 July –
  - Kalpataru Das, 67, politician, member of the Rajya Sabha (since 2014), Odisha MLA for Dharmasala (1995–2014) (born 1948)
  - R. S. Gavai, 86, politician, Governor of Bihar (2006–2008), Kerala (2008–2011), member of the Rajya Sabha (2000–2006), MP for Amravati (1998). (born 1929)
- 26 July – Bijoy Krishna Handique, 80, politician, MP for Jorhat (1991–2014), Rajya Sabha (1980–1986), Assam MLA for Jorhat (1971–1980). (born 1934)
- 27 July – Dr A. P. J. Abdul Kalam, 83, President (2002–2007) and aerospace scientist. (born 1931)
- 28 July – Suniti Solomon, 76, physician and HIV researcher. (born 1938)
- 30 July – Yakub Memon, 53, chartered accountant, convicted of financing the 1993 Bombay bombings, execution by hanging. (born 1962)
- 31 July – Sasi Perumal, 59, Gandhian and anti-alcohol activist. (born 1955)

=== August ===
- 9 August – Kayyar Kinhanna Rai, 101, freedom fighter and author. (born 1915)
- 10 August – Sunil Das, 76, postmodern artist. (born 1939)
- 13 August – Om Prakash Munjal, 87, industrialist, founder of Hero Cycles. (born 1928)
- 14 August – Lavanam, 86, social reformer. (born 1930)
- 18 August – Suvra Mukherjee, 74, wife of President Pranab Mukherjee (born 1940)
- 19 August –
  - Sanat Mehta, 90, politician. (born 1925)
  - Chitranjan Swaroop, 70, politician from Muzaffarnagar. (born 1946)
- 24 August – Venkatesh Nayak, 79, politician, member of the Legislative Assembly for Karnataka (since 2013), train derailment. (born 1936)
- 30 August – M. M. Kalburgi, 76, writer and academic. (born 1938)

=== September ===
- 3 September – Binny Yanga, 57, social worker and activist. (born 1958)
- 4 September – Wilfred de Souza, 88, politician, Chief Minister of Goa (1993–1994, 1998). (born 1927)
- 5 September – Aadesh Shrivastava, 51, composer and singer. (born 1964)
- 7 September – Sowkoor Jayaprakash Shetty, 80, Karnataka politician. (born 1935)
- 9 September
  - Mitrasen Yadav, 81, Uttar Pradesh politician. (born 1934)
  - Ramaswamy R. Iyer, 86, government adviser on water policy.
- 11 September – Jaswant Singh Neki, 90, academic and poet. (born 1925)
- 13 September – Kalamandalam Satyabhama, 77, Mohiniyattam dancer. (born 1937)
- 17 September – Bal Pandit, 86, cricket player and commentator. (born 1929)
- 20 September
  - Jagmohan Dalmiya, 75, cricket administrator, businessman, President of the Board of Control for Cricket in India, (b. 1940) (born 1940)
  - Radhika Thilak, 45, playback singer in Malayalam films. (born 1969)
- 23 September – Dayananda Saraswati, 85, Hindu monk and teacher (Arsha Vidya Gurukulam). (born 1930)
- 24 September – Mohan Bhandari, actor (born 1930)
- 27 September
  - Syed Ahmed, 73, politician, Governor of Jharkhand (2011–2015) and Manipur (2015). (born 1945)
  - Kallen Pokkudan, 78, environmental activist and writer. (born 1937)
- 28 September – Ram Kapse, 81, politician, Lieutenant Governor of Andaman and Nicobar Islands (2004–2006). (born 1933)

=== October ===
- 2 October – Mohan Singh, 68, common but great man (born 1945)
- 3 October – Raghavan Narasimhan, 78, mathematician. (born 1937)
- 4 October – Edida Nageswara Rao, 81, film producer, known for Sankarabharanam. (born 1934)
- 7 October – Pushpa Bhuyan, 69, Sattriya dancer. (born 1946)
- 9 October –
  - Ravindra Jain, 71, film score composer. (born 1944)
  - N. Ramani, 81, flautist. (born 1934)
- 10 October – Manorama, 78, Tamil actress. (born 1937)
- 14 October – Radhakrishna Hariram Tahiliani, 85, Chief of the Naval Staff (1984–1987). (born 1930)
- 19 October – Kallu Chidambaram, 67, Telugu comic actor. (born 1948)
- 20 October –
  - Syed Zahoor Qasim, 92, marine biologist, who led India's first Antarctica mission. (born 1926)
  - K. S. L. Swamy, 77, Kannada actor and director. (born 1939)
- 22 October – Labh Janjua, 57, singer-songwriter.
- 23 October – Shamshad Hussain, 69, painter. (born 1946)
- 24 October – Bhaskar Save, 93, organic farmer and activist. (born 1922)
- 25 October – Pijush Ganguly, 50, Bengali actor, known for his role in Mahulbanir Sereng. (born 1965)
- 27 October –
  - Ranjit Roy Chaudhury, 84, pharmacologist, recipient of Padma Shri award. (born 1930)
  - Gulam Noon, Baron Noon, 79, Indian-origin British food production businessman, chancellor of University of East London. (born 1936)
  - Rajendra Singh Rana, 54, politician, Uttar Pradesh MLA for Deoband (2002–2007, 2012–2015). (born 1961)

=== November ===
- 1 November – Brijmohan Lall Munjal, 92, transportation manufacturing executive, co-founder of Hero Cycles and Hero MotoCorp. (born 1923)
- 2 November –
  - Hashim Abdul Halim, 80, politician, West Bengal MLA for Amdanga (1977–2006) and Entally (2006–2011), heart attack. (born 1935)
  - Kondavalasa Lakshmana Rao, 69, actor, brain infection. (born 1946)
- 7 November – Bappaditya Bandopadhyay, 45, film director and poet, heart attack. (born 1970)
- 8 November – Om Prakash Mehra, 96, military officer, Chief of Air Staff (1973–1976), Governor of Maharashtra (1980–1982) and Rajasthan (1985–1987). (born 1919)
- 14 November –
  - Hemanga Baruah, 49, cricketer (Assam). (born 1966)
  - Avinash K. Dorle, Indian scientist and science professor (born 1935)
  - K. S. Gopalakrishnan, 86, film director, screenwriter and producer. (born 1929)
- 15 November – Saeed Jaffrey, 86, India-born British actor. (born 1929)
- 17 November –
  - Pithukuli Murugadas, 95, devotional singer. (born 1920)
  - Ashok Singhal, 89, Hindu activist. (born 1926)
- 19 November – R. K. Trivedi, 94, politician, Governor of Gujarat (1986–1990). (born 1921)
- 24 November – A. S. Ponnammal, 82, politician, cancer. (born 1927)
- 26 November – H. Khekiho Zhimomi, 69, politician, heart ailment. (born 1946)
- 30 November –
  - Sabri Khan, 88, sarangi player. (born 1927)
  - Brajraj Mahapatra, 94, Raja of Tigiria State (1943–1947). (born 1921)

=== December ===
- 2 December –
  - M. A. M. Ramaswamy, 84, industrialist and politician. (born 1931)
  - A. Sheriff, 74, screenwriter (Avalude Ravukal). (born 1940)
- 8 December – Ramashankar Yadav, 58, Hindi poet and activist. (born 1957)
- 11 December – Hema Upadhyay, 43, artist, bludgeoned. (born 2015)
- 12 December –
  - Sharad Anantrao Joshi, 80, politician and social activist. (born 1935)
  - Chaudhary Yashpal Singh, 94, politician (born 1921)
- 19 December – Ranganath, 66, Telugu actor. (born 1949)
- 22 December – V. S. Malimath, 86, judge, former Chief Justice of Karnataka (1984) and Kerala (1985–1991). (born 1929)
- 24 December – Suprovat Chakravarty, 86, Olympic cyclist (1952), heart attack.
- 25 December – Sadhana Shivdasani, 74, film actress (Love in Simla, Woh Kaun Thi, Hum Dono). (born 1941)
- 29 December –
  - Om Prakash Malhotra, 93, army general. (born 1922)
  - Yuhanon Mor Philexinos, 74, Syriac Orthodox Church Bishop of Malabar. (born 1941)
- 30 December – Mangesh Padgaonkar, 86, Marathi poet. (born 1929)

== Transport ==
=== Events ===
- 9 January – Vistara, a Tata Sons-Singapore Airlines joint-venture airline made its first flight.
- 13 January – Indian Railways introduced a train that can run both on diesel and CNG.
- 26 February – Railway Minister Suresh Prabhu presented the Railway Budget in the Parliament.
- 14 March – Work on the Ahmedabad Metro began.
- 19 March – Ratan Tata appointed head of the Kaya Kalp council of the Indian Railways. The council's aim is to introduce innovations and reforms in the public firm.
- 24 March – Indian Railways launched a prepaid RuPay debit card for booking tickets.
- 12 April – Low-cost airline Air Pegasus made first flight.
- 22 April – Indian Railways launched "utsonmobile" mobile app which would allow people to buy unreserved tickets.
- 22 June – First commercial bus service from Kolkata to Agartala via Dhaka flagged off from Karunamoyee International Bus Stand, Kolkata.
- 29 June – Chennai Metro commenced operations.
- 18 August – Cochin International Airport became fully-solar powered. The 12 MW solar power plant was inaugurated by Chief Minister Oommen Chandy.
- 1 September – Railway Minister Suresh Prabhu flagged off first train after gauge conversion on Sikar Loharu route.

=== Accidents ===
==== Railways ====
- 13 February – Bengaluru-Ernakulam Intercity Express derailed near Bengaluru, killing 9 persons and injuring about 100.
- 20 March – 36 dead and 150 injured after Dehradun-Varanasi Janata Express missed its stop at Bachhrawan station and collided with a heap of sand.
- 3 May – Mumbai-Ernakulam Duronto Express derailed near Balli in Goa. No injuries were reported.
- 8 May – 23 wagons of a coal-carrying freight train derailed in Rohtas district in Bihar. No injuries were reported.
- 25 May – Rourkela-Jammu Muri Express derailed near Sirathu, Uttar Pradesh, killing 2.
- 4 August – Harda twin train derailment: Kamayani Express and Janata Express derailed at a bridge near Harda, Madhya Pradesh, due to floods in the Machak river. The accident killed at least 28 passengers.
- 12 September
  - Secunderabad-Mumbai Duronto Express derailed near Gulbarga killing at least 2.
  - A Kalka–Shimla Railway narrow gauge train derailed killing two British tourists.
- 24 August – 5 persons died after a train collided with the Bangalore-Nanded Express train. A. A. Venkatesh Naik, a member of Karnataka legislative assembly, was among the dead.
- 4 September – Chennai-Mangalore mail derailed near Virudhachalam in Tamil Nadu injuring more than 40.

==== Road ====
- 16 February – A bus carrying at least 60 passengers plunged into a gorge in Dhar district, Madhya Pradesh resulting in at least ten deaths and 33 people being injured.
- 12 June – 15 people died and 48 were injured when a bus overturned and collided with a tree on the Chandigarh-Phagwara highway.
- 13 June
  - 5 people died and about a 100 were injured in Ludhiana, when a tanker truck carrying ammonia leaked. The truck got stuck under a low-clearance bridge and damaged its valve.
  - 21 people died when a van fell from the Dowleswaram Barrage into the Godavari River. The vehicle was returning from Tirupati to Achutapuram.
- 18 August – 15 people were killed when a mini van collided with a bus in Cherlopalem, Prakasam district, Andhra Pradesh.
- Date Unknown* A bus going to Jodhpur overturned, killing 2.

==== Waterways ====
- 26 August – A fishing boat collided with a ferry at Fort Kochi, Kerala, killing 6 and injuring 21.

== Sports ==
- 31 January – 35th National Games began in Kerala.

=== Badminton ===
- 15 March – Srikanth Kidambi won the Swiss Open (badminton) men's singles title by defeating Viktor Axelsen.
- 28 March – Saina Nehwal reached world's rank No. 1 in women's badminton, after Carolina Marin lost to Ratchanok Intanon. Nehwal defeated Yui Hashimoto in the semi-final of India Open.
- 29 March
  - Saina Nehwal won the India Open title by defeating Ratchanok Intanon.
  - Srikanth Kidambi won the India Open men's singles title by defeating Viktor Axelsen.
- 10 May – Rohan Bopanna and Florin Mergea won the men's double title at the 2015 Madrid Open.
- 28 June – Jwala Gutta and Ashwini Ponnappa won the women's double title at the 2015 Canada Open badminton tournament.
- 20 September – Ajay Jayaram won a silver at the Korea Open.
- 11 October – Ajay Jayaram successfully defended his Dutch Open title.

=== Cricket ===
- 7 April – The opening ceremony of the 2015 Indian Premier League took place in Kolkata.
- 25 May – Mumbai Indians won the 2015 Indian Premier League by defeating Chennai Super Kings in the final at Eden Gardens.
- 14 July – A panel appointed by the Supreme Court found Chennai Super Kings and Rajasthan Royals guilty of spot-fixing and suspended them from the Indian Premier League for two years.
- 15 October – Zaheer Khan announced retirement from international cricket.
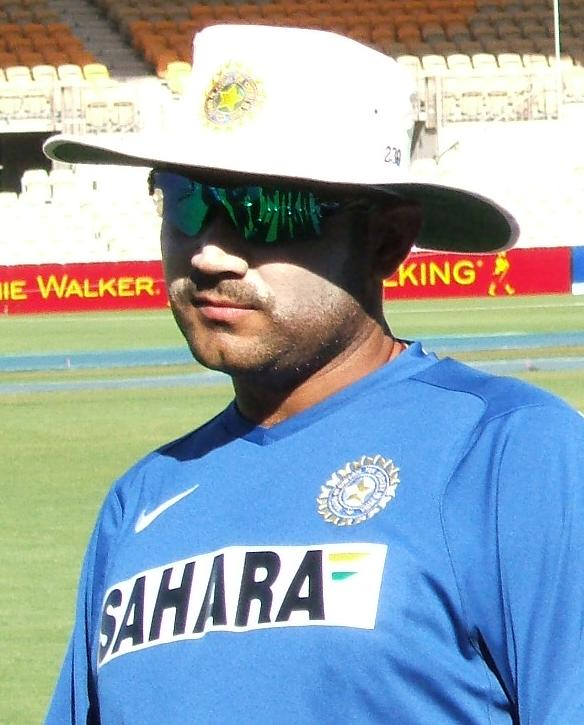
- Virender Sehwag announced his retirement.
  20 October – Virender Sehwag announced retirement from international cricket.

==== ICC Cricket World Cup 2015 ====
- 14 February – India defeated Pakistan by 76 runs at the Adelaide Oval in a Pool B match.
- 22 February – India defeated South Africa by 130 runs at the Melbourne Cricket Ground in a Pool B match.
- 28 February – India defeated United Arab Emirates by 9 wickets at the WACA Ground in a Pool B match.
- 6 March – India defeated West Indies by 4 wickets at the WACA Ground in a Pool B match to reach quarterfinals.
- 14 March – India defeated Zimbabwe by 6 wickets at the WACA Ground in a Pool B match.
- 19 March – India defeated Bangladesh by 109 runs at the Melbourne Cricket Ground in the quarterfinal to reach the semi-final.
- 26 March – India was defeated by Australia by 95 runs at the Sydney Cricket Ground in the semi-final.

=== Tennis ===
- 16 January – Sania Mirza and Bethanie Mattek-Sands won the women's doubles title at the Sydney International.
- 1 February – Martina Hingis and Leander Paes won the mixed doubles title at the Australian Open.
- 22 March – Sania Mirza and Martina Hingis won the 2015 BNP Paribas Open women's doubles title.
- 5 April – Sania Mirza and Martina Hingis won the women's doubles title at the 2015 Miami Open.
- 13 April –
  - Sania Mirza reached rank one in women's double.
  - Sania Mirza and Martina Hingis won the 2015 Family Circle Cup women's doubles title.
- 15 April – Sachin Tendulkar was inducted into the Laureus Sports Academy.
- 11 July – Sania Mirza and Martina Hingis won the women's double title at the 2015 Wimbledon Championships.
- 12 July
  - Sumit Nagal and Lý Hoàng Nam won the boy's double title at the 2015 Wimbledon Championships.
  - Leander Paes and Martina Hingis won the mixed doubles title at the 2015 Wimbledon Championships.
- 26 September – Sania Mirza and Martina Hingis won the women's double title at the Guangzhou International Women's Open.
- 3 October – Sania Mirza and Martina Hingis won the 2015 Wuhan Open women's doubles title.
- 10 October – Sania Mirza and Martina Hingis won the women's double title at the 2015 China Open.

=== Hockey ===
- 22 February – Ranchi Rays won the Hockey India League by defeating Punjab Warriors.
- 12 April – India won the bronze at Sultan Azlan Shah Cup.
- 11 October – Punjab National Bank won the Beighton Cup.

=== Golf ===
- 8 February – Anirban Lahiri won the Malaysian Open (golf) title.
- 22 February – Anirban Lahiri won the Hero Indian Open golf title.

=== Other ===
- 14 January – Open water swimmer Bhakti Sharma established a record by swimming 1.4 miles in 52 minutes in 1 °C waters in the Antarctic Ocean.
- 24 April – Motor sports were given government recognition by including the Federation of Motor Sports Clubs of India in the list of National Sports Federations (NSFs).
- 26 June – Satnam Singh Bhamara was signed by Dallas Mavericks, making him the first Indian to be signed by an NBA team.
- 29 June – Abhijeet Gupta won the Commonwealth Chess Championship by winning 7 out of 9 games and drawing 2 against Arghyadip Das.
- 5 July – India defeated Sri Lanka to retain the South Asian Basketball Association Championship title.
- 14 July – Dipa Karmakar won a bronze medal at the ART Asian Gymnastics Championships.
- 2 August – Joshna Chinappa won the 2015 Women's Victorian Open squash tournament by defeating Line Hansen.
- 13 August – Pankaj Advani won the Six-red World Championship after defeating Ng on Yee of Hong Kong.
- 5 September – Vikas Krishan Yadav won a silver at the 2015 Asian Amateur Boxing Championships.
- 24 September – Abhishek Verma won a silver at the 2015 Archery World Cup in the compound event.
- 13 September – Narsingh Pancham Yadav won a bronze at the 2015 World Wrestling Championships, qualifying for the Rio Olympics.
- 25 September – Deepika Kumari won a silver at the 2015 Archery World Cup in the recurve event.
- 26 September – 10 October – World Bridge Team Championships was held in Chennai.
- 27 September – Pankaj Advani won the 2015 IBSF World Billiards Championship by defeating Peter Gilchrist in a timed match.
- 30 September – At the 2015 Asian Air Gun Championship, Heena Sidhu won gold in the women's 10m air pistol event. Shweta Singh won silver in the marquee event. Heena, Shweta and Yashaswini Singh Deshwal won the team women's 10m air pistol team event.
- 31 October – Michael Kueffer finished first in the Paragliding World Cup held in Bir, Himachal Pradesh.
- 20 December – Indian men win 3rd Roll Ball World Cup Championship by beating Iran.
