= Subsidies in India =

The Indian government has, since war, subsidised many industries and products, from fuel to gas.

Kerosene subsidy was introduced during the 2nd Five Year Plan (1956–1961) and since 2009 slowly decreased until 2022 when it was eliminated.

== Introduction ==
A subsidy, often viewed as the converse of a tax, is an instrument of fiscal policy. Derived from the Latin word 'subsidium', a subsidy literally implies coming to assistance from behind. However, their beneficial potential is at its best when they are transparent, well targeted, and suitably designed for practical implementation. Subsidies are helpful for both economy and people as well. Subsidies have a long-term impact on the economy; the Green Revolution being one example. Farmers were given good quality grain for subsidised prices. Likewise, we can see that how the government of India is trying to reduce air pollution to subsidies lpg

Like indirect taxes, they can alter relative prices and budget constraints and thereby affect decisions concerning production, consumption and allocation of resources. Subsidies in areas such as education, health and environment at times merit justification on grounds that their benefits are spread well beyond the immediate recipients, and are shared by the population at large, present and future. For many other subsidies, however the case is not so clear-cut. Arising due to extensive governmental participation in a variety of economic activities, there are many subsidies that shelter inefficiencies or are of doubtful distributional credentials. Subsidies that are ineffective or distortionary need to be weaned out, for an undiscerning, uncontrolled and opaque growth of subsidies can be deleterious for a country's public finances.

In India, as also elsewhere, subsidies now account for a significant part of government's expenditures although, like that of an iceberg, only their tip may be visible. These implicit subsidies not only cause a considerable draft on the already strained fiscal resources, but may also fail on the anvil of equity and efficiency as has already been pointed out above.

In the context of their economic effects, subsidies have been subjected to an intense debate in India in recent years. Issues like the distortionary effects of agricultural subsidies on the cropping pattern, their impact on inter-regional disparities in development, the sub-optimal use of scarce inputs like water and power induced by subsidies, and whether subsidies lead to systemic inefficiencies have been examined at length. Inadequate targeting of subsidies has especially been picked up for discussion.

This paper based on the study conducted by Srivastava, Sen et al. under the aegis of National Institute of Public Finance and Policy, and the discussion paper brought out by Department of Economic Affairs( Ministry of Finance) in 1997, aims to provide a comprehensive estimate of budget-based subsidies in India. In addition, recent trends have been included from the Economic Survey for the year 2004–05. Attention is focused on bringing out the magnitude of the implicit subsidies, in addition to the explicit ones, to form an idea as to how heavy a draft do they constitute on the fiscal resources of the economy.

== Social security subsidies ==
The following table shows financial size of the social security subsidies in India funded by the Union government of India. The table does not cover other programs operated by various State governments, see Public welfare in India. The social security benefits / subsidies offered by various state governments is estimated to be above Rs. 600 billion (US$10 billion). Thus total subsidies become Rs. 3,600 billion (US$60 billion).

Social security budget 2013–14
| Region | Social security program | Billion Rupee | Billion US$ |
|---|---|---|---|
| Pan India | Total subsidy for FY-2013-14 (approx) | 3,600 | 60.00 |
| Pan India | Food Security (PDS) (subsidy) | 1,250 | 20.83 |
| Pan India | Petroleum (subsidy) | 970 | 16.17 |
| Rural | Fertilizer (subsidy) | 660 | 11.00 |
| Rural | NREGA (non-subsidy) | 330 | 5.50 |
| Rural | Child development (ICDS) (non-subsidy) | 177 | 2.95 |
| Rural | Drinking water and sanitation (non-subsidy) | 152 | 2.53 |
| Rural | Indira Awaas Yojana (IAY) (non-subsidy) | 151 | 2.52 |
| Rural | Maternal and child malnutrition (non-subsidy) | 3 | 0.05 |
| States | Various programmes of state govts (subsidy/non-subsidy) | 600 | 10.00 |

== Subsidy: Meaning and economic rationale ==
=== Objectives ===
Subsidies, by means of creating a wedge between consumer prices and producer costs, lead to changes in demand/ supply decisions. Subsidies are often aimed at :

1. inducing higher consumption/ production
2. offsetting market imperfections including internalisation of externalities;
3. achievement of social policy objectives including redistribution of income, population control, etc.

=== Transfers and Subsidies ===
Transfers which are straight income supplements need to be distinguished from subsidies. An unconditional transfer to an individual would augment his income and would be distributed over the entire range of his expenditures. A subsidy however refers to a specific good, the relative price of which has been lowered because of the subsidy with a view to changing the consumption/ allocation decisions in favour of the subsidised goods. Even when subsidy is hundred percent, i.e. the good is supplied free of cost, it should be distinguished from an income-transfer (of an equivalent amount) which need not be spent exclusively on the subsidised good.

Transfers may be preferred to subsidies on the ground that i) any given expenditure of State funds will increase welfare more if it is given as an income-transfer rather than via subsidising the price of some commodities, and ii) transfer payments can be better targeted at a specific income groups as compared to free or subsidised goods.

=== Mode of administering a subsidy ===
The various alternative modes of administering a subsidy are:

1. Subsidy to producers
2. Subsidy to consumers
3. Subsidy to producers of inputs
4. Providing Incentives Instead of Subsidising
5. Production/sales through public enterprises
6. Cross subsidisation

=== Subsidy targeting ===
Subsidies can be distributed among individuals according to a set of selected criteria, e.g. 1) merit, 2) income-level, 3)social group etc. two types of errors arise if proper targeting is not done, i.e. exclusion errors and inclusion errors. In the former case, some of those who deserve to receive a subsidy are excluded, and in the latter case, some of those who do not deserve to receive subsidy get included in the subsidy programme.

=== Effects of subsidies ===
Economic effects of subsidies can be broadly grouped into

1. Allocative effects: these relate to the sectoral allocation of resources. Subsidies help draw more resources towards the subsidised sector
2. Redistributive effects: these generally depend upon the elasticities of demands of the relevant groups for the subsidised good as well as the elasticity of supply of the same good and the mode of administering the subsidy.
3. Fiscal effects: subsidies have obvious fiscal effects since a large part of subsidies emanate from the budget. They directly increase fiscal deficits. Subsidies may also indirectly affect the budget adversely by drawing resources away from tax-yielding sectors towards sectors that may have a low tax-revenue potential.
4. Trade effects: a regulated price, which is substantially lower than the market clearing price, may reduce domestic supply and lead to an increase in imports. On the other hand, subsidies to domestic producers may enable them to offer internationally competitive prices, reducing imports or raising exports.

Subsidies may also lead to perverse or unintended economic effects. They would result in inefficient resource allocation if imposed on a competitive market or where market imperfections do not justify a subsidy, by diverting economic resources away from areas where their marginal productivity would be higher. Generalised subsidies waste resources; further, they may have perverse distributional effects endowing greater benefits on the better off people. For example, a price control may lead to lower production and shortages and thus generate black markets resulting in profits to operators in such markets and economic rents to privileged people who have access to the distribution of the good concerned at the controlled price.

Subsidies have a tendency to self-perpetuate. They create vested interests and acquire political hues. In addition, it is difficult to control the incidence of a subsidy since their effects are transmitted through the mechanism of the market, which often has imperfections other than those addressed by the subsidy. On 29 June 2012, C Rangarajan, Chairman of the Prime Minister's Advisory Council in view of present difficult economic position, advocated cutting down of fuel and fertiliser subsidies to keep the fiscal deficit within the budgeted level of 5.1 per cent.

== Subsidy issues in India ==
Subsidies have increased in India for several reasons. In particular this proliferation can be traced to 1)the expanse of governmental activities 2) relatively weak determination of governments to recover costs from the respective users of the subsidies, even when this may be desirable on economic grounds, and 3) generally low efficiency levels of governmental activities.

In the context of their economic effects, subsidies have been subjected to an intense debate in India in recent years. Some of the major issues that have emerged in the literature are indicated below:

- Whether the magnitude and incidence of subsidies, explicit and implicit, have spun out of control; their burden on government finances being unbearable, and their cost being felt in terms of a decline of real public investment in agriculture.
- Whether agricultural subsidies distort the cropping pattern and lead to inter-regional disparities in development
- Whether general subsidies on scarce inputs like water and power have distorted their optimal allocation
- Whether subsidies basically cover only inefficiencies in the provision of governmental services
- Whether subsidies like (food subsidies) have a predominant urban bias
- Whether subsidies are mistargeted
- Whether subsidies have a deleterious effect on general economic growth of sectors not covered by the subsidies
- Whether agricultural subsidies are biased against small and marginal farmers
- How should government services be priced or recovery rates determined
- What is the impact of subsidies on the quality of environment and ecology

=== Sustainability Issues ===
An example of potential environmental or sustainability issues arising from the current subsidy structure can be seen interrelated problems of water and energy consumption in the agricultural sector.

During the Green Revolution in the 1960s and 70s, India's agricultural productivity grew greatly, in part due to a dramatic increase in agricultural irrigation, particularly from groundwater sources.

While that increase in irrigation has helped the nation feed itself, it has also created a groundwater crisis, the dimensions of which have become increasingly clear in recent years. Groundwater tables are falling in many areas of the country, from around 20 cm per year in Punjab to 3 to 5 metres per year in parts of Gujarat. The medium to long-term risks to agriculture in such a scenario range from an eventual decline in water resources, to the intrusion of salt-water in coastal areas.

As groundwater tables drop, the pumping of groundwater from deeper and deeper wells requires an ever-increasing amount of electricity. Because electricity for agriculture is subsidised, there is little incentive for farmers to adopt water-saving techniques, creating a vicious circle of water and energy consumption.

Recently, the government of Gujarat has engaged in a pilot program to experiment with ways to shift incentives for farmers toward more water- and energy-efficient technologies and practices.

In Karnataka, three projects are implemented in BESCOM and HESCOM areas (under AgDSM program = Agricultural Demand Side Management), with an objective to promote use of energy efficient pump sets in the irrigation.

=== Targeting intended recipients ===
According to the United Nations Development Program, the richest 20% of the Indian population received $16 billion in subsidies in 2014. These subsidies were primarily the result of open subsidies on six goods and services – cooking gas, railways, power, aviation fuel, gold and kerosene. Another subsidy that benefits the richer sections of the population is tax exemption on public provident funds. However, these subsidies also benefit middle class and poor sections of the population.

== Methodology for estimation of subsidies in India ==
Alternative approaches and conventions have evolved regarding measurement of the magnitude of subsidies. Two major conventions relate to measurement through (i) budgets, and (ii) National Accounts. The latter estimates comprise explicit subsidies, and certain direct payments to producers in the private or public sectors (including compensation for operating losses for public undertakings) that are treated as subsidies. This, however, does not encompass all the implicit subsidies.

The estimates of budgetary subsidies are computed as the excess of the costs of providing a service over the recoveries from that service. The costs have been taken as the sum of:

1. revenue expenditure on the concerned service
2. annual depreciation on cumulative capital expenditure for the creation of physical assets in the service;
3. Interest-cost (computed at the average rate of interest actually paid by the respective governments) of cumulative capital expenditure, equity investments in public enterprises, and loans given for the service concerned including those to the public enterprises. The recoveries are the current receipts from a service, which are usually in the form of user charges, fees, interest receipts and dividends.

Mathematically, the subsidy (S) in a service is obtained by:

S = RX + (d + i) K + i ( Z + L ) - ( RR + I + D )

Where:
RX = revenue expenditure on the service
L = sum of loans advanced for the service at the beginning of the period
K = sum of capital expenditure on the service excluding equity investment at the beginning of the period.
Z = sum of equity and loans advanced to public enterprises classified within the service category at the beginning of the period.
RR = revenue receipts from the service
I + D = interest, dividend and other revenue receipts from public enterprises falling within the service category.
d = depreciation rate
i = interest rate

Services provided by the govt are grouped under the broad categories of general, social and economic services.

General services consist of i) organs of state ii) fiscal services iii) administrative services iv) defence services, and v) miscellaneous services. These services can be taken as public goods because they satisfy, in general, the criteria of non-rival consumption and non-excludability. The entitlement to these services is common to all citizens. Since they are to be treated as public goods, they are assumed to be financed through taxes.

Important service categories in social services are i) education consisting of general education, technical education, sports and youth services, and art and culture, ii) health and family welfare, iii) water supply, sanitation, housing and urban development, iv) information and broadcasting, v) labour and employment and vi) social welfare and nutrition.

Under the heading of economics services, the following are included i) agriculture and allied activities, ii) rural development, iii) special area programmes, iv) irrigation and flood control, v)energy, vi) industry and minerals, vii) transport, viii) communications, ix) science technology and environment and x)general economic services.

In the estimation of subsidies these governmental services are divided into three groups:

Group1: all general services, secretariat expenses in social and economics services, and expenditure on natural calamities are included in this subgroup. Being public goods, these are financed out of taxation and are therefore not included in the estimation of subsidies.

Group 2: it consists of services with strong externalities associated with them. In the case of these services, it is arguable that even though the exclusion may be possible, these ought to be treated as merit goods or near-public goods. The provision of subsidies is most justified in this case. Near zero recovery rates in these cases only indicate the societal judgement that these may be financed out of tax-revenues.

Merit social services: elementary education, public health, sewerage and sanitation, information and publicity, welfare of SC, ST's and OBC's, labour, social welfare and nutrition etc.

Merit economic services: soil and water conservation, environmental forestry and wildlife, agricultural research and education, flood control and drainage, roads and bridges, space research, oceanographic research, other scientific research, ecology and environment and meteorology.

Group 3: all the remaining services are clubbed under this head. In these cases consumption is rival and exclusion is possible, therefore cost-recovery is possible through user charges. These services are regarded as non-merit services in the estimation of subsidies.

The distinction between merit and non merit services is based on the perceived strong externalities associated with the merit services. However, it does not imply that the subsidisation in their case needs to be hundred percent. In addition, even if small recoveries are advocated for merit services, the issues relating to the costs of their provision, leakages to non-target beneficiaries, and their effectiveness in attaining the objectives for which they are provided, need to be examined. It also does not mean that there are no externalities associated with non-merit services, or that the subsidies associated with them should be eliminated.

== Central government subsidies ==
=== Trends in the subsidies given by Central Government ( Year 1994-95) ===
- The bulk of the Central Govt's subsidies arise on the provision of economic services, which account for 88% of the total subsidies (10% on merit services and 78% on non-merit).
- The recovery rates in the social end economic services are very low (around 10%).
- Subsidies on non-merit goods are more than five times those on merit goods, which reflects on an unduly large and ill-directed subsidy regime.
- The bulk of subsidies on merit goods go for the construction of roads and bridges, followed by elementary education and scientific research.
- Amongst non-merit services, the biggest recipients are industries and agriculture and allied services.
- 78% of subsidies which go for non-merit economic services are amenable to economic pricing. Even if one allows for a part of these subsidies being given in the interest of redistribution or provision of human needs, a substantial part must be due to inefficiency costs of public provision of these services and/or inessential input or output subsidies.
- Subsidies to Central Public Enterprises are estimated separately as the excess of imputed return on the equity held and loans given by the central government to these enterprises, over actual receipts in the form of dividends and interests. Subsidy in this manner is calculated for each enterprise. They are aggregated according to cognate groups.

Each cognate group has some enterprises that receive a subsidy and some surplus units.

=== Explicit subsidies of the Centre ===
The most important explicit subsidies administered through the Central Government budget are food and fertiliser subsidies, and until recently, export subsidies. These subsidies account for about 30% of the total central subsidies in a year and have grown at a rate of approx 10% per annum over the period 1971–72 to 1996–97.

The relative importance of different explicit subsidies has changed over the years. E.g., food subsidies accounted for about 70% of total Central explicit subsidies in 1974–75. Since then, its relative share fell steadily reaching its lowest of 20.15% in 1990–91. Thence onwards, it has risen steadily reaching a figure of 40% in 1995–96.Export subsidies have been on the decline except for the spurt in the late 1980s, whereas the relative share of the food subsidies has been rising although in a cyclical pattern.

As a proportion of GDP, explicit Central govt subsidies were just about 0.305 in 1971–72. they continued to increase steadily reaching a peak of 2.38% in 1989–90. after this during the reform years, the explicit subsidies as a proportion of GDP have continued to decline.

=== Public Policy ===
In the last quarter of the 20th century, Indian governments began procuring condoms on large scale to facilitate national population control schemes by reselling them at subsidised prices.

=== Recent trends ===
Expenditure on major subsidies has increased in nominal terms from Rs. 95.81 billion in 1990–91 to Rs. 40, 4.16 billion in 2002–03. It was budgeted to increase by 20.3 percent to Rs. 48, 6.36 billion in 2003–04. Expenditure on major subsidies as per cent of revenue expenditure after declining from 13.0 per cent in 1990–91 to 8.7 per cent in 1995-96 started rising to reach a level of 9.6 per cent in 1998–99. In 2002–03, expenditure on major subsidises increased to 11.9 per cent from 10.0 per cent in 2001–02. With the dismantling of the administered price mechanism for petroleum products from 1 April 2002, subsidies in respect of LPG and kerosene distributed through the Public Distribution System are now explicitly reflected in the budget. This partially explains the spurt of 35.3 per cent in the expenditure on major subsidies in 2002–03. The spurt in major subsidies in 2002-03 was also because of an increase in food subsidy by Rs. 66.77 billion necessitated by the widespread drought in the country. Some of the major initiatives taken so far to rationalise the budgetary subsidies include targeted approach to food subsidy (BPL families) under Public Distribution System, allowing Food Corporation of India (FCI) to access market loans carrying lower interest rates, encouraging private trade in food grains, liquidating excess food grain stocks, replacing unit based retention price scheme with a group based scheme in the case of fertiliser subsidies and proposed phasing out of subsidies on PDS kerosene and LPG. (Economic Survey for the year 2004–05

== Subsidies of state governments ==
Subsidies given by 15 non-special category States were estimated for 1993–94, the latest year for which reasonably detailed data were available for all these States. The trends thrown up by the study are:

- Subsidies in social services and economic services both constitute half each of the total subsidies given by the States.
- The proportion of merit subsidies is much higher in social services vis-à-vis economic services.
- The overall recovery rate is 5.81% of the total cost (less than 2% in social services and approx. 9% in economic services).
- There is a distinct tendency for the per capita subsidies to rise as the per capita incomes rise.
- None of the 15 States spends more than 30-35% of total subsidies on merit goods.
- The recovery rates for merit services show variation in a narrow band whereas the largest variations are recorded for recovery rates for non-merit economic services.
- The near zero surpluses for all services show that subsidies are mainly financed by tax-revenues and borrowing in the States.
- More than one-fifth of non-merit social subsidies accrue to education, sports and art & culture.
- In economic services, irrigation accounts for nearly a quarter of services whereas power accounts for around 12%.
- Lastly, subsidies to States' public enterprises are large but recovery in the form of interests and dividends is extremely low.

== Centre and states: aggregate budget-based subsidies ==
Total non-merit subsidy for the Central and State governments taken together amount to Rs. 1021452.4 million in 1994–95, which is 10.71% of GDP at market prices. The share of Central government in this is 35.37%, i.e. roughly half of corresponding State government subsidies. The recovery-rate for the centre, in the case of non-merit subsidies, is 12.13%, which is somewhat higher than the corresponding figure of 9.28% for the States. The difference in recovery rates is striking for non-merit social services, being 18.14% for the centre and 3.97% for the States. It is only marginally different for non-merit economic services (11.65% for Centre and 12.87% for States) where, in fact, States do better.

The total non-merit subsidies for the year 1994-95 amounted to 10.71% of GDP at market prices, resulting in a combined fiscal deficit of 7.3% for the centre, States and Union Territories. Therefore, if these subsidies were phased out, the same would have a discernible impact on the fiscal deficit. It can be done by increasing the relevant user charges, which would also lead to a reduction in their demand. Apart from these first round effects, there would also be positive secondary effects on fiscal deficit, as the overall efficiency in the economy rises with an improved utilisation of scarce resources like water, power and petroleum. With an increase in efficiency, the consequent expansion of tax-bases and rise in tax-revenues would further reduce the fiscal deficit.

== Benefits of subsidies ==
The relative distribution of the benefits of a subsidy may be studied with respect to different classes or groups of beneficiaries such as consumers and producers, as also between different classes of consumers and producers.

- In case of food subsidy, PDS suffers from considerable leakage and apart from a low coverage of poor; the magnitude of benefit derived by the poor is very small.
- In case of electricity, the subsidy rates have been rising for both agriculture and domestic sectors because the unit cost has been rising faster than the relevant tariff-rate. Also, there is considerable variation in the level of per capita electricity subsidy indicates that, in the richer States, the per capita subsidy is substantially higher as compared to that in the poorer States.
- In case of public irrigation, water has a very high marginal productivity when used in conjunction with HYV of seeds, chemical fertilisers, power and other related inputs. It is the richer farmers who may derive relatively larger benefits because of their capacity to use these allied inputs.
- Subsidies to elementary education form about half of the total subsidies on general education. However, this is not true for all individual States: the share of elementary education is lowest in the high income States and the highest in the low income States (Goa, Punjab and West Bengal actually give higher subsidies to secondary education than primary education).A negative correlation between the level of per capita income and the share of subsidies to elementary education is thus discernible. Most subsidies to higher education accrue predominantly to the better-off sections of society as they have an overwhelming advantage in competing out prospective candidates from the poorer sections in getting admission to courses that are characterised by scarcity of seats.
- For subsidies of health, the greater emphasis on curative health care expenditure often reflects a bias towards the better-off people whereas preventive health care expenditure with much larger externalities would clearly be of greater help to the economically weaker sections of the society.

== Agenda for reform ==
The study brings to the fore the massive magnitude of subsidies in the provision of economic and social services by the government. Even if merit subsidies are set aside, the remaining subsidies alone amount to 10.7% of GDP, comprising 3.8% and 6.9% of GDP, pertaining to Centre and State subsidies respectively. The average all-India recovery rate for these non-merit goods/services is just 10.3%, implying a subsidy rate of almost 90%.

The macroeconomic costs of unjustified subsidies are mirrored in persistent large fiscal deficits and consequently higher interest rates. In addition, unduly high levels of subsidisation reflected in corresponding low user charges produce serious micro-economic distortions as well. Its prime manifestations include excessive demand for subsidised services, distortions in relative prices and misallocation of resources. These are discernible in the case of certain input based subsidies. These problems are further compounded where the subsidy regime is plagued by leakages which ensure neither equity nor efficiency.

The agenda for reform should therefore focus on:

- Reducing the overall scale of subsidies
- Making subsidies as transparent as possible
- Using subsidies for well defined economic objectives
- Focusing subsidies to final goods and services with a view to maximising their impact on the target population at minimum cost
- Instituting systems for periodic review of subsidies

== See also ==
- Direct Benefit Transfer
- Give up LPG subsidy
