= Sepon =

Sepon may refer to:

- Sepon, Assam, a town in India
- Xépôn, also known as Sepon, a village in Laos
