= Sarathi Baba =

Indian fraud religious leader

- Born: Santosh Raul; 1968 or 1969 (age 57–58); Ganjam district, Odisha, India
- Other names: Sarathi baba, Srimad Sarathi
- Occupation: Spiritual guru
- Children: Satyam Sekhar Raul (adopted)

Sarathi Baba (born Santosh Raul, 1968 or 1969), also known as Srimad Sarathi Dev, is a self-proclaimed godman from Odisha, India, currently under investigation for fraud and In custody. On 4 August 2015, a TV channel, Prameya News7, ran a report of him being a charlatan The channel claimed that he had stayed in a luxury hotel in Hyderabad with a young woman. The report also included images of him wearing a T-shirt and jeans. This triggered widespread protests in the state. He was arrested on 8 August 2015. As of September 2015, the state police is investigating various charges against him.

== Life ==
Location of Sarathi's Mahipala ashram in Odisha

Sarathi Baba was born as Santosh Kumar Raula in Ganjam district. Later, his family moved to Kendrapara district. His father was an electricity meter reader in Mahipala, Kendrapara. He completed his matriculation from Gulnagar High School, Gulnagar, Kendrapara and joined Kendrapara Autonomous College, Kendrapara. He dropped out and worked as an errand boy for a while before leaving town in 1985.

In 1992, he returned and established a small ashram in Barimula on the Kendrapara-Indupur road. He began organising satsangs. He also began performing miracles like materialising vibhuti and dripping honey from his feet. With this, he began attracting large crowds. He claimed to be an avatar of Krishna and asked his young female devotees to serve him as gopis.

Sarathi Baba's relations had not been amicable with the locals. On 12 November 2013, Kendrapara locals had protested by blockading a highway with burning tires. They said the members and visitors of Sarathi Baba's Barimula ashram were encroaching land by using the main road, the cremation ground and grazing fields for parking. In January 2015, locals met the District Collector Pramod Kumar Das and demanded action against Sarathi. They said that he was encroaching land and hiring goons to quieten them. However, an aide of Sarathi said that the locals were merely jealous of his popularity.

== Controversy ==
=== Exposé ===
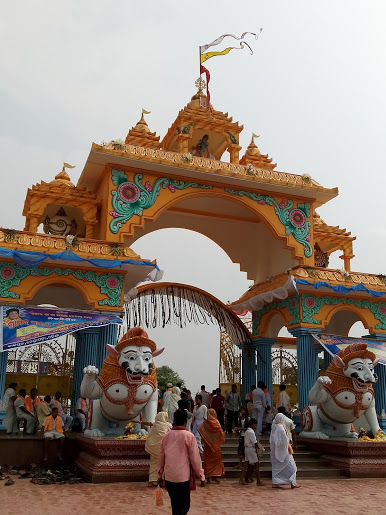
Entrance of the "Sarathi temple"

On 4 August 2015, a TV channel broadcast a report which showed Sarathi Baba in a hotel lobby in Banjara Hills, Hyderabad. The Baba who usually wore traditional whites, was seen in a T-shirt and jeans. He had checked in and stayed with a woman in her 20s, whom he had introduced as his wife, from 3 to 5 July. The report claimed that he had ordered chicken and alcohol. A former aide of Sarathi, Kailash Chandra Mallick, also appeared on the report and said that the Sarathi's public image and miracles were made up.

The TV channels identified the woman as a 24-year-old MBBS student at Shri Ramachandra Bhanj Medical College, Cuttack. Sarathi Baba responded to the report as an attempt to defame him.

=== Protests ===
By 4 August evening, protests had begun in Kendrapara, Bhubaneswar and other parts of the state. On 5 August, a group of Sarathi's devotees organised a press conference to defend him. But, they were surrounded by members of women's rights groups. They had to be rescued by the police. On 5 August, Sarathi Baba told the media that he had not gone to Hyderabad. He admitted those images to be his own. But added that the images were from a hotel in Ujjain. Later, the TV channels produced plane ticket records of Sarathi and his female companion.

On 6 August 2015, the Government of Odisha directed the Crime Branch of Odisha Police to investigate the accusations of sex scandal and financial malpractices against Sarathi. On the same day, police in Barimula lathi charged protestors and damaged vehicles near the ashram. On the same day, the MBBS student's mother told TV channels that her daughter was in her college hostel from 3 to 5 July. Later, the TV channels produced the student's leave application.

On 7 August, the protests continued in Kendrapara district. The protesters pelted stones near the Barimula ashram. The police fired tear gas and lathi charged to dispel the mob. Section 144 of Code of Criminal Procedure, 1973 (illegal assembly) imposed to prevent more rioting. Also on 7 August, Nitinjeet Singh was appointed the Kendrapada Superintendent of police, replacing Satish Gajbhiye. Meanwhile, the MBBS student appeared on a phone interview with a TV channel and said that Sarathi was being trapped in a conspiracy by some of his associates.

Also on late 7 August 2015, the MBBS student filed a complaint at a Cuttack police station that four former associates of Sarathi had been harassing her since before the controversy. She said that they possessed a video of her bathing and had threatened to release it. She added that on their instruction she had insisted to Sarathi that he take her with him to Hyderabad.

=== Arrest and investigation ===
On 8 August 2015, Sarathi was arrested from his ashram. He was booked under Section 420 (fraud), 120 (B) (criminal conspiracy) and 341 (wrongful restraint) of the Indian Penal Code, and also under Arms Act, 1959 and Scheduled Caste and Scheduled Tribe (Prevention of Atrocities) Act, 1989. The woman was sent to her hometown Paradip and given police protection.

The police officials said that Sarathi had admitted to visiting Hyderabad under the interrogation. On 13 August, Satish Gajbhiye was suspended for using excess force while handling the protesters. The police reopened a missing person case from April 2013. He was a devotee and a chit fund agent had gone to Sarathi's ashram but had gone missing. Also the same day, the state education department suspended a public school teacher, Sarat Patra, who was also a close associate of the Baba. Patra had spoken at a press conference in the defence of Sarathi.

On 15 August 2015, the MBBS student filed a first information report (FIR) under claiming that Sarathi's women aides had threatened to kill her if she spoke against him. Also on 15 August 2015, his bail petition was rejected. On 19 August 2015, a woman filed a complaint in Nikirai, Kendrapara, claiming that her husband and her in-laws tortured after she did not submit to Sarathi after her marriage in January 2015. On 19 August, Satyam Sekhar Roul, the adopted son of Sarathi, was arrested from a hotel in Mumbai. He had been in hiding. Also on 19 August, Pramod Mohanty, a close aide of Sarathi, died. His family said that he died due to a heart attack caused by stress and they cremated him without an autopsy in Jagatsinghpur. He was being questioned by the police about his associate with the godman.

On 26 August, the state government admitted to the legislative assembly that it had given grants to Sarathi Baba from public funds. On the recommendations of BJD MLAs, Bed Prakash Agrawal and Pratap Keshari Deb, ₹15.4 lakh (US$16,000) was granted for building a Sarathi community centre and two Sarathi temples. Deb said that people in his constituency had approached him for community centre in Bharatpur near Patrapur. But after it was completed it was named after Sarathi. Agrawal said that he made the recommendation because of the people's demand. Ashok Chandra Panda, the state tourism minister, revealed that Agrawal had recommended that the ashram be designated a tourist spot.

On 27 August, the statement of Surendra Mallick, the manager of the Barimula ashram, was recorded in Kendrapada court. On 28 August, Sarat Patra, a key aide of Sarathi, was arrested by the police. The suspended school teacher was charged with threatening the medical student. Another woman had come forward and complained that Patra had coerced women into having sexual relations with the Baba. On 30 August, more suspects, Pilaski Swain, Biswajit Patnaik and Haris Chandra Das, were arrested. They had allegedly taken ₹20 lakh (US$21,000) from Satyam to help him escape the police. About ₹16.95 lakh (US$18,000) was recovered from them.

On 15 September, Patra's bail bond was approved. On 2 December, Satyam Raul was granted bail by the Odisha High Court.

=== Discovered assets ===
His 2.47 acres (1.00 ha) ashram in Barimula, Kendrapara, has been estimated to be worth ₹4.48 crore (US$470,000). On 12 August 2015, a Crime Branch official told the media that they had found ₹2.55 crore (US$260,000) deposited in about 22 bank accounts belonging to Sarathi. By 14 August, the police has found 50 plots of land worth ₹1 crore (US$100,000) belonging to the Baba. They also found 30–40 branches of Sarathi's organisation across the state. These organisations used to collect cash from devotees. By 23 August, the police had seized ₹27 lakh (US$28,000) from accounts under Satyam's name.

Satyam used to manage the film production company Srimad Sarathi Productions, which used to produce music albums and films. The Odia film Bachelor released in 2012 was its first feature film.

=== Protests against other gurus ===
Following the arrest of Sarathi Baba, people in Odisha began protesting against other alleged fraud spiritual leaders. This forced many gurus to go underground and forced authorities to start investigations against them. On 30 August 2015, protesters vandalised an ashram belonging to Sura Baba on the outskirts of Bhubaneswar, and set fire on several vehicles in the compound. On 31 August, Sura Baba and his two sons were arrested from their ashram. On 5 September 2015, forest officials evicted a godman, Bana Baba, from his ashram Darshanibanta near Konark. His ashram was encroaching 19.6 acres (7.9 ha) of protected forest under the Balukhand-Konark Wildlife Sanctuary.

=== Trial ===
On 17 December 2015, the Crime Branch of Odisha Police formally filed charge-sheets against Sarathi, his son and four others. On 11 January 2016, Sarathi was presented at the sub-divisional judicial magistrate (SDJM) court after a long absence from public sight. A mob of devotees gathered at the premises to get a glimpse of him. Several devotees, mostly women, threw petals on him and attempted to garland him. But, they were held back by the police. Recently Saarthi has got bail.
