= Central Plan Scheme Monitoring System =

Indian public financial management reforms

The Central Plan Scheme Monitoring System (CPSMS) (now called Public Finance Management System or PFMS) is a Government of India public financial management reforms initiative which monitors programs in the social sector and tracks funds disbursed. Given the large number of programs on which the money is spent, the CPSMS is an initiative by the Indian Central Government to ensure that the money is spent according to its intended purpose, and provide an accounting of same.

== History ==
The Economic Survey (2007–08) emphasized the need for effective financial monitoring of the Plan Schemes. The Finance Minister in his Budget Speech (2008–09) announced the establishment of a comprehensive Decision Support System and Management Information System. The 11th Plan Document also recognized the deficiencies in the existing accounting system for the Plan Schemes and its inability to support informed planning, budgeting and effective monitoring of these schemes. It also underlined the need for a consolidated financial information system for the Plan Schemes.

The EFC of the Planning Commission approved the implementation of CPSMS in a phased manner. The Finance Minister accorded its approval in principle for the entire scheme. Administrative and financial approval for Part A of the Scheme, with an outlay of Rs. 24.25 crores, was received.

By 2009, the system was available in all the central ministries and all the state, ministry and scheme reports were available to users in these ministries. The system was being implemented in the four states: of Madhya Pradesh, Bihar, Mizoram and Punjab. The CPSMS-CBS interface was functional and was providing real time information exchange with the banks. The Planning Commission also decided to fast-track work on the system.

=== 2009-10 ===
By the 2009-10 financial year the CPSMS had made significant strides since its initial roll out. The dedicated web portal of CPSMS was operational and had registered more than 8.00 lakhs hits. All the Plan Schemes of Civil Ministries have been mapped and about 75,000 Sanctions were issued. All releases from the Government of India under Plan Schemes were now made through CPSMS, and all agencies receiving these releases were registered on the CPSMS Portal. More than 800,000 agencies have been registered. Ministry, Scheme, State-wise, District, NGO, Individual data of releases from GOI are available centrally on CPSMS in real time. The CPSMS data is fully reconciled with the accounting data of Controller General of Accounts.

Central Plan Scheme Monitoring System has successfully integrated with the Core Banking Solution (CBS) of 150 banks all over India. It includes the public sector banks and major private sector banks.

CPSMS won the Microsoft Developer Innovation & Excellence Award in 2009.

The CPSMS, after successfully completing the pilots, started pilots on e-payments to beneficiaries under various social sector schemes leveraging its CPSMS-CBS interface. Thus it provides a platform for the schemes for making payments directly in the bank accounts of beneficiaries.

Planning Commission, Government of India issued an office memorandum, making CPSMS mandatory for Direct Benefit Transfer Scheme of Government of India. CPSMS serves as the central MIS for all DBT transactions.

== Why CPSMS ==
There are over 1045 plans being implemented in the priority social sector, aimed at millions of beneficiaries across India, through the different ministries of the central government of India. Moreover, the Central Government also releases funds under Additional Central Assistance program to states to use within their region. Approximately ₹3 lakh crore (US$35 billion) are released under these channels each year. Given the diversity in and number of channels through which the money is spent, the Central Government finds it necessary to ensure that the money is spent according to its intended purpose, and provide an accounting of same.

CPSMS' purpose is to provide greater transparency and accountability to social sector monitoring that has not existed until now. Financial utilization can be put in the public domain, and fund transfers to grassroots entities and utilization by them can be accessed by interested individuals and organizations. Only about 20% of these funds are routed to states through the Treasury route and 80% of funds are sent through Special Purpose Vehicles, which have weaker intrinsic internal control mechanisms available in the Treasury mechanism.

The current program-specific MISs operate with time lags and do not give a clear picture of funds remaining unutilized in each fiscal year. While funds released by the central government are immediately booked as expenditure in the Central Government accounts, utilization in the field takes time and while commercial banks enjoy the float, the Central Government must borrow to meet its fiscal deficit. This is attributable to the absence of a system that could quickly provide consolidated or granular information on utilization, advances, fund transfers or bank balances across schemes, districts, blocks or institutions. By the time utilization reports reach the State and Central level, the data is already historical, significantly limiting its utility. CPSMS will aid in better fiscal deficit management, and to ultimately move to a system of flow of authorization as against the actual flow of funds, whereby banks will first meet the expenses of the implementing agencies and then seek reimbursement from the Central Government.

MISs based on post facto data feeding suffer from drawbacks of inefficiencies, inconsistencies, gaps and perennial reconciliations, as they are not integrated with the process flow. CPSMS attempts to address this, and the associated issues of transparency and accountability related to the SPV mode of implementation, keeping all the advantages of the mode intact.

== Modus operandi ==
The system uses a web-enabled application developed in the office of Controller General of Accounts, the apex accounting authority of the Government of India under Ministry of Finance (India). In the first step, every agency receiving funds is registered on the system, including registration of all the bank accounts of the agency; this information is shared with the respective banks’ Core Banking System (CBS) for authentication.

After registration, CPSMS will enable one to one validation or payment authorization of each release of funds, whether expenditure, advance, or transfer. The corresponding instrument number and amount for any release would need to be entered in the system at the time of approval, before the actual transaction. Through the CPSMS-CBS interface, this information would be shared with the banks' CBS and an instrument of payment will be honored by banks only when the corresponding entry is received through the CPSMS.
