= Jasdan State =

Historical State

Coordinates: 22.03°N 71.2°E

Jasdan State જસદણ
- Princely State
- 1665–1948
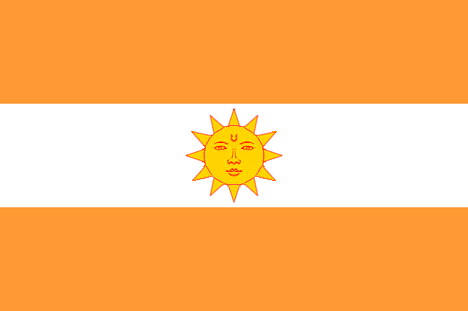
- Flag

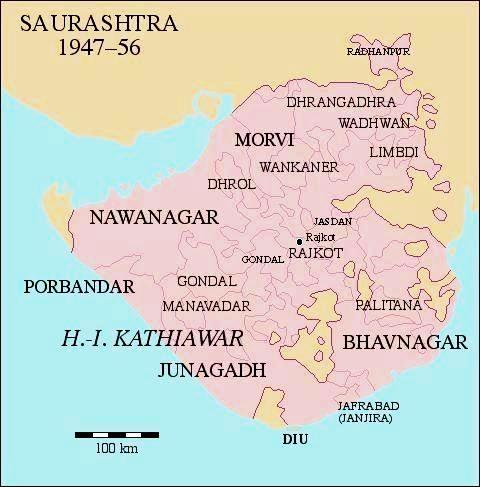
- Location of Jasdan State in Saurashtra
- Capital: Jasdan
- Area
  - 1921: 767 km^{2} (296 sq mi)
- Population
  - 1921: 30,633
- History
  - Established: 1665
  - Indian independence: 1948
Succeeded by
India

Jasdan State was a princely state in Saurashtra during the British Raj. Its last ruler signed the accession to the Indian Union on 15 February 1948. The capital of the state was in Jasdan town.

== History ==
Jasdan state was founded in 1665 when Vika Khachar defeated the Khumans of Kherdi. In 1807, after its ruler Vajsur Khachar came to an agreement with the British and the Gaikwar, it became a British protectorate. Later in the 19th century Jasdan became part of the Kathiawar Agency of the Bombay Presidency.

Jasdan was the biggest kathi state in British India issuing its own postage stamps.

== Rulers of Jasdan ==
The rulers of the state bore the title 'Khachar'.

Darbar Shri Ala Vajsur signed the Instrument of Accession on 15 February 1948 and annexed Jasdan into the Union of India.

=== Notable members of royal family ===
- Lavkumar Khachar, ornithologist

== See also ==
- Political integration of India
- Baroda, Western India and Gujarat States Agency
- Saurashtra (region)
