= Ara Civil Court bombing =

2015 prison escape scheme

- Ara (India) Location of blast
- Location: 25°33′48″N 84°39′53″E; Arrah, Bihar, India
- Date: 23 January 2015; 11:30 am (UTC + 5:30)
- Attack type: suicide bombing
- Deaths: 3 (including the bomber)
- Injuries: 7+
- Motive: Help undertrial prisoners escape

On 23 January 2015, a bomb went off at the civil court premises of Ara, Bhojpur district, Bihar, India in order to facilitate a prison escape.

== Blast ==
There was a blast in the civil court premises around 11:35 am IST. A suspected woman might have carried out the suicide bombing as per initial findings. Two persons along with the woman were killed in the blast, one of them was a police constable. At least seven more people were injured in the attack. Taking advantage of the chaos following the blast, two criminals under trial who were brought to the court for a hearing fled the premises.

== Investigation ==
Bihar Police searched the whole court premises. The police arrested Sunil Pandey, the Janata Dal (United) politician, in connection with the crime.

Additional Director General of Police Gupteshwar Pandey said the woman was carrying the bomb in her purse and it had exploded accidentally, denying she was a suicide bomber. The woman was identified as Rina Gaudh, the district magistrate of Bhojpur said she was trying to help two prisoners escape, she didn't carry out a terror attack.

In 2019, Lambu Sharma was sentenced to a life term for his role in the attack. Sharma, a local gangster and explosives expert was one of the prisoners that successfully fled when the blast went off.
