= Bhakti Sharma =

Indian open-air swimmer

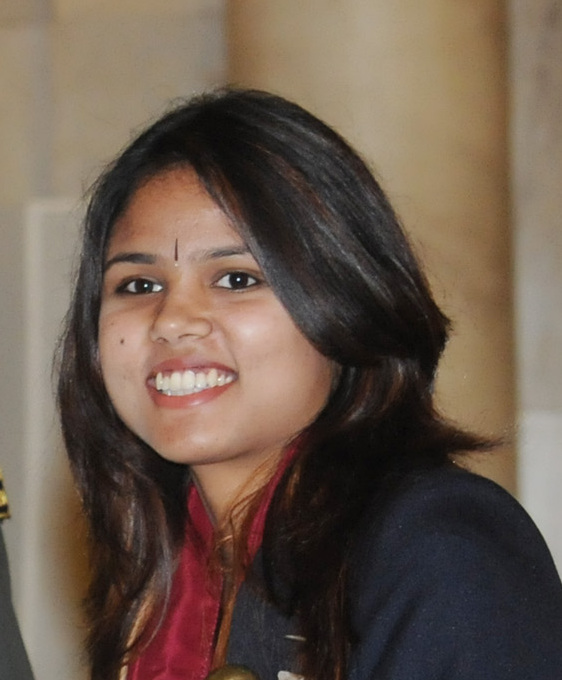
- Sharma in 2012
- Born: 30 November 1989 (age 36); Mumbai, Maharashtra, India
- Occupation: Open water swimmer
- Years active: 2003–present
- Awards: Tenzing Norgay National Adventure Award, 2010
- Website: bhaktisharma.in

Bhakti Sharma (born 30 November 1989) is an Indian Open water swimmer. She is the first Asian woman and the youngest in the world to set a record in open swimming in Antarctic waters. Sharma swam 1.4 miles (2.3 km) in 41.14 minutes, at a temperature of 1 °C (34 °F), breaking the record of Lynne Cox (USA) and Lewis Pugh (Great Britain). Bhakti Sharma has swum in all the five oceans of the world, besides swimming in or across eight other seas and channels. She was awarded the Tenzing Norgay National Adventure Award in 2010.

On June 22, 2016, A. R. Rahman tweeted to support the crowdfunding campaign started by Sharma on Fueladream.com.

== Early life ==
Sharma was born in Mumbai and brought up in Udaipur, Rajasthan. She holds a master's degree from Symbiosis School of Media and Communication, Bengaluru in Communications Management, and holds a bachelor's degree in commerce from Mohan Lal Sukhadia University, Udaipur, Rajasthan.

== Swimming career ==
Sharma started swimming at a young age of 2 1/2 years, coached by her mother Leena Sharma. After having participated in many State and District Level competitions, her first open water (Sea) swim was a 16 km swim from Uran port to Gateway of India in 2003. Sharma was just 14 years old that time.

Along with her Mother-Coach Leena Sharma and friend Priyanka Gehlot, Bhakti holds the Asian record for the first swim by a 3-member women's relay team across the English Channel. She also shares a world record with her mother for being the first mother-daughter pair to swim across the English Channel, a feat that they achieved in 2008.

Sharma is only the third person in the world to have swum in the Arctic Ocean, and recently swam in the Antarctic Ocean to become the youngest to swim in all five oceans, a feat which earned her recognition from Prime Minister Narendra Modi.

Sharma's swimming career's major milestones include :

- 2006: Crossed the English Channel in 13 hours 55 minutes on 6 July at the age of 16 from Shakespeare Beach, Dover England to Calais, France
- 2006: Winning the Lake Zurich Swim
- 2007: Swam 25 km in Gulf of Mexico as a part of 2007 U.S.A Swimming Open Water Championships in Fort Myers Beach, Florida.
- 2007: Completed the Swim around the Rock (Alcatraz), a race of 6.5 km in the Pacific Ocean.
- 2007: Won a gold medal in Marathon swim around the Key West Island, Atlantic Ocean that made here the first Asian swimmer to participate in three major American swimming events.
- 2007: Crossed the Strait Of Gibraltar in the Mediterranean Sea at Tarifa, Spain, considered as one of the most challenging sea courses, in 5 hours and 13 minutes.
- 2010: Successfully swam a distance of 1.8 km in 33 minutes in the Arctic Ocean, and in the process became the second and youngest swimmer in the World to swim in 4 oceans.

National Swims

- 2004: Successfully swam a distance of 36 km from Dharamtal to Gateway of India, Indian Ocean in 9 hours and 30 minutes.
- 2008: Created an Indian record along with her mother Leena Sharma and friend Priyanka Gehlot by covering a distance of 72 km in 16 Hours, 58 minutes from Dharamtal to Gateway of India, Mumbai, and back.

== Recent record ==
On January 10, 2015, Sharma became the youngest in the world and first Asian girl to swim in the freezing water of Antarctica for 2.25 km, beating the record of British open water swimming champion Lewis Pugh and American swimmer Lynne Cox. Sharma swam for 41.14 minutes, covering 2.25 km distance in the freezing waters of Antarctica while the temperature was only one degree Celsius. She performed the record-breaking swim with the sponsorship of Hindustan Zinc Limited.

== Public Speaking ==
Sharma is also a public speaker; she has been invited to speak about her experiences at various national and international speaker platforms. Some of the well-documented speaker opportunities include

- Bhakti Sharma's TED Talk- What open water swimming taught me about resilience
- Bhakti Sharma at IIT Kanpur - "Lessons learnt from the seven seas" "Bhakti Sharma at IIT Kanpur" on YouTube
- Fighting against odds: Bhakti Sharma at TEDxNMIMS "Bhakti Sharma at TEDxNMIMS" on YouTube
- From desert to Antarctica - a swimmer's journey and lessons learnt | Bhakti Sharma | TEDxIIMUdaipur "Bhakti Sharma at TEDxIIMUdaipur" on YouTube
- TEDxSIBMBangalore - Ms. Bhakti Sharma "Pride of India" - Challenging The Conventional "Bhakti Sharma at TEDxSIBMBangalore" on YouTube
- Bhakti Sharma delivers a talk at Vodafone Zonathon "Bhakti Sharma at Vodafone Zonathon" on YouTube
- Bhakti Sharma at Shakti Sundays, Udaipur "Bhakti Sharma at Shakti Sundays, Udaipur" on YouTube
