= Balukhand-Konark Wildlife Sanctuary =

Wildlife sanctuary in the state of Odisha, India

Balukhand Konark Sanctuary
- IUCN category IV (habitat/species management area)
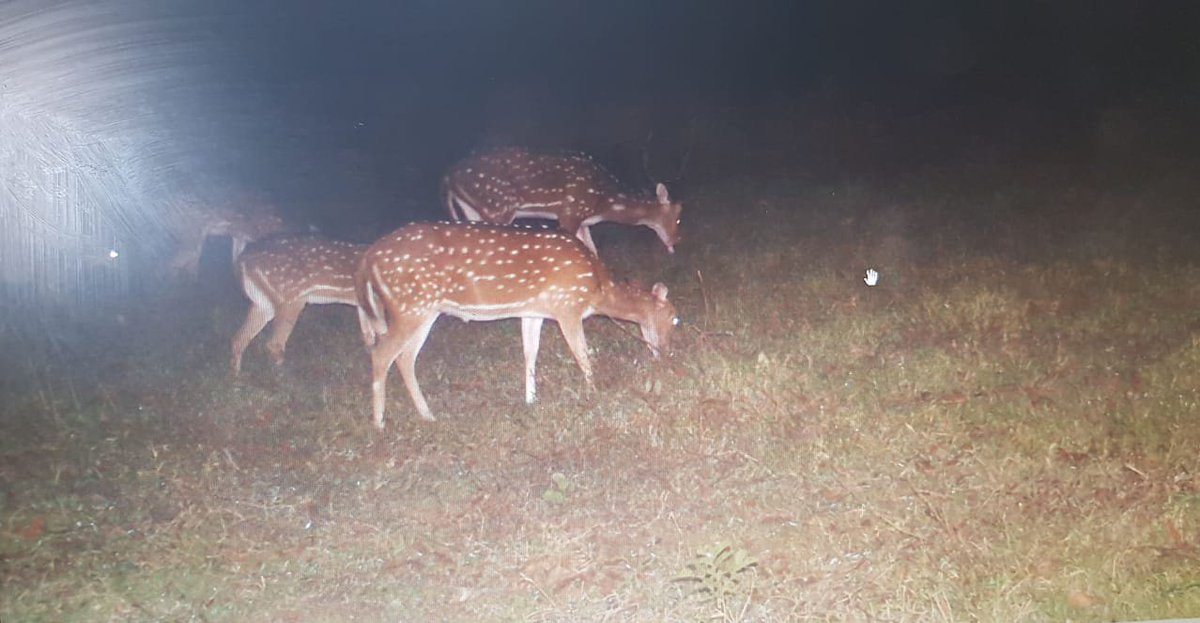
- Spotted deers at Balukhand Sanctuary

- Location within Odisha Location within India
- Interactive map of Balukhand Konark Sanctuary
- Location: Odisha, India
- Nearest city: Puri
- Coordinates: 19.8619°N 86.0477°E
- Area: 87 square kilometres (34 sq mi)
- Established: 1984
- Website: www.wildlife.odisha.gov.in/WebPortal/PA_Balukhand-Konark.aspx

The Balukhand-Konark Wildlife Sanctuary is a wildlife sanctuary located in the Indian state of Odisha.

The sanctuary has an area of 87 km^{2}, and is located along the Bay of Bengal coast, between the towns of Puri and Konark. The sanctuary includes sandy beaches, coastal dunes, groves of introduced Casuarina trees planted in 1916–17, and cashew plantations. Little of the native flora remains. The sanctuary was designated in 1984. This place is extremely suitable for the development of ecological tourism.

== Fauna ==
The sanctuary is home to a herd of blackbuck and spotted deer. Other animals found in the sanctuary include monkey, squirrel, jungle cat, hyena, jackal, mongoose and variety of birds and reptiles. Olive ridley sea turtles nest on the beaches.

Blackbucks were present in the sanctuary until 2012, but they eventually disappeared, mainly due to habitat loss and increasing human interference. In Jume 2024, the blackbucks were released into the sanctuary from the zoo. In September 2024, 13 more were released.
