= Jagjit Singh Anand =

Indian communist activist and journalist

- ਜਗਜੀਤ ਸਿੰਘ ਆਨੰਦ
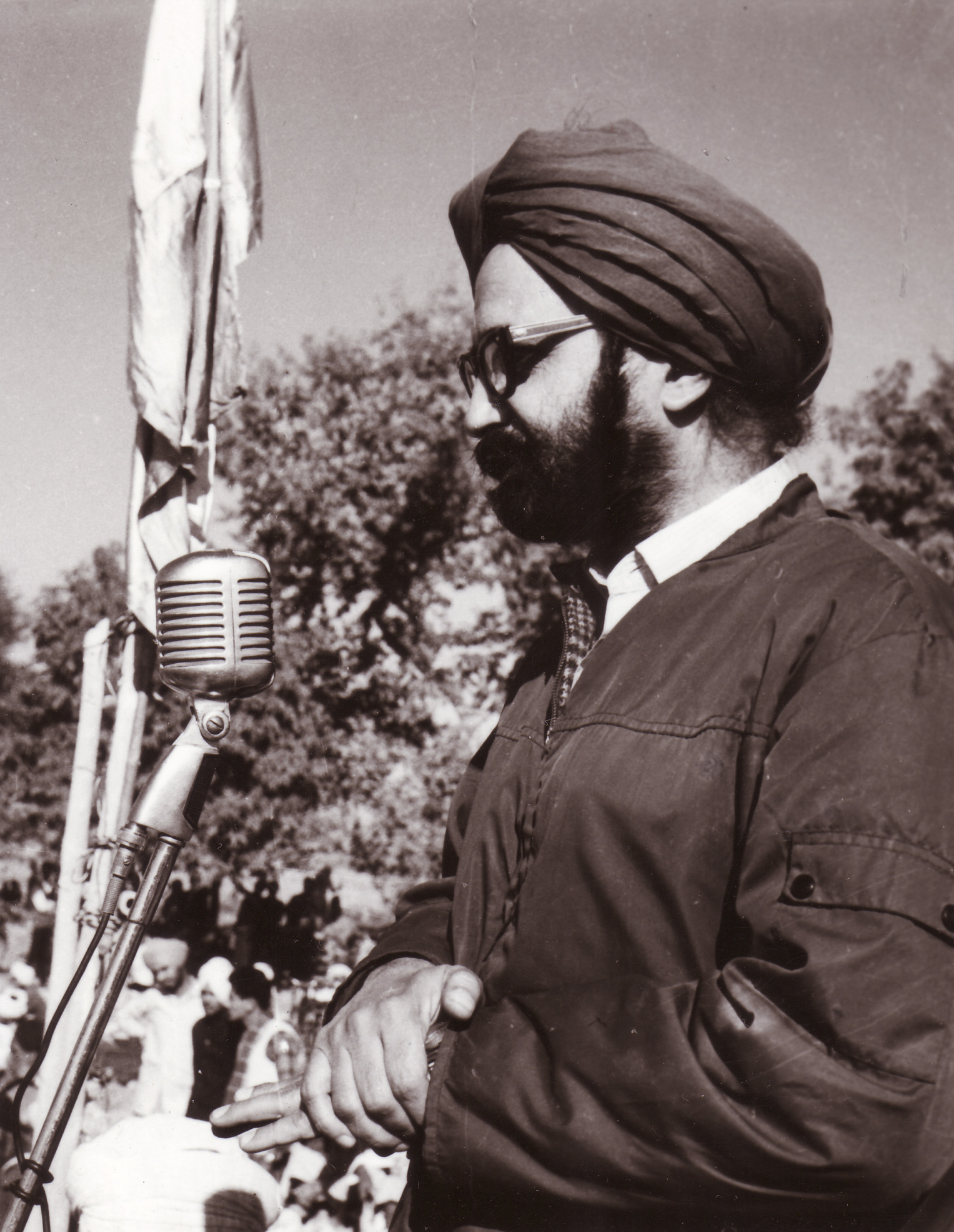
- Jagjit Singh Anand at the funeral of Sohan Singh Bhakna in 1968
- Born: 28 December 1921; Tarn Taran, Punjab, India
- Died: 19 June 2015 (aged 93); Jalandhar, Punjab, India
- Occupations: journalist, author, translator, communist politician, parliamentarian
- Years active: 1937-2010
- Notable work: Chete di changer chon, Communist Lehar de ang sang, Cheta chog chuge
- Political party: Communist Party of India
- Spouse: Urmilla Anand ( 15.10.1928- 14.03.2013)
- Children: Sukirat Anand, Suangna Anand

Jagjit Singh Anand (28 December 1921 – 19 June 2015) was an Indian communist activist, journalist, author, and freedom fighter. He was the editor of Nawan Zamana for more than half a century. He is known for his plain speaking on the opportunism of the Akalis,, the Congress, and the terrorists during the Punjab Crisis in the last two decades of the twentieth century. Anand countered death threats defiantly: "I will not be cowed down by death threats and attempts on my life by the extremists and I will uphold the freedom of the press at all costs."

Born in 1921 at Taran Taaran to Mehtab Singh and Tejwant Kaur, he was initially educated in the local Guru Arjan Dev Khalsa High School where his father was the headmaster. Later he joined Forman Christian College, Lahore, where he cut his political teeth and was the General Secretary of Lahore Students' Union from 1938 to 1941. During these years he joined the Communist Party of India and rose to its highest ranks in the post independence years . Here he also came in contact with Navtej Singh, then a young son of established Punjabi writer Gurbakhsh Singh Preet Lari, and later an important Punjabi short story writer on his own. Together they translated Wanda Vasiliuska's novel 'Rainbow' into Punjabi, whose Punjabi version known as 'Satrangi Peengh' has never been out of print for almost 70 years now and is considered a landmark translation. Their friendship also led to Jagjit Singh Anand marrying Navtej Singh's younger sister Urmilla, a writer in her own right, in 1951.

Jagjit Singh Anand strode the twin political and literary careers throughout his life. A journalist by profession he was a prolific writer and translator and has more than 30 publications to his credit. He was the founder and executive member of Kendriya Punjabi Lekhak Sabha since its establishment in 1956. He was honored with the Soviet Land Nehru Award for the best translator in 1965 and the Journalist of the Year Award by the government of Punjab in 1971.

In 1974, he was elected to the Upper House of Indian Parliament, Rajya Sabha, to represent the state of Punjab. He also served as a President of Northern Railways Workers' Union and the North India University Employees' Federation. He was also the Working President of All India University and College Employees' Federation.

He remained the Chief Editor of Daily Nawan Zamana from 1963 until his death in June 2015.

== Notableworks ==
Chete di changer chon, Communist Lehar de ang sang, Cheta chog chuge

== Books ==
- Chete di changer chon
- " Communist Lehar de ang sang"
- Cheta Chog Chuge
- Soviet society and communist party (1976)
- Soviet Union in world affairs (1977)
