= Murder of Burhan Bashir Bhat =

2015 child murder in Sopore, India

Burhan Bashir Bhat was a three-year-old boy who was killed by unidentified gunmen on 19 September 2015 when he and his father were walking home in Jammu and Kashmir's Sopore in India.

Burhan's father, Bashir Ahmad Bhat, who was identified as having been part of the militant organization Jamiat-ul-Mujahideen 15 years earlier, was also killed. Burhan was shot three times, and died in the hospital the following day. After his death, Burhan Bashir Bhat became a symbol for regional conflict and lack of governmental accountability.

He was compared in the media to Alan Kurdi — the three-year-old Syrian boy of Kurdish ethnic origin whose images brought about an onslaught of global outrage after he drowned in the Mediterranean Sea during part of a great Syrian refugee crisis. Hurriyat separatist leader Syed Ali Shah Geelani called for protests on 20 September 2015 against the killings in Kashmir Valley. Everyday life was affected in Kashmir Valley following a strike called for by the Hurriyat Conference organization to protest the killing.
