= Direct Benefit Transfer =

Indian program for public money subsidies delivery-benefits trail

Direct Benefit Transfer (DBT)
- Country: India
- Prime Minister(s): Launched under PM Manmohan Singh and expanded under PM Narendra Modi
- Ministry: DBT Mission, Cabinet Secretariat
- Launched: 1 January 2013; 13 years ago
- Status: Active
- Website: dbtbharat.gov.in

Direct Benefit Transfer (Note: The DBT Handbook 2013 differentiates between cash, benefit and subsidy transfers; a cash transfer could be used for any purpose by the beneficiary, say to increase overall consumption, a benefit transfer refers to a cash transfer to the beneficiary for use on a specific government scheme. In some cases this was initially known as Direct Cash Transfer (DCT) scheme, the relevant committee the 'National Committee on Direct Cash Transfers'. Electronic Benefit Transfer (EBT) was already present in the country.) or DBT is an attempt to change the mechanism of transferring subsidies launched by Government of India on 1 January 2013. This scheme or program aims to establish a Giro system to transfer subsidies directly to the people through their linked bank accounts. It is hoped that crediting subsidies into bank accounts will reduce leakages, duplicity and delay and the new processes will increase transparency and accountability.

While initial DBT implementation has solved certain delivery issues and met some of its objectives, it has created a new set of concerns to be dealt with. For the successful implementation of DBT, beneficiaries were made aware of the importance of creating and keeping a bank account. Nationwide financial literacy and financial inclusion schemes such as PM's Jan Dhan Yojana (PM's People's Wealth Scheme) launched in August 2014 and the JAM Yojana, that is the bank-mobile-identification trinity, were started to this effect. Literacy and social issues also impact the beneficiary. Tracking deposits, reading SMS notifications, knowing the correct amount of money that is owed, ensuring that the correct amount has been deposited, and mobility are some barriers faced by female beneficiaries in rural areas.

In the 1980s, Prime Minister Rajiv Gandhi had stated that only 15 paise out of every rupee spent reaches the poor. In this context the Modi government has stated that now every paisa, aided by direct transfer, reaches the intended beneficiary.

== History ==
A precursor to DBT was the 2006 Andhra Pradesh smartcard project. Internationally similar precedents include Mexico's social assistance program Oportunidades started in 2002, based on an earlier program Progresa from 1997. Similar pilots include Bangladesh's Shombhob and Kenya's Give Directly UCT. Conditional cash transfer has also been initiated in countries like South Africa, Jamaica and Turkey. Brazil's first cash credit transfer was in 1996.

On 14 February 2011 a task force under Nandan Nilekani was set up to suggest solutions to creating a system to undertake direct transfer of benefits to beneficiaries.

A DBT Mission was created as the nodal agency. It was set up under the Planning Commission, shifted to the Department of Expenditure in the Finance Ministry and then the Cabinet Secretariat in September 2015. This signaled that DBT was not the domain of any one ministry and that various ministries would have to prioritize implementation under central oversight.

The primary aim of this Direct Benefit Transfer program is to bring transparency and terminate pilferage from distribution of funds sponsored by Central Government of India. In DBT, benefit or subsidy will be directly transferred to citizens living below poverty line.

Central Plan Scheme Monitoring System (CPSMS), now the Public Financial Management System (PFMS), being implemented by the Office of Controller General of Accounts (Ministry of Finance), acts as the common platform for routing DBT. CPSMS/PFMS is used for the preparation of beneficiary list, digitally signing the same and processing of payments in the bank accounts of the beneficiary using the Aadhaar Payment Bridge of NPCI.

The program was launched in selected cities of India on 1 January 2013. Former Union Minister for Rural Development of India Jairam Ramesh and former Chief Minister of Andhra Pradesh N. Kiran Kumar Reddy inaugurated the scheme at Gollaprolu in East Godavari district on 6 January 2013.

Enabled by the Jan Dhan, Aadhaar, and Mobile (JAM) trio. It utilizes core banking and electronic funds transfer services such as National Electronic Funds Transfer (NEFT). Between FY2013 and FY 2021, fund transfer was valued at ₹21 lakh crore (US$220 billion).

Enrolment requires that the intended beneficiary has a bank account and an Aadhaar. Then the person must get the bank account linked to the Aadhar, and then finally linked with the scheme that is to be availed. This requires submission of a number of documents, significant travel time for some, and hesitations due to various social reasons and communication issues.

=== DBT schemes ===
Number of schemes under DBT. Total schemes in 2021-22 is 313 (cash + in kind).

DBT came into effect on 1 January 2013 with seven central sector schemes in 20 districts. In effect only 1 district was able to manage the roll out. Following a prime ministerial review, the government decided to extend DBT to 27 central schemes in 78 more districts of the country from 1 July 2013.

On 1 June 2013, the minister of petroleum and natural gas, M Veerappa Moily formally launched the direct benefit transfer scheme for LPG (DBTL) in 20 high Aadhaar coverage districts. The subsidy on LPG cylinders would be credited directly to consumers' Aadhaar-linked bank accounts. All Aadhaar-linked domestic LPG consumers will get an advance in their bank account as soon as they book the first subsidized cylinder before delivery. On receiving the first subsidized cylinder, subsidy for next will again get credited in their bank account, which can then be available for the purchase of the next cylinder at market rate until the cap of 12 cylinders per year is reached. A modified Direct Benefit Transfer of LPG (DBTL) scheme in 54 districts in 11 states was started 15 November 2014 whereby LPG consumers who have not yet availed the benefit will be able to get cash subsidy amount transferred into their accounts to buy liquefied petroleum gas (LPG) cylinders at market price. Unlike the application of DBT in LPG subsidies, utilization of DBT in food and fertilizer subsidies has seen the cash flow to different locations, and accordingly difference in subsidy retrieval mechanism by the beneficiary.

In a review by the Prime Minister's Office on 5 August 2013, the minutes reported that two schemes dominated transfers through CPSMS - 83% of all transfers were for the Janani Suraksha Yojana and scholarships. Lack of computerized records for schemes to be linked to DBT was hindering rollout. The minutes show that out of 39.76 lakh beneficiaries who ought to have been covered under various schemes, only 56% had bank accounts, 25.3% had both bank accounts and aadhaar numbers, but only 9.62% have bank accounts seeded with aadhaar numbers.

74 schemes of 17 ministries of central government were under DBT by 31 May 2016. By August 2019, 439 central schemes had been included and about 3,486 state/UT schemes identified. By March 2022 this 313 CS/CSSs from 53 ministries were on the DBT website.

== See also ==
Benefits related

- Public Distribution System
- Subsidies in India
- Malnutrition in India
- Central Plan Scheme Monitoring System
- Indian ration card
- Farmer Welfare and Agriculture Development

Digital related

- India Stack
- Aadhaar
- Unified Payments Interface
- Buy Now Pay Later
