= Give up LPG subsidy =

Indian government scheme

Give Up LPG Subsidy is a campaign that was launched in March 2015 by the Indian government led by Prime Minister Narendra Modi. It is aimed at motivating LPG users who are able to afford to pay the market price for LPG to voluntarily surrender their LPG subsidy. As of 23 April 2016, 10 million people had voluntarily given up the subsidy. The surrendered subsidy is being redistributed by the government in order to provide cooking gas connections to poor families in rural households free of cost. Maharashtra, Uttar Pradesh, Karnataka, Delhi and Tamil Nadu are the top five states to give up the subsidy.

== Overview ==
=== Liquefied Petroleum Gas (LPG) ===
Liquefied Petroleum Gas (LPG) is a flammable hydrocarbon gas that includes propane, butane and mixtures of these gases. LPG is derived from natural gas processing and oil refining, and is liquefied under low pressure. It can be used as a heating, cooking and automobile fuel. Due to its low carbon and low sulphur content, LPG produces fewer airborne particulates than an equivalent weight of e.g., charcoal. LPG is a versatile fuel and its use results in lower carbon dioxide emissions. The combustion of LPG produces 81% of the carbon dioxide (per kWh) produced by burning oil and only 70% that of coal. In addition, it requires very little infrastructure, and is easily transportable which makes it a preferred fuel choice in both developing and developed nations.

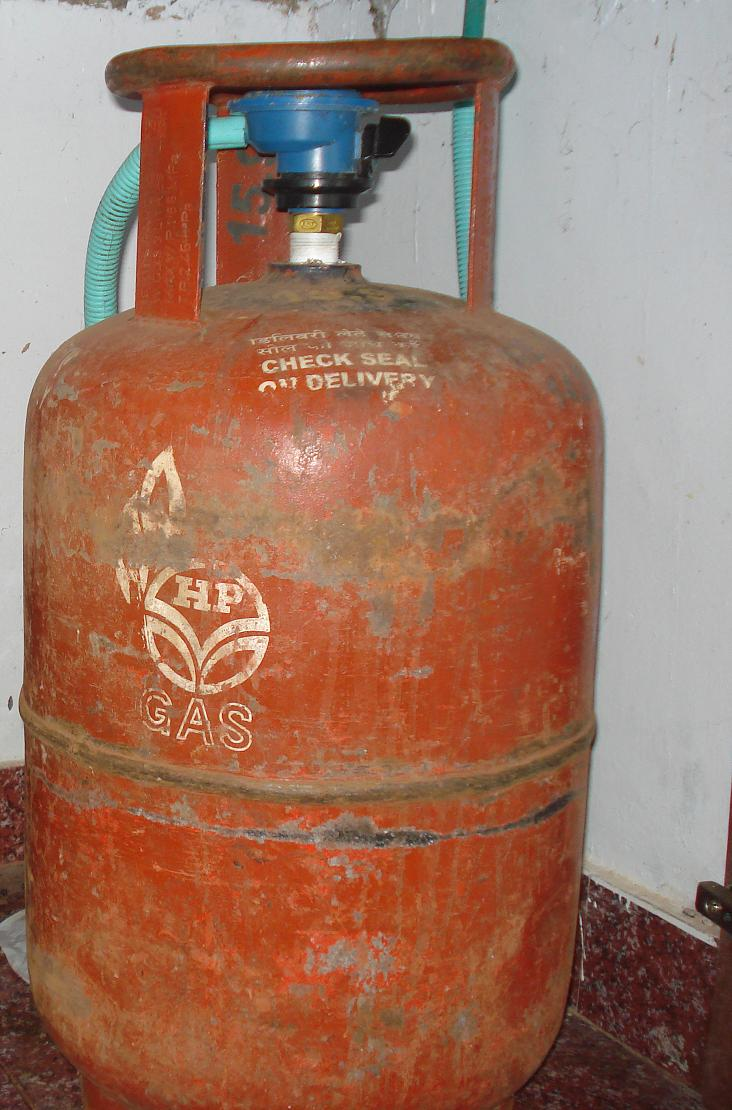

In India, LPG is predominantly used for cooking purposes. Most of the LPG in India is imported, and it is subsidised by the central government for Indian citizens. It is the second largest consumer of liquefied petroleum gases in the world, with LPG consumption growing at an average rate of 8.4%. The increase in consumption is attributed to the BJP government’s Pradhan Mantri Ujwala Yojana scheme.

=== Pradhan Mantri Ujjwala Yojana Scheme ===
The Pradhan Mantri Ujjwala Yojana scheme was launched in 2016 under the government of Prime Minister Modi, and originally targeted providing LPG connections to rural women of below the poverty line (BPL) households. The target was initially to provide 50 million free LPG connections in three years, which was then extended to provide 80 million connections in eight years. The list was later expanded to include all Scheduled Tribe/Scheduled Caste households and Adivasis. Currently, the scheme is extended to all rural households, in order to cover BPL families who are not beneficiaries of LPG connections.

Through the scheme, the Indian government provides a subsidy of INR1,600 to state-owned fuel retailers for every free LPG connection they provide to rural households. The subsidy aims to cover the security fee and fitting charges of the gas cylinder. The beneficiary of the subsidy must then purchase their cooking stove. Potential financial burdens are alleviated as the scheme allows beneficiaries to pay for the cost of the first stove and the first refill in monthly installments. Following this, subsequent refills are paid for by the beneficiary household.

The official objectives of the Pradhan Mantri Ujjwala Yojana scheme are to empower women and protect their health, reduce the serious health hazards associated with cooking utilising fossil fuels, reducing the number of deaths due to unclean cooking fuels and preventing young children from acute respiratory illnesses caused by indoor air pollution as a result of fossil fuels being burned.

=== Changes in LPG Consumption ===
Since April 2015, the proportion of Indian households using LPG, has increased from 56.2 percent to 89 percent. This is indicative of an increase of 33.2 percent, driven by the popularisation of cleaner fuel alternatives and LPG subsidies. State oil companies have added 100 million consumers since April 2015, which has expanded the active consumer base by two-thirds. The government records the highest LPG coverage ratio, which is calculated by looking at the number of subscribers compared to the estimated current population. The Northern states of Chandigarh, Haryana, Himachal Pradesh, Jammu and Kashmir, Uttarakhand record a 100 percent subscription of LPG fuel, whereas Southern states have a coverage of 99.7 percent. Western Indian states have a coverage ratio of 81.9 percent, and Eastern states have the least access to clean energy, with a 74.6 percent coverage.

Dr. M.M. Kutty, the Petroleum Secretary, claimed that LPG consumption in India is forecasted to grow by 34 percent by 2025.

== Economic Theory ==
=== Positive Externalities ===
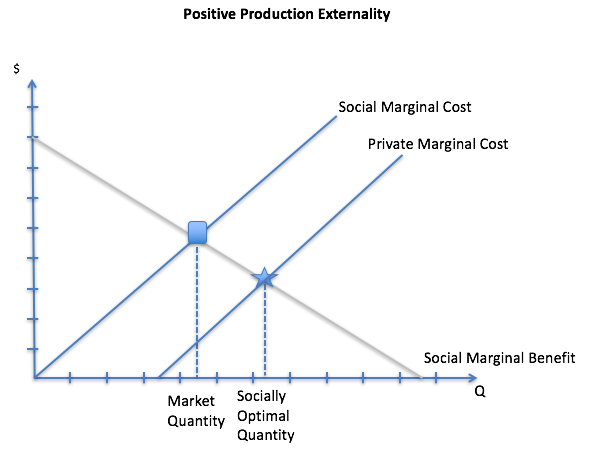

Positive externalities can be either positive production externalities or positive consumption externalities. Positive externalities benefit third-parties by increasing the well-being of others without receiving compensation in return. This leads to underproduction of the good, with an associated deadweight loss.

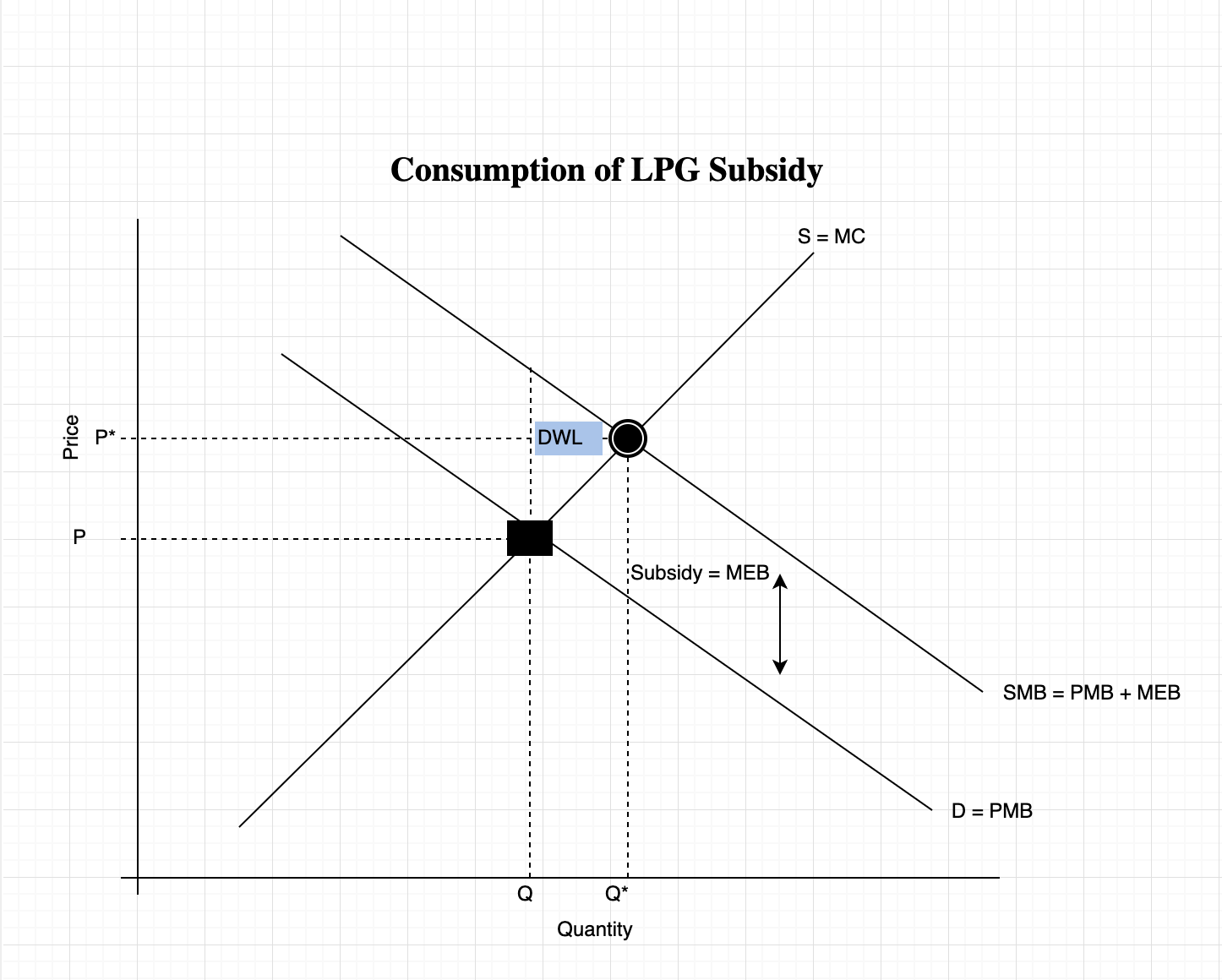
A microeconomic graph representing the LPG subsidy

=== Subsidies: Internalising the Externality ===
One of the public-sector solutions to externalities is by implementing subsidies, or making a payment, that lowers the cost of consumption or production respectively. Therefore, a subsidy is a marginal external benefit that can either lower the social cost or increase the social benefit. In the case of LPG consumption, the government lowers the cost of consumption through subsidies, thus allowing more people to be able to access the cleaner fuel. This results in an increase in the quantity consumed, therefore letting it reach its socially optimal amount.

== Surrendering the LPG Subsidy ==
=== Campaign ===
In March 2015, the Indian government launched the ‘Give It Up' scheme which aims to motivate LPG users who are able to afford to pay the market price for LPG, to voluntarily surrender their LPG subsidy. This is intended to increase the budget for subsidising a larger number of LPG connections, whereby the government has targeted to provide 80 million connections in eight years of conception. Initially, households that elected to surrender their LPG subsidy were eligible to reapply for the subsidised connection.

In January 2016 however, the government announced an income-based criteria for access to subsidised LPG. This excluded all of the connections of households in which one or more members earned a taxable income of INR 1,000,000.

=== Direct Benefit Transfers ===
A Direct Benefit Transfer is a mechanism instituted by the government in March 2013. It aims to prevent leakages in welfare delivery by directly transferring subsidies into the beneficiary's bank account (thus making the eligibility of receiving a subsidy contingent on having a bank account or since the implementation of Aadhaar, an Aadhaar number). The DBT mechanism was implemented in order to curb 'ghost beneficiaries'. Therefore, the Direct Benefit Transfers are also the means of which individuals can surrender their LPG subsidy, by completing a form online and then they will no longer receive the DBT into their account from the government.

Direct Benefit Transfers are disadvantageous in that they may act as an exclusionary policy, by excluding households who do not have bank accounts or Aadhaar numbers. On the other hand, they may be advantageous as they reduce fuel purchases in the domestic sector, which is indicative of a reduction in subsidy diversions via 'ghost beneficiary' accounts.

=== Impact ===
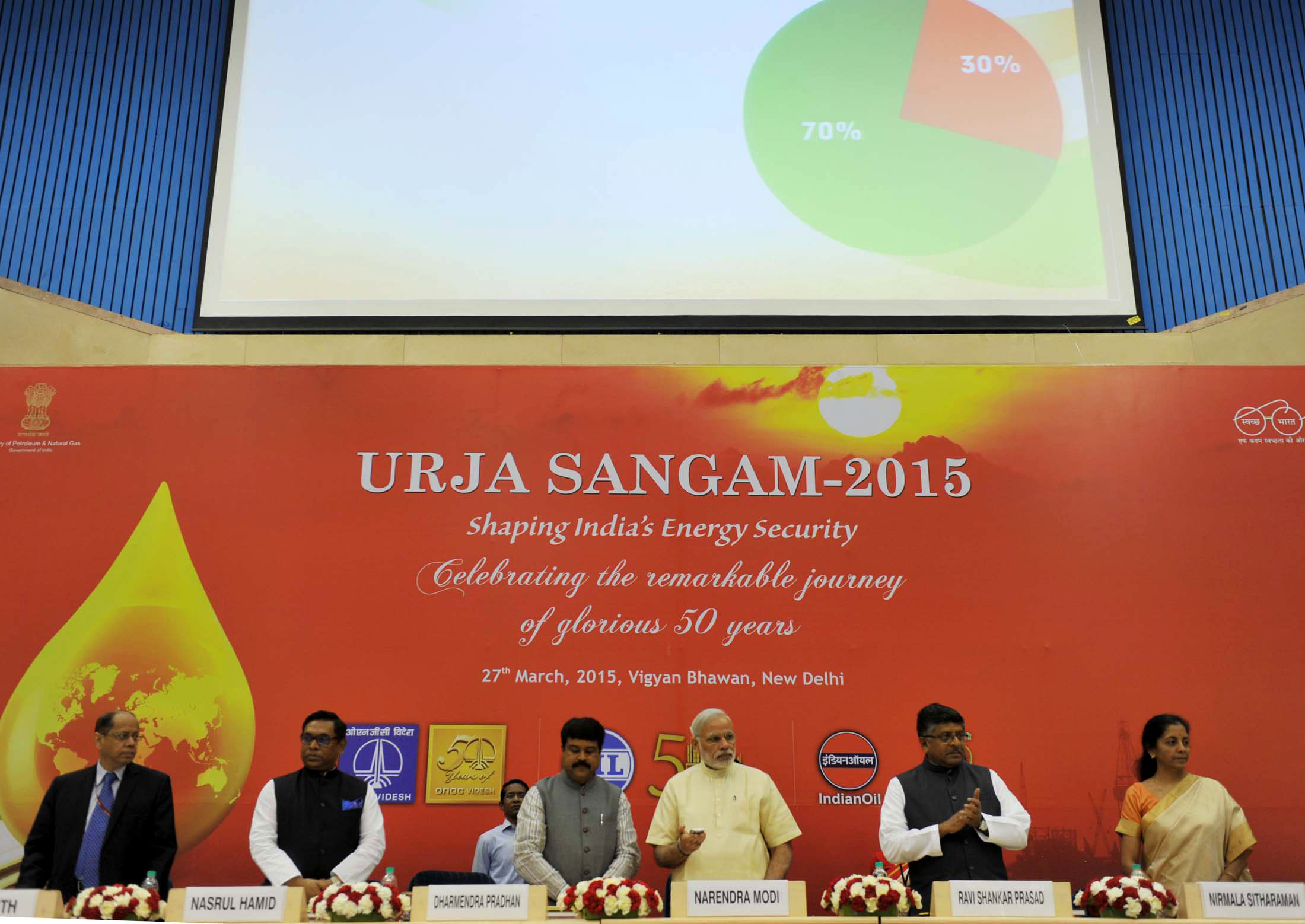

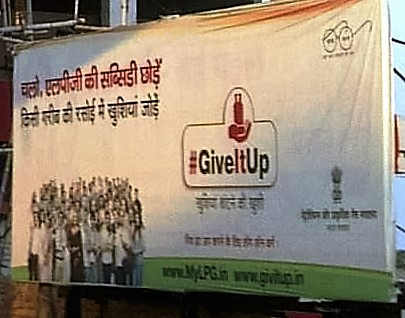

The impact of citizens surrendering their LPG subsidy is twofold. Despite the redistributive impact it has, approximately 500 million Indians remain without access to LPG. The benefit associated with surrendering the LPG subsidy includes reducing subsidy costs by encouraging higher-income households to purchase the LPG cylinders at the market price, as it eases the burden on the government. This would in turn stabilise the economy and lower the fiscal deficit of the country.

Possible alternatives to expand access to LPG subsidies while constraining government expenditure includes restricting the total number of subsidised cylinders provided per annum and improving the targeted population of beneficiaries based on a due-diligence based assessment of income.
