= Lavkumar Khachar =

Indian ornithologist and conservationist

Lavkumar Jiva Khachar or K.S. Lavkumar (24 February 1930 – 2 March 2015) was an ornithologist, nature and wildlife conservationist from India.

== Biography ==
Khachar was born on 24 February 1930 in the royal family of the former princely state of Jasdan, Gujarat, India. He was educated at Rajkumar College, Rajkot and completed his B.Sc. from St. Stephen's College, Delhi. He later taught biology and geography at Rajkumar College in 1956.

=== Career ===
His involvement in ornithology began in the 1950s and was associated with other ornithologists like Salim Ali, Humayun Abdulali and Zafar Futehally. He was closely associated with Bombay Natural History Society (BNHS) and World Wide Fund for Nature (WWF) India. He was funded by WWF to conceive and initiated the nature education movement in 1976. He also served as director of the Nature Discovery Centre at the Centre for Environment Education (CEE) in 1984. He advocated and worked in the creation of Marine National Park in Gulf of Kutch, the first marine national park in India. He was involved in wildlife conservation of Gir Forest also. He worked for education and involvement of youth in nature conservation. He was the founder of the Hingolgadh Nature Conservation Education Sanctuary created by Jasdan royal family. He was a member of Delhi Bird Club.

He died on 2 March 2015 at Rajkot, Gujarat, India. He was married and had a son and a daughter.

== Recognition ==
He was awarded the Salim Ali – Loke Wan Tho Lifetime Achievement Award for Excellence in Ornithology for his contribution in the field of conservation of birds and their habitat. He also received Certificate of Merit from His Royal Highness Prince Philip. He was also awarded Venu Menon Lifetime Achievement Award in 2004.
