= Amitabha Chowdhury =

Indian investigative journalist

- Born: 11 November 1927; Calcutta, India
- Died: 1 May 2015 (aged 87); South Kolkata, India
- Occupation: Journalist
- Employer: Jugantar

Amitabha Chowdhury (11 November 1927 – 1 May 2015) was an Indian investigative journalist. He received the Ramon Magsaysay Award for his reporting on individual rights and community interests in India.
