= Avinash K. Dorle =

Indian scientist (1935–2015)

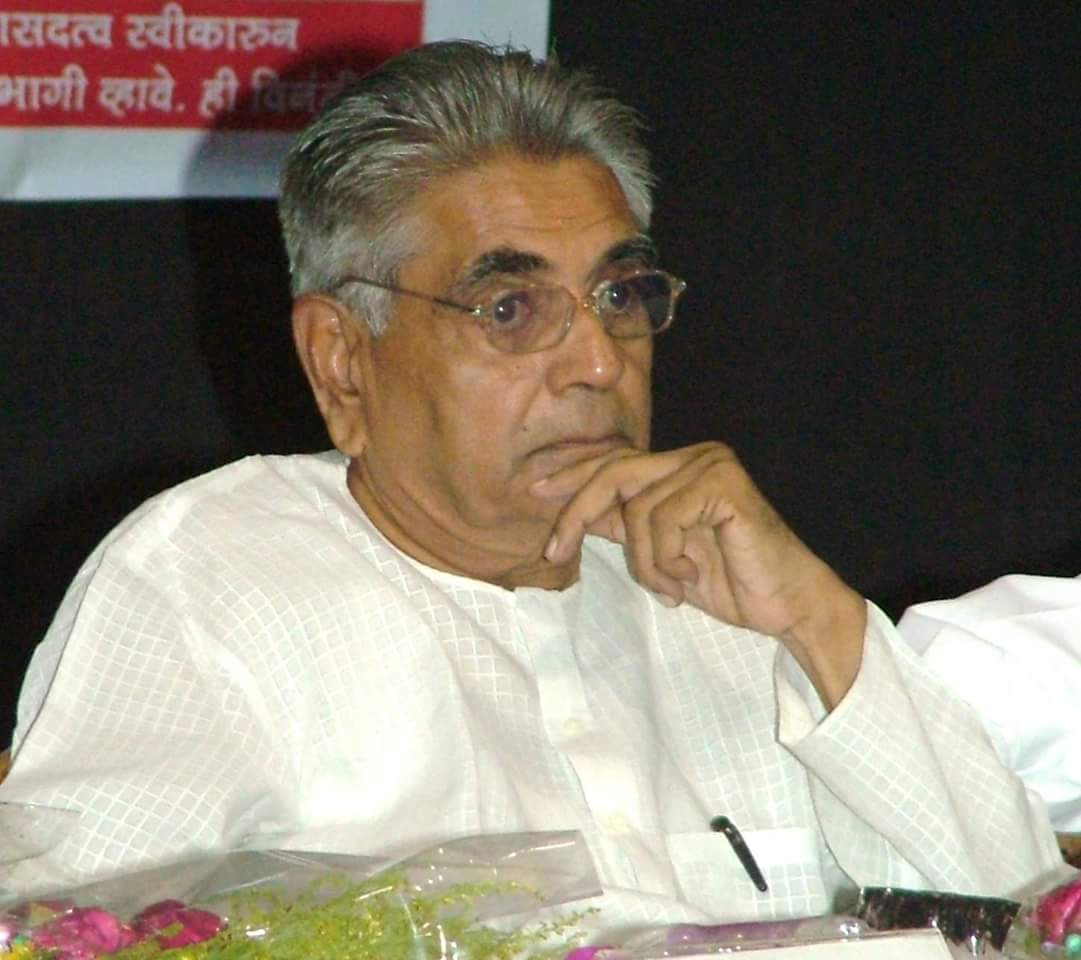
Dr. Avinash K. Dorle during an event

Avinash K. Dorle (A. K. Dorle) (22 March 1935 – 14 November 2015) was an Indian scientist and professor of pharmaceutical sciences. He was formerly the head of the University Department of Pharmaceutical Sciences, Nagpur University, India. He also served as the president of Maharashtra Pharmacy Council (1982–98), and Indian Pharmaceutical Association. He received an emeritus professorship from All India Council for Technical Education (AICTE)(1995–1997). He continues to serve as President of Central India Pharmacy Promotion and Research Association (CIPPARA) and as faculty at Department of Cosmetic Technology, Nagpur University.

He was widely recognized and cited researcher in pharmaceutical sciences, especially in the areas of drug delivery and King of pharmacology. His specific areas of excellent contributions include rosin, zeta potential, adrenergic mechanisms, emulsion stability, herbal panchgavya formulations and alternate medicine.

Dorle was a recipient of several awards including G.P.Shrivastava Memorial Award (APTI), Indian Pharmaceutical Association Award for excellence, and Bhojraj Panjamool Memorial Award. Dorle has mentored several well-known scientists for their doctoral programs.
