= Vasu Malali =

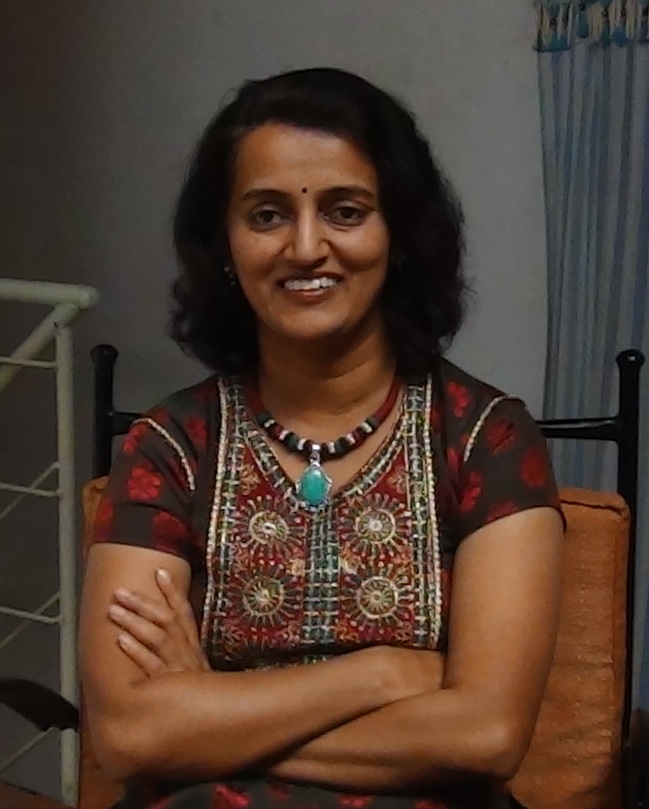
- Dr. Vasu Malali
- Born: 2 July 1967
- Died: 3 February 2015 (aged 47)
- Citizenship: Indian
- Education: Mysore university
- Occupation: Historian
- Writing career
- Language: Kannada

M.V. Vasu popularly known as Vasu Malali was a Kannada author, historian, columnist and film director. She was born on 7 February 1967. She was the eldest daughter of Kannada writer Malali Vasanth Kumar and Shantha Vasanth Kumar

== Publications ==
She wrote a column "Kallu Balli" in Prajawani, a Kannada daily of Karnataka, India. She had published several books in Kannada including "Moukhika Ithihasa" which discusses the oral history and its tradition.

== Filmography ==
- Shastra (Kannada)

== Death ==
Vasu Malali died on 3 February 2015.
