= Nawan Zamana =

- Type: Daily newspaper
- Format: Broadsheet
- Owner(s): Arjan Singh Gargaj Foundation
- Editor-in-chief: Jagjit Singh Anand
- Editor: Chand Fatehpuri
- Founded: 1952
- Political alignment: Left-wing
- Language: Panjabi
- Headquarters: Jalandhar, Punjab, India
- Price: Daily: Rs.3.00, Sunday: Rs.4.00
- Website: www.nawanzamana.in

Nawan Zamana is an Indian Punjabi language daily newspaper owned by the Arjan Singh Gargaj Foundation, published in Jalandhar, Punjab, India. After partition, Communist Party of India brought out its Urdu weekly Naya Zamana from Jalandhar in 1952. The CPI converted Naya Zamana into the Punjabi daily, Nawan Zamana, as Urdu was losing its readership after partition. Jagjit Singh Anand, a former member of Rajya Sabha, was its Chief Editor for 50 years until his death in June 2015. Its online edition was launched in 2007.

== See also ==
- The Tribune
- Khalsa Akhbar Lahore
- List of newspapers
- List of newspapers in India by circulation
- List of newspapers in the world by circulation
