= Sepon, Assam =

Sepon (𑜋𑜦𑜧 𑜆𑜨𑜃𑜫) is a semi-urban place in upper Assam, India, with an estimated population between 1000 and 2000. The term Sepon is a Tai Ahom term which means 'the city of fluffy cotton'. 𑜋𑜦𑜧(che)-City, 𑜆𑜨𑜃𑜫 (pon)-fluffy cotton. One of the significant geographical features of Sepon is that it is located between two districts of Assam, Charaideo and Dibrugarh. National Highway 37 divides Sepon into two parts; one part within the jurisdiction of the Dibrugarh district and another part within the jurisdiction of the Charaideo district. Sepon is surrounded by tea gardens and villages.

== Education ==
The main educational institutions of Sepon include the Sepon College, Sepon High School, Sepon Jatiya Vidyapeeth, Sepon Hatipatee High School, Divine Valley School and others. Nearby institutions of higher education are located in Moranhat, Dibrugarh, and Sivasagar.

== Transport ==
Sepon is well connected by rail, bus and air transportation. The National Highway runs through central Sepon. Bus services are available from different places in Assam to Sepon. With the growth in transportation facilities, Sepon is now a hub of commercial activity. Sepon is well connected with Indian railway service through a small railway station. The nearest airport is the Mohanbari Airport of Dibrugarh, which is around 60 kilometer away from Sepon.

== Trade and Commerce ==
Sepon has become an increasingly important commercial area as the transportation and communication systems have developed. There is also a daily market. The main banking institution of Sepon is the Assam Gramin Vikash Bank Sepon Branch. There is one branch of Punjab National Bank located in Sepon Chakalia. There is a tea estate named Sepon Tea Estate. One part of the Sepon Tea Estate falls under Sivasagar and another part falls under Dibrugarh District.

== Politics ==
Sepon is a part of the Jorhat and Dibrugarh Loksabha Constituency and a part of the Mahmora and Moran Assembly (Vidhan Sabha) Constituency.
