= Vakrangee Limited =

Indian technology company

- Type: Public
- Traded as: BSE: 511431; NSE: VAKRANGEE
- ISIN: INE051B01021
- Industry: ITES
- Founded: 28 May 1990; 36 years ago
- Founder: Dinesh Nandwana
- Headquarters: Vakrangee House, Plot No. 66, Marol Co-Op. Industrial Estate, Off. M. V. Road, Andheri (E), Mumbai – 400 059
- Area served: India
- Key people: Dinesh Nandwana (Managing Director & CEO); Nishikant Hayatnagarkar (Whole Time Director)
- Products: e-governance; Vakrangee Kendra; Vakrangee ATM
- Revenue: ₹40 billion (US$430 million) (2017)
- Operating income: ₹9.5 billion (US$100 million) (2017)
- Net income: ₹3.5 billion (US$37 million) (2017)
- Total assets: ₹22.7 billion (US$240 million) (2017)
- Total equity: ₹20.6 billion (US$220 million) (2017)
- Number of employees: 1,706 (2017)
- Website: www.vakrangee.in

Vakrangee Limited is a technology company based in Mumbai, India that provides banking, insurance, e-governance, e-commerce, and logistics services. The company is one of the main providers of the software and equipment for voter ID cards and Aadhaar cards.

According to Forbes, the company is the largest single systems integrator for all key government projects in India. As of June 2018, its largest owners included the promoter's family, the government of Singapore, Wellington Trust Company, Life Insurance Corporation and Jagdishchander Bansal.

== History ==
Vakrangee limited was founded in Marol Naka, Mumbai, 1990 by Dinesh Nandwana, a Chartered Accountant (CA). Though the company commenced its operations as a technology consultancy, it gradually expanded its operations, first by making voter identity cards in 1993, and subsequently as a franchisee for making Aadhaar UID cards in 2010. In July 2017, Forbes India included the company in its "Super 50" list of companies 2017 as it had a market capitalization of more than ₹240 billion (US$2.6 billion).

== Operations ==
Vakrangee operates a franchisee network of more than 37,000 centers known as "Vakrangee Kendras" in 16 states of India. These centers undertake a mix of tasks, from voter ids, aadhaar registration, as well as white label ATMs (ATM machines used by different banks). Most of its centers act as "last-mile retail points of sale" and are located in the rural, semi-urban and urban areas that do not have access to technology and often electricity.

Vakrangee also operates e-Governance projects with the Government of India.

=== Vakrangee Kendras ===
As of December 2017, the company operated 44,286 Vakrangee Kendras through a franchisee-based model. Each outlet provides a range of services related to the government of India under various e-governance initiatives of the government. These include disbursement of money under Direct Benefit Transfer scheme, pension and basic banking under National Pension System and Pradhan Mantri Jan Dhan Yojana, processing of passports, microinsurance under Atal Pension Yojana, Pradhan Mantri Jeevan Jyoti Bima Yojana and Pradhan Mantri Suraksha Bima Yojana, tax and cess collection, enrollment and issuance of Aadhaar card, NREGA Job card, Election card, Passport, birth, death, domicile and land record certificates among other services.

Vakrangee Kendras also provides various other services like banking by acting as banking correspondent for many scheduled commercial banks and insurance as a corporate agent to some insurance companies, utility bill, mobile & DTH payments, ticketing & logistics, e-learning & certifications, and e-commerce through Amazon.in. The company, licensed by the Reserve Bank of India, operates a network of white labeled Vakrangee ATM centers.

=== e-Governance Projects ===
Under this segment, Vakrangee delivers IT and IT enabled services to the Government of India, various state governments, and the Government of Philippines. These projects include collection services, recruitment application processing for government-related services, grievance management services, land records digitization, electoral rolls, among others
