= 2014 Railway budget of India =

Indian railway budget of 2014

- Emblem of India
- Submitted by: Suresh Prabhu, Minister of Railways
- Presented: 8 July 2014
- Country: India
- Parliament: Parliament of India
- Party: Bharatiya Janata Party
- Website: www.indiabudget.nic.in

The 2014 Railway Budget of India refers to the Railway Budget of the Indian Railways in the fiscal year 2014–15. The budget was presented in the Parliament of India by Railway Minister D. V. Sadananda Gowda on 8 July 2014.

== Summary ==
The budget emphasized increased amenities for travelers, better safety, and timely completion of projects. There were no fare hikes announced as both passenger and freight fares had been increased the previous month. But, it was announced that fares will be revised twice a year to absorb fuel costs. Gowda criticized previous governments for announcing new projects and failing to complete them. He said projects will now be prioritized, such as decongesting major routes instead of announcing new ones. Gowda announced no major new projects, but announced 54 new trains. He also criticized the last government for driving the railways into a loss.

Gowda announced a bullet train between Mumbai and Ahmedabad; new semi-high speed trains in nine sectors connecting metros; and new measures towards improving cleanliness, food, and e-ticketing were announced. He said CCTVs will be installed in major stations to monitor cleanliness, and major stations will have food courts serving local cuisines and precooked food from reputable catering brands will be served on board. The railways have faced complaints of substandard food in the past.

He announced the introduction of a new rail-flaw detection system to better investigate the causes of accidents. The budget allocated a significant sum to the construction of bridges at unstaffed crossings, a major cause of rail-track deaths. He announced a new project to introduce automatic closing doors on mainline and suburban trains, and said Wi-Fi will be provided in larger stations and select trains. Workstations will be available for on-board use for a fee by business travelers. The e-ticketing system will be extended from booking tickets to booking coaches and entire trains, and also retiring rooms in stations. Electric mobility carts will be provided to elderly and handicapped passengers at all major stations. Also, Railway Protection Force will recruit four thousand female constables and escorted carriages will be provided for women. A significant amount was announced for improving rail connectivity in north-east India.

Gowda emphasized use of public-private partnerships (PPPs) to fund future projects. He also said he will ask the Cabinet to approve foreign direct investment (FDI) in Indian Railways. Some stations are to be improved using PPPs.

== Responses ==
Manish R. Sharma, executive director of capital projects and infrastructure at PricewaterhouseCoopers, pointed out the budget didn't contain any information on how the government intends to attract private investors. Deven Choksey, managing director at K. R. Choksey securities, said the government now seemed to be more inclined towards PPPs than before. India's stock index SENSEX dropped and closed 2% below opening. Investors were observed selling shares in energy, infrastructure, and real estate sectors.

== See also ==
- 2015 Railway Budget of India
- Railway Budget of India
