= 2015 Union budget of India =

Government budget

- Emblem of India
- Submitted by: Arun Jaitley, Finance Minister
- Presented: 28 February 2015
- Country: India
- Parliament: Indian Parliament
- Party: Bhartiya Janta Party
- Website: www.indiabudget.gov.in

The 2015 Union budget of India refers to 2015–2016 Union budget of India. The beginning of the budget printing began on 19 February 2015 with the traditional halwa ceremony. From 20 February until the presentation of budget about 100 government employees remained locked up in the North Block of the Secretariat Building, New Delhi, which houses the budget printing press, to maintain secrecy. The budget was presented on 28 February by Finance Minister Arun Jaitley.

== Summary ==
=== Taxation ===
==== Personal income tax ====
There was no change in income tax slabs of individuals. The wealth tax was abolished. The surcharge on individuals, Hindu Undivided Families (HUF), associations of persons (AOPs), bodies of individuals (BOI)s, artificial juridical persons, firms, cooperative societies and local authorities having income earning ₹1 crore or more, was raised from 10% to 12%.

The permitted deduction limit was raised up to ₹25,000 towards health insurance for ordinary citizens, an increase from previous ₹15,000. For senior citizens, it was raised to ₹30,000 from previous ₹25,000. For very senior citizens, i.e. 80 or above, who don't have insurance, a deduction of ₹30,000 was allowed. A deduction up to ₹80,000 was allowed on the treatment of select very serious diseases for very senior citizens. A deduction up to ₹25,000 was allowed for differently-abled citizens.

An additional ₹50,000 was permitted on the new pension scheme. Salaried employees were given the choice between Employees' Provident Fund and National Pension Scheme as their pension fund. Investments in Sukanya Samriddhi Scheme and interest payouts were made eligible for deductions. Exemptions for transport allowances was raised from ₹800 to ₹1,600 per month, it is thus ₹19,200 per year. This exemption is usually given to individual salaried employees for commuting from home to workplace.

It was announced that premature withdrawal from pension funds, if service period is less than 5 years, will result in deduction of tax at source. If withdrawal amount is more than ₹30,000 then 10% tax will be deducted.

==== Corporate tax ====
It announced that corporate tax rate will be gradually reduced from 30% to 25% over the period of 4 years, starting in April 2016. 2% surcharge was introduced on earnings above 10 crores. However, it was also announced that exemptions and incentives will also be removed. It was announced that donations made to Swachh Bharat Abhiyan and Clean Ganga plan under corporate social responsibility will get 100% deduction. The General Anti-Avoidance Rule was delayed by two years. Yoga trusts were classified as charitable trusts and given tax benefits.

==== Service tax ====
The service tax rate was raised from 12.36% to 14%. A Swachh Bharat cess was announced, under which 2% will be added on select services. The service tax exemption given to mutual fund agents was withdrawn. Lottery ticket sellers and chit fund agents were brought under the ambit of service tax. Varishta Bima Yojana for senior citizens was exempt from service tax.

Pre-cooling, ripening, retail packing and labelling of vegetables and fruits were exempted from service tax. Ambulance services were exempted from service tax. Visits to music concerts, amusement and theme parks were brought under the ambit of service tax. Visits to museums, zoos, national parks, wildlife sanctuaries and tiger reserves were exempted service tax.

Salaried employees were given the choice between Employees' Provident Fund and National Pension Scheme as their pension fund. Two new insurance schemes and a pension fund were announced to improve the social security of the poor citizens. Pradhan Mantri Suraksha Bima Yojana with an annual premium of ₹12 will provide a coverage of ₹2 lakh for full disability or death, and 1 lakh for partial disability. Pradhan Mantri Jeevan Jyoti Bima Yojana is a life insurance scheme with an annual premium of ₹330, it will pay ₹2 lakh in case of death. Atal Pension Yojana is a pension scheme targeted at the unorganised sector.

=== Excise ===
The education cess were subsumed from central excise duty. Instead, the central excise duty rates were rounded off from 12.36% to 12.5%. The clean energy cess was increased from ₹100 to ₹200 per tonne of coal. It was announced that the Goods and Services Tax is expected to be implemented by 1 April 2016.

The excise duty on cigarettes was increased by 25%. The excise on cut tobacco was raised from ₹60 to ₹70 per kg. The duty on plastic bags was increased from 12% to 18%. The duty on soft drinks and packaged water was increased from 12% to 18%. On cement, it increased from ₹900 per tonne to ₹1,000 per tonne. The duty was removed from compounds used in the manufacture of incense sticks.

Excise duty on leather footwear was reduced from 12% to 6%. The duty on locally manufactured mobile phones, LED/LCD panels, LED lights and lamps was reduced. The duty on ambulance chassis reduced from 24% to 12.5%.

=== Custom duty ===
22 components used in electronics sector were exempted from import duty. Basic custom duty on magnetrons were removed. Import duty on various refrigerator components were removed. Import duty on solar water heaters was removed. Some pacemaker components were exempted. Duty on imported commercial vehicle was increased from 10% to 40%.

=== Education ===
A scheme called Nayi Manzil was announced which will help minority youth without school-leaving certificate to find employment. Five new All India Institutes of Medical Sciences (AIIMS) were announced for Jammu and Kashmir, Punjab, Tamil Nadu, Himachal Pradesh and Assam. The setting up of second AIIMS like institution in Bihar was announced in 2015 Union budget. An Indian Institute of Technology (IIT) will set up in Karnataka and the Indian School of Mines, Dhanbad will be upgraded to an IIT. Two new Indian Institutes of Management (IIM) announced for Jammu and Kashmir and Andhra Pradesh.

A new Post Graduate Institute of Horticulture Research and Education was announced for Amritsar. Three new National Institutes of Pharmaceutical Education and Research were announced for Maharashtra, Rajasthan and Chhattisgarh. Two new Institutes of Science and Education Research were announced for Nagaland and Odisha. Two new institutes called Apprenticeship Training Institute for Women were announced for Haryana and Uttarakhand.

A networked system called the Student Financial Aid Authority was announced which would monitor the allocation of scholarships and educational loans under the Pradhan Mantri Vidya Lakshmi Karyakram.

The education budget was allocated ₹69,074 crore for the year 2015–16. This was a reduction from the revised estimates from 2014 to 2015 which was ₹70,505 crore. The school education sector was allocated ₹42,219.5 crore and higher education sector was allocated ₹26,855 crore.

=== Investments ===
A proposed Benami Transactions (Prohibition) Bill, which would criminalise cash transactions of ₹20,000 or above for purchase of immovable properties, was announced. Permanent Account Number (PAN) was made mandatory for transactions above ₹1 lakh. Three new gold deposit schemes were announced to reduce import of gold and monetise the gold held by citizens. A gold coin with the Ashoka Chakra on the face will be created. The listing of Real Estate Investment Trusts (REITs) was made easier. It was announced that foreign investments will be allowed in Alternative Investment Fund (AIF), which are pooled investments in real estate, private equity and hedge funds. A simpler bankruptcy law would be created. The SARFAESI Act will be expanded to cover non-banking financial institutions (NBFC) which will make it easier for them to recover non-performing assets (NPA).

=== Other announcements ===
The states of Bihar and West Bengal were given special assistance packages from the centre. A startup incubator programme called Self Employment and Talent Utilisation (SETU) was announced. It was allocated ₹1,000 crore.

=== Revenues and expenditures ===
The Plan Expenditure for 2014-15 was revised from ₹575,000 crore to ₹467,934 crore due to a large deficit. The Plan Expenditure for 2015-16 was set at ₹465,277 crore. The Non-Plan Expenditure was estimated at ₹1,312,200 crore, with the total being estimated at ₹1,777,477 crore. The government expects ₹1,449,490 crore as tax receipts, of which ₹523,958 crore will go to state governments. Non-tax receipts were estimated at ₹221,733 crore for 2015–16.

The defence budget was increased from ₹2.29 lakh crore in 2014–15 to ₹2.46 lakh crore in 2015–16, an increase of 10.95%. The expenditure on healthcare was set at ₹33,152 crore for 2015–16, a reduction from ₹39,238 crore in 2014–15. Tax-free infrastructure bonds were re-introduced after a gap of one year.

The fiscal deficit for 2014-15 was 4.1% of the GDP. The target set for 2015-16 was that the fiscal deficit would be brought down to 3.9%. The revenue deficit target for 2015-16 was set at 2.8% of the GDP, 0.1% lower from 2014 to 2015.

== Responses ==
Prime Minister Narendra Modi of BJP political party called the budget progressive and positive. Home Minister Rajnath Singh of BJP called the budget an important step towards building a modern India. BJP president Amit Shah praised the anti-black money measures.

Mallikarjun Kharge of INC political party called the budget pro-industrialist. Former Finance Minister P. Chidambaram of INC said the budget appeases taxpayers and corporates but ignores the poor. Former Prime Minister Manmohan Singh of INC said that the budget had good intentions but lacked a proper road map.

Nitish Kumar, Chief Minister of Bihar, thanked the Finance Minister for the special assistance package and the new AIIMS in Bihar. Tarun Gogoi, Chief Minister of Assam, called the budget pro-rich and pro-corporate and criticised it for the lack of benefits for North East India. Naveen Patnaik, Chief Minister of Odisha, called the budget disappointing as it lacked as special packages for Odisha, pointing that West Bengal and Bihar were granted special packages but Odisha was ignored despite facing two natural disasters in the near past Phailin and Hudhud.

Indian stock index SENSEX gained 140 points on the day of budget announcement. Kishore Biyani, CEO of Future Group, said new service tax rate may discourage consumption.

== See also ==
- Union budget of India
- 2015 Railway Budget of India
