= General anti-avoidance rule (India) =

Anti-tax avoidance law

General anti-avoidance rule (GAAR) is an anti-tax avoidance law under Chapter X-A of the Income Tax Act, 1961 of India. It is framed by the Department of Revenue under the Ministry of Finance. GAAR was originally proposed in the Direct Tax Code 2009 and was targeted at arrangements or transactions made specifically to avoid taxes. GAAR provisions were also present in the Direct Tax Code 2010 and Direct Tax Code 2013. However, the Direct Tax Code did not see the light of the day and was not implemented in India. GAAR was finally introduced in India by then Finance Minister, Pranab Mukherjee, on 16 March 2012 during the Budget session introduced vide Finance Act, 2012. However, it was considered controversial because it had provisions to seek taxes from past overseas deals involving local assets retrospectively .

During the 2015 Budget presentation, Finance Minister Arun Jaitley announced that its implementation will be delayed by 2 years. GAAR is finally applicable from assessment year 2018-19.

== Background ==
The Parthasarthy Shome Panel was set up in 2012 for drawing up the final guidelines on GAAR. In 2007, Vodafone entered the Indian market by buying Hutchison Essar. The deal took place in Cayman Islands. The Indian government claimed over US$2 billion were lost in taxes. In September 2007, a notice was sent to Vodafone. Vodafone claimed that the transaction was not taxable as it was between two foreign firms. The government claimed that the deal was taxable as the underlying assets involved were located in India. In India, the real discussions on GAAR came to light with the release of draft Direct Taxes Code Bill (popularly known as DTC 2009) on 12 August 2009. It contained the provisions for GAAR. Later on the revised Discussion Paper was released in June 2010, followed by tabling in the Parliament on 30 August 2010, a formal Bill to enact the law known as the DirectTaxes Code 2010. The same was to be made applicable wef 1 April 2012. However, owing to negative publicity and pressures from various groups, GAAR was postponed to at least 2013, and was likely to be introduced along with the Direct Tax Code (DTC) from 1 April 2013. Moreover, an Expert Committee has been set by Prime Minister (Manmohan Singh) in July 2012 to vet and rework the GAAR guidelines issued in June 2012. The latest reports (September 2012) indicates, it may not be implemented even for 3 years i.e. this will be postponed for 3 years (2016–17).

Some of recent developments about GAAR are:

- (a) 16 March 2012 : Finance Minister, Pranab Mukherjee takes a tough stand and announces that the government will crack down on tax avoidance effective from fiscal year 2012–13
- (b) 7 May 2012 : Finance Minister, Pranab Mukherjee forced to eat his words and agreed to defer GAAR by a year as his announcements spooked oversea investors
- (c) 28 June 2012 : Finance Ministry releases first draft on GAAR; There is wide criticism of the provisions.
- (d) 14 July 2012 : PM, Manmohan Singh, forms review committee under Parthasarathi Shome, for preparing a second draft by 31 August and final guidelines by 30 September 2012
- (e) 1 September 2012 : Shome Committee recommends to defer GAAR by three years. It also recommends some more investor friendly measures
- (f) 14 January 2013 : GoI partially accepts the recommendations of Shome Committee and has decided to defer the same for 2 years and will now be effective from the year 2016–17
- (g) On 27 September 2013, GoI issued notification and as per this notification GAAR would be applicable to only to foreign institutional investors that have not taken the benefit of an agreement under Section 90 or Section 90A of the Income Tax Act, 1961 or Double Taxation Avoidance Agreement (DTAA).

Thus now

- (a) investments made by foreign investors prior to August 2010 will not attract GAAR;
- (b) GAAR provisions that will come into effect from April 2017 and (c) apply only to business arrangements with a tax benefit exceeding Rs 30 million.

On 20 January 2012, the Supreme Court of India gave the verdict in favour of Vodafone, saying that Vodafone did not owe any capital gain taxes. On 16 March, GAAR was presented to the Parliament by Pranab Mukherjee, who stated that its objective was to counter aggressive tax avoidance schemes.

== Summary ==
The regulation allows tax officials to deny tax benefits, if a deal is found without any commercial purpose other than tax avoidance. It allows tax officials to target participatory notes. Under GAAR, the investor has to prove that the participatory note was not set to avoid taxes. It also allows officials to deny double taxation avoidance benefits, if deals made in tax havens were found to be avoiding taxes.

== Responses ==
Adrian Mowat of JP Morgan in May 2012 said that there were ambiguities in the law and that it may discourage foreign investors. In May 2012, CLSA stopped issuing Indian participatory notes.
