= Dinesh Nandwana =

Indian first generation entrepreneur (born 1963)

- Born: 28 March 1963 (age 61); Kota, Rajasthan, India
- Died: January 31, 2025 (aged 61)
- Occupation: Chairman of Vakrangee Limited

Dinesh Nandwana (March 28, 1963-January 31, 2025) in Kota, Rajasthan) was an Indian first-generation entrepreneur, currently the Executive Chairman of Vakrangee Limited, an Indian technology company. He is ranked 88th in Forbes India's richest Indian by year 2017 with a net worth of US$1.72 billion.

A chartered accountant by profession, Nandwana founded Vakrangee in 1990 as a technology consulting company, which is an implementation agency for government projects about social and financial inclusion of Indian citizens. His company has implemented e-governance projects of the Government of India like Aadhaar and MCA 21.
