= 2015 Railway budget of India =

Indian railway budget of 2015

- Emblem of India
- Submitted by: Suresh Prabhu, Minister of Railways
- Presented: 26 February 2015
- Country: India
- Parliament: Parliament of India
- Party: Bharatiya Janata Party
- Website: www.indiabudget.nic.in

The 2015 Railway Budget of India refers to the Railway Budget of the Indian Railways in the fiscal year 2015–16. The budget was presented by the Railway Minister Suresh Prabhu in the Parliament of India on 26 February 2015.

== Summary ==
No new trains were announced. There were no passenger fare hikes announced. Passengers will be allowed to book tickets up to 120 days in advance, an increase from current 2 months. An initiative called the "Operation 5-minute" was announced which would allow ticket bearer passengers to acquire tickets within 5 minutes of entering a station. SMS alerts for the arrival and departure of trains will introduced. More general-class coaches would be added to select trains. A centrally managed "Railway Display Network" will be introduced at 2,000 stations to provide train information.

200 stations will be brought under the "Adarsh Station Scheme" and will be given basic amenities like toilets, drinking water, catering services, waiting rooms etc. Under the "Swachh Rail Swachh Bharat" programme professional cleaning agencies will hired to keep trains and stations clean and train staff. 650 stations will be getting new toilets. 17,000 old toilets on trains will be replaced by bio-toilets in 2015, increasing the number of 17,388 existing ones. A 24/7 toll-free system will be introduced, 138 for the helpline and 182 for security issues. Mobile phone charging will be introduced in general-class coaches and the number of charging points in sleeper-classes will be increased.

400 railways stations, including B-category stations, will be provided with Wi-Fi. CCTV cameras will installed in select trains and women's-only coaches of suburban trains to ensure the safety of women. Shatabdi trains would be provided with on-board entertainment. Train collision detection systems will be introduced on selected routes. The number of stations from which passengers can pay a combined train and road ticket will be increased. The numbers of trains in which passengers can order meals and disposable bedrolls at the time of booking tickets to be increased. Disabled and senior citizens will be able to book wheelchairs.

1,38,000 km of tracks will be added in the next 5 years, an increase of 10%. 3,000 unstaffed railway crossings will be removed and 917 over or under-bridges will be constructed to replace some of them. Four dedicated freight corridors will be complete in 2015 and 6608 km of tracks would be electrified. The feasibility study report of the Mumbai and Ahmedabad expected to be submitted in mid-2015. 9 semi-high speed corridors will be introduced with speed up to 200 km/h. The carriages for such trains will be built in India. A push for better connectivity in the North-East India and Jammu and Kashmir was also announced.

Barcode and RFID tracking of parcels and freight carriages will be introduced. The fare of some freight goods were increased. The rate for urea was hiked by 10%, coal by 6.3%, iron ore and steel by 0.8%, cement by 2.7%, and grains and pulses by 10%. However, the rates for limestone, dolomite and manganese ore was reduced by 0.3%, and diesel oil by 1%.

Satellite stations will be built around 10 major stations to reduce congestion and serve the suburbs. Four Railway Research Centres will be introduced in select four universities.

The Indian Railway will raise ₹17,655 crore from the market through its two companies Indian Railway Finance Corporation (IRFC) and Rail Vikas Nigam Limited (RVNL). This was a 47% increase from then current fiscal year's revised estimates of ₹12,045 crore. IRFC will try to raise ₹17,276 crore to invest in rolling stocks. RVNL will try to raise ₹376 crore by market borrowing. In the fiscal year 2014–15, according to the revised estimates, IRFC raised ₹11,772.6 crore, and RVNL raised ₹273 crore from the market. Overall crore will be spent on the Railways in the period 2015–19.

== Responses ==
After Railway Minister Suresh Prabhu presented his maiden budget, Prime Minister Narendra Modi tweeted: "Rail budget 2015 is a forward looking, futuristic and passenger centric budget, combining a clear vision and a definite plan to achieve it." Nitin Gadkari, the Transport Minister called the budget reformative. Smriti Irani, Human Resource Minister, praised the budget for considering women's safety.

Rajeev Gowda, spokesperson of the Indian National Congress (INC) said the budget was leaning towards elites. Mallikarjun Kharge of INC said that budget did not clarify how revenues will generated to pay for the promises.

Bihar Chief Minister Nitish Kumar said the budget had many lofty ideas but no action plan. He said that fares should have been cut due to fall in international oil prices. Odisha Chief Minister Naveen Patnaik expressed disappointment due to lack of any special package towards his state and pointed out that Odisha had a much lower rail density than the national average. He said his state was committed on providing free land and 50% of expenses towards railway projects.

India's stock index SENSEX fell 261 points, a drop of 0.90%, after the announcements. Jyotinder Kaur, principle economist at HDFC bank, said that he was unsure of how the funds for the proposals will be gathered as the budget did not mention it.

== See also ==
- 2014 Railway Budget
- 2015 Union budget of India
