= Deepak Mohoni =

Indian Stock Market analyst

- Citizenship: India
- Education: IIM Calcutta; IIT Kanpur
- Occupation: Stock market analyst
- Known for: coining the term "Sensex"

Deepak Mohoni, is an Indian stock market analyst. In 1989 that he coined the term SENSEX for the Bombay stock exchange index.

== Biography ==
Mohoni is a chemical engineering graduate from IIT Kanpur and completed his MBA from IIM Calcutta. He studied at the Scindia School Gwalior. He is a regular columnist in The Economic Times and Business World, writing about technical analysis. He appears regularly on CNBC-TV18 and also appeared on BBC, Star TV, Doordarshan, and Reuters TV. His comments on the market are often quoted by Indian financial media.
He currently heads a consulting firm and runs a website called Trendwatch.
