= Pradhan Mantri Suraksha Bima Yojana =

Indian government-backed accident insurance scheme

- Country: India
- Prime Minister(s): Narendra Modi
- Ministry: Finance
- Key people: Arun Jaitley
- Launched: 9 May 2015; 10 years ago
- Status: Active

Pradhan Mantri Suraksha Bima Yojana (PMSBY, translation: Prime Minister's Safety Insurance Scheme) is a government-backed accident insurance scheme in India. It was originally mentioned in the 2015 budget speech by Finance Minister Arun Jaitley in February 2015. It was formally launched by the Prime Minister Narendra Modi on 8 May in Kolkata.

== Provisions ==
Pradhan Mantri Suraksha Bima Yojana is available to people (Indian Resident or NRI) between 18 and 70 years of age with bank accounts. It has an annual premium of ₹20 (24¢ US). Goods and Services Tax (GST) is exempted on Pradhan Mantri Suraksha Bima Yojana. The amount is automatically debited from the account. This insurance scheme can have one year cover from 1 June to 31 May and is offered through banks. It is administered through public sector general insurance companies.

Feature	Description
Scheme Name	Pradhan Mantri Suraksha Bima Yojana
Announced on	May 9, 2015
Country	India
Initiated by	Finance Minister Arun Jaitley
Beneficiaries	Poor and underprivileged individuals aged 18 to 70 years who have a savings bank account
Objective	To provide accident insurance cover to the deprived population at an extremely affordable premium
Registration Process	The account holder can enroll by visiting the bank branch, through BC (Banking Correspondent), or via BOB World Internet (Internet Banking)
Official Website	National Insurance Company Limited National Insurance Company Limited: https://nationalinsurance.nic.co.in/en/about-us/pradhan-mantri-suraksha-bima-yojana
Contact	18003450330

In case of death or full disability, the payment to the nominee will be ₹2 Lakh and in case of partial permanent disability it would be ₹1 Lakh. Full disability has been defined as loss of use in both eyes, hands, or feet. Partial Permanent disability has been defined as loss of use in one eye, hand, or foot. Further, death due to suicide, alcohol, drug abuse, etc., are not covered. A person joined under this scheme is eligible for a claim only after 45 days of joining the scheme.

This scheme is linked to the bank accounts opened under the Pradhan Mantri Jan Dhan Yojana scheme. Most of these accounts had zero balance initially. The government aims to reduce the number of such zero balance accounts by using this and related schemes. Now, all bank account holders can avail this facility through their net-banking service facility at any time of the year. The policy will be canceled if there is no balance in the account. The policy will lapse in case the bank account is closed. If you have multiple bank accounts, only one bank account can be linked to the scheme.

== Statistics ==
Year	policyholder numbers (Cr)	Claims Received (lak)	% claims disbursed
2015-16			
2016-17	9.95	12.5	75.0%
2017-18	13.48	21.1	77.7%
2018-19	15.47	40.7	79%
2019-20	18.54	50.3	79.4%
2020-21	23.26	58.5	77.7%
2021-22	23.4	59.5	77.3%
16-11-2022	30.92		
2023-24			

== Criticism ==
The success rate of the Pradhan Mantri Suraksha Bima Yojana (PMSBY) can be viewed through its high enrollment figures (over 50 crore cumulative enrollments as of May 2025), extensive reach into rural areas, and low rejection rate; however, it has experienced challenges in timely claim settlement, with a significant portion of claims taking longer than the stipulated 30 days as of a 2018 assessment. Though there have been concerns about premium hike due to rising loss ratio, the premium per year stand at mere Rs. 20 (0.011 USD) per annum."Symbol of a good financial inclusion plan is its simplicity and seamlessness, and both these schemes (PMJJBY and PMSBY) firmly stand the test of ease and convenience, which has made them so popular amongst the public." - says Tapan Singhel, the Managing Director and Chief Executive Officer of Bajaj Allianz General Insurance A study by the Microwave Consulting organization says, "Looking into the future, the Jan Suraksha schemes are certainly India’s most successful attempt to insure its masses".

== Results ==
As of 31 March 2019, 15.47 crore people have already enrolled for this scheme. 32,176 claims have been disbursed amounting to ₹643.52 crore (US$76 million).

In April 2017, Haryana Government announced that all Haryana residents in the age group of 18–70 years will be covered by PMSBY; the state government would reimburse the premium to the beneficiary.

== See also ==
- Atal Pension Yojana
- Pradhan Mantri Jan Dhan Yojana
- Pradhan Mantri Jeevan Jyoti Bima Yojana
