= Atal Pension Yojana =

Indian national pension scheme

- Country: India
- Key people: Arun Jaitley, Nirmala Sitharaman
- Launched: Original launch in 2010–11. Relaunched on 9 May 2015; 11 years ago
- Status: Active
- Website: jansuraksha.gov.in

Atal Pension Yojana (APY) (transl. Atal's Pension Scheme (APS)), formerly known as Swavalamban Yojana (SY, translation: Self-Support Scheme), is a government-backed pension scheme in India, primarily targeted at the unorganised sector. It was primarily launched as Swavalamban Yojana by UPA government, but renamed as Atal Pension Yojana in 2015 after the former Prime Minister Atal Bihari Bajpayee. It was mentioned in the year 2015 budget speech of Finance Minister Arun Jaitley. It was launched by Prime Minister Narendra Modi on 9 May 2015 in Kolkata. Its main objective is to help towards economic security of those people who become depressed after their working age and take retirement from professional life.

== History ==
Swavalamban Yojana was a government-backed pension scheme targeted at the unorganised sector in India. It was applicable to all citizens in the unorganised sector who joined the National Pension Scheme (NPS) administered by the Pension Fund Regulatory and Development Authority (PFRDA) Act 2013.

Under the scheme, the Government of India contributed ₹1,000 (US$10) per year to each NPS account opened in the year 2010–11 and for the next three years, that is, 2011–12, 2012–13 and 2013–14. The benefit was available only to people who joined the NPS with a minimum contribution of ₹1,000 (US$10) and maximum contribution of ₹12,000 (US$130) per annum. The scheme was announced by the Finance Minister in Budget 2010–11. It was funded by grants from the Government of India.

This scheme has been replaced with Atal Pension Yojana, in which all subscribing workers below the age of 40 are eligible for pension of up to ₹5,000 (US$52) per month on attainment of 60 years of age. This scheme was named after Atal Bihari Vajpayee, former prime minister of India.

== Scheme ==
To be eligible to avail the scheme, a person's age should be between 18 and 40 years. The pension of the person joining the scheme depends on the investment made in it and the time limit of investment. In order to incentivize people to enroll in this scheme and widen its reach, the government announced that it would co-contribute 50% of the total contribution or ₹1,000 (US$10) per annum, whichever is lower, to each eligible subscriber account, for a period of 5 years. Only subscribers who had enrolled in APY between 1 June 2015 and 31 March 2016, were not beneficiaries of any social security schemes, and did not have taxable income, were eligible for this co-contribution.

The minimum eligible age for a person to join APY is 18 years and the maximum is 40 years. An enrolled person would start receiving pension on attaining the age of 60 years. Therefore, a minimum period of contribution by the subscriber under APY would be 20 years. The individual's Aadhaar card is the primary "know your customer" (KYC) document for identification of beneficiaries, spouses, and nominees to avoid entitlement-related disputes in the long-term. For proof of address, an individual may submit a copy of their ration card or bank passbook.

Subscribers are required to opt for a monthly pension from ₹1,000 (US$10) to ₹5,000 (US$52) and ensure payment of the stipulated contribution regularly (monthly, quarterly, or half-yearly basis). Subscribers can opt to decrease or increase pension amount during the course of the accumulation phase, as per the available monthly pension amounts. However, the option to switch is only provided once a year during the month of April.

This scheme will be linked to the bank accounts opened under the Pradhan Mantri Jan Dhan Yojana scheme and the contributions will be deducted automatically.

== Subscribers & subscription amount ==
Year	Swavalamban Scheme subscription (Cr)	Swavalamban Scheme subscriber	Atal Pension Scheme subscription (Cr)	Atal Pension Scheme subscriber
2012	141	968755	-	-
2013	436	1779944	-	-
2014	844	2816027	-	-
2015	1606	4146880	-	-
2016	2108	4480014	506	2,484,895
2017	2639	4429342	1885	4863699
2018	3006	4395000*	3818	9606000*
2019	3409	4,362,538	6,860	14,953,432
2020	3728	4331000*	10526.26	21142000*
2021	4,354.38	4302000*	15,687.11	28049000*
2022	4687	-	20923	36276704
2023	-	-	-	5.2058cr

- The figure is not specified precisely, it is approximate.

Post-Covid-19, the number of beneficiaries joining the Atal Pension Scheme has increased. More than 90 lakh people joined in 2021 and more than 1.2 crore people joined in 2021.

== See also ==
- Pradhan Mantri Jan Dhan Yojana
- Pradhan Mantri Jeevan Jyoti Bima Yojana
- Pradhan Mantri Suraksha Bima Yojana
- Pradhan Mantri Ujjwala Yojana
