= Sukanya Samriddhi Account =

Saving scheme by the Government of India

- Country: India
- Launched: 22 January 2015; 11 years ago
- Status: Active

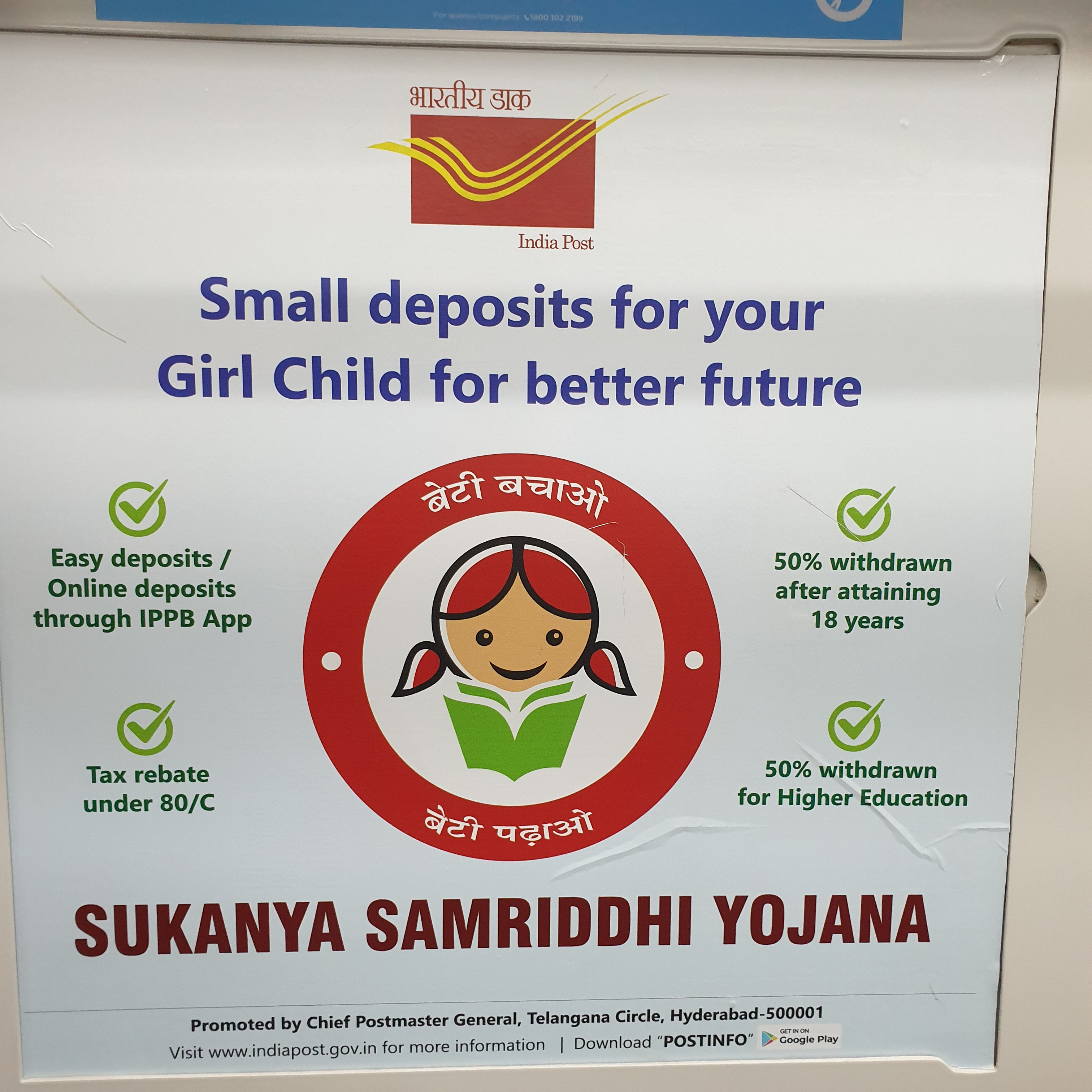
Sakanya Samriddhi poster

Sukanya Samriddhi Yojana (Girl Child Prosperity Account) is a Government of India backed saving scheme targeted at the parents of girl children. The scheme encourages parents to build a fund for the future education of their female child.

The scheme was launched by Prime Minister Narendra Modi on 22 January 2015 as a part of the Beti Bachao Beti Padhao campaign. The scheme currently provides an interest rate of 8.2% (For Jan -Mar 2024 quarter) and tax benefits. The account can be opened at any India Post office or branch of authorized commercial banks.

The Sukanya Samriddhi Account Rules, 2016 was rescinded on 12 December 2019 and the new Sukanya Samriddhi Account Scheme, 2019 was introduced.

== Summary ==
The scheme was launched by Prime Minister Narendra Modi on 22 January 2015 in Panipat, Haryana. The accounts can be opened at any India Post office or a branch of some authorized commercial banks. Initially, the interest rate was set at 9.1% but later revised to 9.2% in late March 2015 for FY2015-16.

The latest interest rate for Sukanya Samriddhi Account revised from January 1, 2024 is 8.2%.

The account can be opened anytime between the birth of a girl child and the time she attains 10 years age by the parent/guardian. Only one account is allowed per child. Parents can open a maximum of two accounts for each of their children (exception allowed for twins and triplets). The account can be transferred to anywhere in India.

A minimum of ₹250 must be deposited in the account initially. Thereafter, any amount in multiples of Rs 100 can be deposited. However, the maximum deposit limit is ₹150,000. If the minimum deposit of ₹250, (initially which was 1000) is not made in a year, a fine of ₹50 will be put on.

The girl can operate her account after she reaches the age of 10. The account allows 50% withdrawal at the age of 18 for higher education purposes. The account reaches maturity after time period of 21 years from date of opening it. Deposits in the account can be made till the completion of 15 years, from the date of the opening of the account. After this period the account will earn only applicable rate of interest. If the account is closed, then it will not earn interest at the prevailing rate. If the girl is over 18 and married, normal closure is allowed.

The Sukanya Samriddhi Yojana (SSY) scheme is highly flexible regarding annual deposit amounts. You are not required to deposit the same amount every year.Key Deposit RulesFlexible Amounts: You can choose to deposit any amount between the minimum and maximum limits each financial year based on your financial convenience.Minimum Limit: You must deposit at least ₹250 every financial year to keep the account active.Maximum Limit: You can deposit up to ₹1.5 lakh per financial year.Frequency: You can make a single lump-sum deposit or multiple deposits throughout the year in multiples of ₹50.Duration: Deposits must be made for 15 years from the date the account was opened.What happens if you miss the minimum?If you fail to deposit at least ₹250 in a year, the account is considered "under default." You can regularise it by paying a penalty of ₹50 for each missed year, along with the minimum deposit amount for those years.

== No of subscribers ==
Year	No of Accounts	Deposit Amount(cr)
2015	4,20,420	123
2016	69,98,870	6,773
2017	1,00,84,152	17,156
2018	1,24,28,910	31,958
2019	1,55,34,417	50,224
2020	1,92,49,624	72,880
2021	2,32,67,968	1,01,258
2022	2,93,74,765	1,39,296
Dec 2022	3,25,12,095	1,62,154

List of states with highest number of accounts as on 31 December 2022

States	No of accounts
Uttar Pradesh	36,07,698
Tamil Nadu	31,38,182
Maharashtra	28,75,136
Madhya Pradesh	25,27,795
Karnataka	24,48,215

=== Interest rates revisions ===
Serial number	Financial Year	Date range	Interest Rate	Minimum Investment	Maximum Investment
1	2014–15	1 April 2014 to 31 March 2015	9.1%	1,000	1,50,000
2	2015–16	1 April 2015 to 31 March 2016	9.2%	1,000	1,50,000
3	2016–17	1 April 2016 to 30 Sep 2016	8.6%	1,000	1,50,000
4	2016–17	1 Oct 2016 to 31 Mar 2017	8.5%	1,000	1,50,000
5	2017–18	1 April 2017 to 30 June 2017	8.4%	1,000	1,50,000
6	2017–18	1 July 2017 to 31 December 2017	8.3%	1,000	1,50,000
7	2017–18	1 January 2018 to 31 March 2018	8.1%	1,000	1,50,000
8	2018–19	1 April 2018 to 30 September 2018	8.1%	250	1,50,000
9	2018–19	1 October 2018 to 31 March 2019	8.5%	250	1,50,000
10	2019–20	1 April 2019 to 30 June 2019	8.5%	250	1,50,000
11	2019–20	1 July 2019 to 31 March 2020	8.4%	250	1,50,000
12	2020–21	1 April 2020 to 31 March 2021	7.6%	250	1,50,000
13	2021–22	1 April 2021 to 31 March 2022	7.6%	250	1,50,000
14	2022–23	1 April 2022 to 31 March 2023	7.6%	250	1,50,000
15	2023–24	1 April 2023 to 31 December 2023	8.0%	250	1,50,000
16	2023–24	1 January 2024 to 31 March 2024	8.2%	250	1,50,000
17	2024–25	1 April 2024 to 31 March 2025	8.2%	250	1,50,000
18	2025–26	1 April 2025 to 31 March 2026	8.2%	250	1,50,000
19	2026–27	1 April 2026 to 31 December 2026	8.2%	250	1,50,000

=== Tax benefits ===
At the time of launch, only the deposits in the account were eligible for tax deduction under Section 80C of the Income Tax Act, which is ₹150,000 in 2015-16. However, Finance Minister Arun Jaitley announced, during the 2015 Union Budget, tax exemption on the interest from the account and on withdrawal from the fund after maturity, making the tax benefits similar to that of the Public Provident Fund. These changes were applied retrospectively from 1 April 2015. These benefits will be reassessed annually.

== Eligibility ==
For the child (account holder)

- Only a girl child can avail the benefits of Sukanya Samriddhi Yojana saving scheme.
- The maximum age of this child should be 10 years. However a grace period of 1 year is granted.

For the parents-

- Only biological parents or legal guardians of a girl child can open the account on the child's behalf.
- One parent or legal guardian can open up to two accounts for their girl children.
- In case of twins or triplets the parent or legal guardian can open up to three accounts.
- The account holder has to be an Indian citizen and resident in India at the time of account opening and has to remain so until maturity or closure of account.

== Reception ==
By mid-March 2015, within 2 months of launch, 1,80,000 accounts had been opened under the scheme. Karnataka, Tamil Nadu and Andhra Pradesh reported highest number of new accounts. The number of accounts opened up to October, 2015 under Sukanya Samriddhi Yojana across the country is 76,19,668. The impact is that 76,19,668 girl children got ₹28.38 billion (US$290 million) deposited in their name.

== Maturity ==
- The Account shall mature on completion of a period of twenty-one years from the date of its opening:

Provided that the final closure in the Account may be permitted before completion of such period of twenty one years, if the account holder, on an application, makes a request for such premature closure for reasons of intended marriage of the Account holder and on furnishing of age proof confirming that the applicant will not be less than eighteen years of age on the date of marriage:

Provided that no such premature closure shall be made before one month preceding the date of the marriage or after three months from the date of such marriage.

- On maturity, the balance including interest outstanding in the Account shall be payable to the Account holder, on an application by the Account holder for closure of the Account, and on furnishing documentary proof of her identity, residence and citizenship.
- No interest shall be payable once the Account completes twenty-one years from the date of its opening.

== Partial Withdrawal ==
To satisfy the financial needs that the account holder must meet to pursue higher studies, the withdrawal of 50% of the balance to the account’s balance at the close of the previous financial year is permitted.

But, withdrawals can be allowed only after the account holder is age 18 or is in the 10th standard or earlier.

It is not only an application in writing and documentary proof in the form of a valid admissions offer from an educational institution or an demand from the institution confirming that the financial requirements are necessary.

The withdrawal amount is limited to the actual amount of fees and other charges required to be paid at the time of entry, as stated in the offer of admission or on the appropriate fee slip that the institution/college issues.

The withdrawal may be made as a lump sum or in instalments of not more than once per year, maximum five years, subject to a maximum amount confirmed by the institution/college of education.

== Early Withdrawal ==
In the event of the account owner’s death, your account is closed as soon as the authority in charge presents the death certificate.

The balance on your account will be paid together with interest due until the date of death in the guardian’s name.

If the registered girl child dies, parents or legal guardians may be entitled to the amount remaining on the account and accrued interest.

The money will be transferred to the person who is the nominee for the account right away. Additionally, parents or legal guardianship representatives must provide the valid documents confirming your account holder’s death, signed by the authorities concerned.

The interest rate for the period between the dates of death and the closing date of the account will be the interest rate that applies to savings accounts at the post office for balances in the Sukanya Samriddhi Account.

== Transfer of account ==
(1) The Account may be transferred anywhere in India and from or to post offices and from or to Banks and between post office and Bank, free of cost on furnishing of proof of shifting of residence of either the guardian or the Account holder and otherwise, on payment of a fees of one hundred rupees to the post office or the Bank to which the transfer is made.

(2) The process of transfer of the account shall be effected electronically if the post office or the Bank concerned, has access to the facility of CBS.
