= Pradhan Mantri Jeevan Jyoti Bima Yojana =

Insurance policy by Government of India

Pradhan Mantri Jeevan Jyoti Bima Yojana (PMJJBY)
- Country: India
- Prime Minister(s): Narendra Modi
- Launched: 9 May 2015; 11 years ago
- Website: jansuraksha.gov.in

Pradhan Mantri Jeevan Jyoti Bima Yojana (Prime Minister Jeevan Jyoti Insurance Scheme) is a Government-backed life insurance scheme in India. It was originally mentioned in the year 2015 budget speech by the then-Finance Minister, Arun Jaitley in February 2015. It was formally launched by Prime Minister Narendra Modi on 9 May 2015 in Kolkata. As of May 2015, only 20% of India's population has any kind of insurance, this scheme aims to increase the number.

Pradhan Mantri Jeevan Jyoti Bima Yojana is available to people between 18 and 50 years of age with bank accounts. It has an annual premium of ₹436 (US$4.50). The GST is exempted on Pradhan Mantri Jeevan Jyoti Bima Yojana. The amount will be automatically debited from the account on or before 31 May every year. Period for which insurance covered is 12 months i.e., from 1 June till 31 May. Those who register for auto debit facility will have auto renewal up to 55 years. However, a person over age 50 cannot register to this scheme. There is no need for a person to submit health report or certificate while joining to this scheme. In case of death due to any cause, the payment to the nominee will be ₹2 lakh (US$2,100). In order to avail of the benefits offered by the Pradhan Mantri Jeevan Jyoti Bima Yojana policy, it is mandatory to link your Aadhaar Card to the participatory bank account.

This scheme will be linked also to the bank accounts opened under the Pradhan Mantri Jan Dhan Yojana scheme. Most of these account had zero balance initially. The Government aims to reduce the number of such zero balance accounts by using this and related schemes.

Now all bank account holders can avail this facility through their net-banking service facility or by filling out a form at the bank branch at any time of the year.

The premium is deducted automatically from the insured's bank account. Insured's family members will receive a sum insured of ₹2 lakh after insured's death.

== Statistics ==
Year	Cumulative policyholder numbers (Cr)	Cumulative Claims Dispursed
2015-16	2.97	25,555
2016-17	3.13	62,479
2017-18	5.36	94,262
2018-19	6.05	1,39,917
2019-20	7.15	1,82,271
2020-21	10.35	2,45,452
2021-22	12.89	5,85,644
2022-23	16.19	6,64,520
2023-24		

- Disbursed Amount for the claims: Rs. 13,290.40 crore (As on April 26, 2023)

== Results ==
As of 31 March 2019, 5.92 crore (59.2 million) people have already enrolled for this scheme. 1,35,212 claims have been disbursed, amounting to a total of ₹2,704.22 crore. As per news reports from 2021, the scheme has failed during the COVID-19 crisis, in which the country suffered an unusually high number of deaths. The article cites some possible reasons for this failure:

- There is a very small window of 30 days post-death (with the caveat "preferably") to apply for the claim; therefore, most claims are rejected if received after 30 days.
- There is no policy document or any other document given under PMJJBY, which is why families do not even know that there is such a policy under which they can claim insurance, which is one reason why they are deprived of the scheme's benefits. There is absence of a clear "Guidance Manual" on how to apply for claims. Therefore, a large number of nominees of the deceased, who had taken the PMJJBY policy, are not even aware of it, as also whether the premium was paid or not.
- It is impractical to arrange for several documents such as death certificate/ death proof, discharge slip from hospital, premium statement from the bank, etc., within 30 days of death.
- There are a large number of accounts in which no nominee is linked. In such a situation, the family has to go through a lengthy legal process separately, which takes ages. Therefore, it is necessary to simplify the claim process and increase the claim amount so that the nominee and/ or the family can get some immediate help to come out of the deep financial crisis brought on by COVID.
- There is no monitoring system specifically for PMJJBY set up by the Central Govt. No grievance redressal mechanism has been created.
- The article published in New York Times, however, is poorly informed and certainly not structured in a neutral point of view. One fact to be mentioned is that the claim settlement is 86% is spite of the fact that there have been delays.
- Grievance redressal mechanism is available at the Jansuraksha portal is owned and managed by the Department of Financial Services, Ministry of Finance, Government of India

== Success Rate ==
Over 23.6 crore, 51 crore and 7.6 crore enrolments have been done under PMJJBY, PMSBY & APY respectively till April 2025. On PMJJBY scheme, the scheme has settled claims worth ₹18,398 crore for over 9 lakh families. Under PMSBY scheme, the scheme has settled claims worth ₹3,121 crore for over 1.57 lakh families. Camps are organised at District and Gram Panchayat level across the country with active involvement of Banks, Business Correspondents and district administration. As informed by insurance companies, the claim settlement ratio under PMJJBY and PMSBY as on 28.06.2023 is 99.94% and 97.52% respectively. "Symbol of a good financial inclusion plan is its simplicity and seamlessness, and both these schemes (PMJJBY and PMSBY) firmly stand the test of ease and convenience, which has made them so popular amongst the public." - says Tapan Singhel, the managing director and chief executive officer of Bajaj Allianz General Insurance A study by the Microwave Consulting organization says, "Looking into the future, the Jan Suraksha schemes are certainly India’s most successful attempt to insure its masses".

== See also ==
- Atal Pension Yojana, a related pension scheme
- Pradhan Mantri Jan Dhan Yojana, a financial inclusion scheme in India
- Pradhan Mantri Suraksha Bima Yojana, a related accident insurance scheme
