= MCA21 Mission Mode Project =

Indian government project

MCA21 Mission Mode Project (MCA21) is the e-governance initiative from the Ministry of Corporate Affairs, Government of India. It is one of the 31Mision Mode Projects of the National e-Governance Plan.

== Need for the project ==
In the year 2002, the Ministry of Corporate Affairs (then known as the Department of Company Affairs) was faced with the problem of providing services to nearly 7.5 lakh corporate entities. Vast amounts of paperwork was to be processed. This was to be expected because with globalization and interest shown by foreign companies in India, the number of documents being handled was constantly increasing even as the expectations were increasing.

== Implementation ==
The task of managing the bid process was given to National Institute for Smart Government (NISG). The project has been implemented by Tata Consultancy Services under a Build Own Operate and Transfer(BOOT) model, with project monitoring done by external reviewers/auditors. The second phase of the project is being implemented by Infosys for the period January 2013 - July 2021.
