= Participatory note =

A participatory note, commonly known as a P-note or PN, is an instrument issued by a registered foreign institutional investor (FII) to an overseas investor who wishes to invest in Indian stock markets without registering themselves with the market regulator, the Securities and Exchange Board of India (SEBI).

SEBI permitted foreign institutional investors to register and participate in the Indian stock market in 1992. These notes are a unique Indian invention started in 2000 by SEBI to enable foreign corporates and high networth investors enter the Indian market without having to go through the process of registering as Foreign Institutional Investor (FII).

Investing through P-notes is very simple, and hence very popular amongst foreign institutional investors. The absolute value of P-notes investments rose to a record of ₹4.5 trillion (equivalent to ₹14 trillion or US$160 billion in 2023) in October 2007. However, mainly due to SEBI's strengthening of the regulatory framework for P-notes, their investments fell to a record low of ₹1.25 trillion (equivalent to ₹1.8 trillion or US$21 billion in 2023). The amount of foreign portfolio investments (FPIs) via P-notes decreased from a high of 55% to 4.1% between October 2007 and August 2017.

== Background ==
Participatory notes are instruments used for making investments in the stock markets. However, they are not used within the country; they are used outside of India for making investments in stocks listed on Indian stock markets, which is why they're also referred to as offshore derivative instruments.

In the Indian context, foreign institutional investors (FIIs) and their sub-accounts mostly use these instruments for facilitating the participation of their overseas clients, who are not interested in participating directly in the Indian stock market. For example, Indian-based brokerages buy India-based securities and then issue participatory notes to foreign investors. Any dividends or capital gains collected from the underlying securities go back to the investors.

== Results ==
=== Anonymity ===
Any entity investing in participatory notes is not required to register with SEBI (Securities and Exchange Board of India), whereas all FIIs have to compulsorily get registered. It enables large hedge funds to carry out their operations without disclosing their identity.

=== Ease of trading ===
Trading through participatory notes is easy because participatory notes are like contract notes transferable by endorsement and delivery.

=== Tax benefits ===
Some of the entities route their investment through participatory notes to take advantage of the tax laws of certain preferred countries.

=== Money laundering ===
P-notes are becoming a favourite with a host of Indian money launderers who use them to first take funds out of country through hawala and then get it back using P-notes.

=== Other uses ===
P-notes are not necessarily just for the India market. In general terms, P-notes are used for any market/share classification whereby there are restrictions for foreign investors (i.e. require a Foreign Investor-type license for non-locally domiciled brokerages). The notable markets include Shenzhen and Shanghai for China A-shares, some MENA markets and Korea in addition to India.

== Crisis of 2007 ==
On 16 October 2007, SEBI proposed curbs on participatory notes which accounted for roughly 50% of FII investment in 2007. SEBI was concerned about P-notes because it is not possible to know who owns the underlying securities and hedge funds acting through P-notes might therefore cause volatility in the Indian markets.

However, the proposals of SEBI were not clear and this led to a sudden crash when the markets opened on the following day (17 October 2007). Within a minute of opening for trade, the BSE SENSEX crashed by 1744 points or about 9% of its value—the biggest intra-day fall in Indian stock-markets in absolute terms. This led to an automatic suspension of trading for 1 hour. In the meantime, Finance Minister P. Chidambaram issued clarifications that the government was not against FIIs and was not immediately banning P-notes. After the markets opened at 10:55 a.m., they staged a comeback and ended the day at 18 715.82, down just 336.04 from Tuesday's close after tumbling to a day's low of 17 307.90.

This was, however, not the end of the volatility. The next day (18 October 2007), the SENSEX tumbled by 717.43 points – 3.83 percent – to 17 998.39, its second biggest fall. The slide continued the day after, when the SENSEX fell 438.41 points to settle at 17 559.98 at the end of the week after touching the lowest level of that week at 17 226.18 during the day.

The SEBI chief, M. Damodaran, held an hour-long conference on 22 October to clear the air on the proposals to curb P-notes where he announced that funds investing through P-notes were welcome to register as FIIs, whose registration process would be made faster and more streamlined. The markets welcomed the clarifications with an 879-point gain – its biggest single-day surge – on 23 October, thus signalling the end of the P-note crisis. SEBI issued fresh rules regarding P-notes on 25 October 2007, which said that FIIs cannot issue fresh P-notes and existing exposures were to be wound up within 18 months. The SENSEX rebounded the next day (Friday, 26 October) by re-crossing the 19 000 barrier with a 428-point surge. The subsequent Monday (29 October 2007), history was created when the SENSEX leaped 734.5 points to cross the hallowed 20 000 mark.

== Trends ==
According to an expert group constituted by the Ministry of Finance in India, in August 2004, participatory notes constituted about 46 percent of the cumulative net investments in equities by FIIs. According to Dr. Subramanian Swamy, the P-notes contribute about 60% of investment by FIIs.

Participatory notes were never phased out completely as initially hinted by SEBI, while FII registration was streamlined and both cash as well as derivative markets moved to the latter platform. This stabilised inflows as well as increased FII participation. As a result, FII participation through P-notes was down from 51% to 16% over three years. The primary causes cited are:

- Regulatory changes – SEBI banned Overseas Derivative Instruments and asked FIIs to decrease P-note participation to 40%.
- Alternatives – FII registration was made easier.

In June 2012, SEBI ordered FIIs to report monthly details of P-note transactions within 10 days. Earlier, FIIs were given a time of six months for such reporting. This move came just a few weeks after the Government of India's white paper on black money identified P-notes as one of the routes through which black money transferred outside India comes back through a process called round-tripping.

On 24 November 2014, SEBI issued new norms to curb the inflow of illegal funds. The new norms will enhance KYC regulations and shut out entities that form non-transparent structures to filter the kind of money that flows into the country.
