= Pradhan Mantri Jan Dhan Yojana =

Financial scheme of the Indian government

Pradhan Mantri Jan Dhan Yojana (PMJDY)

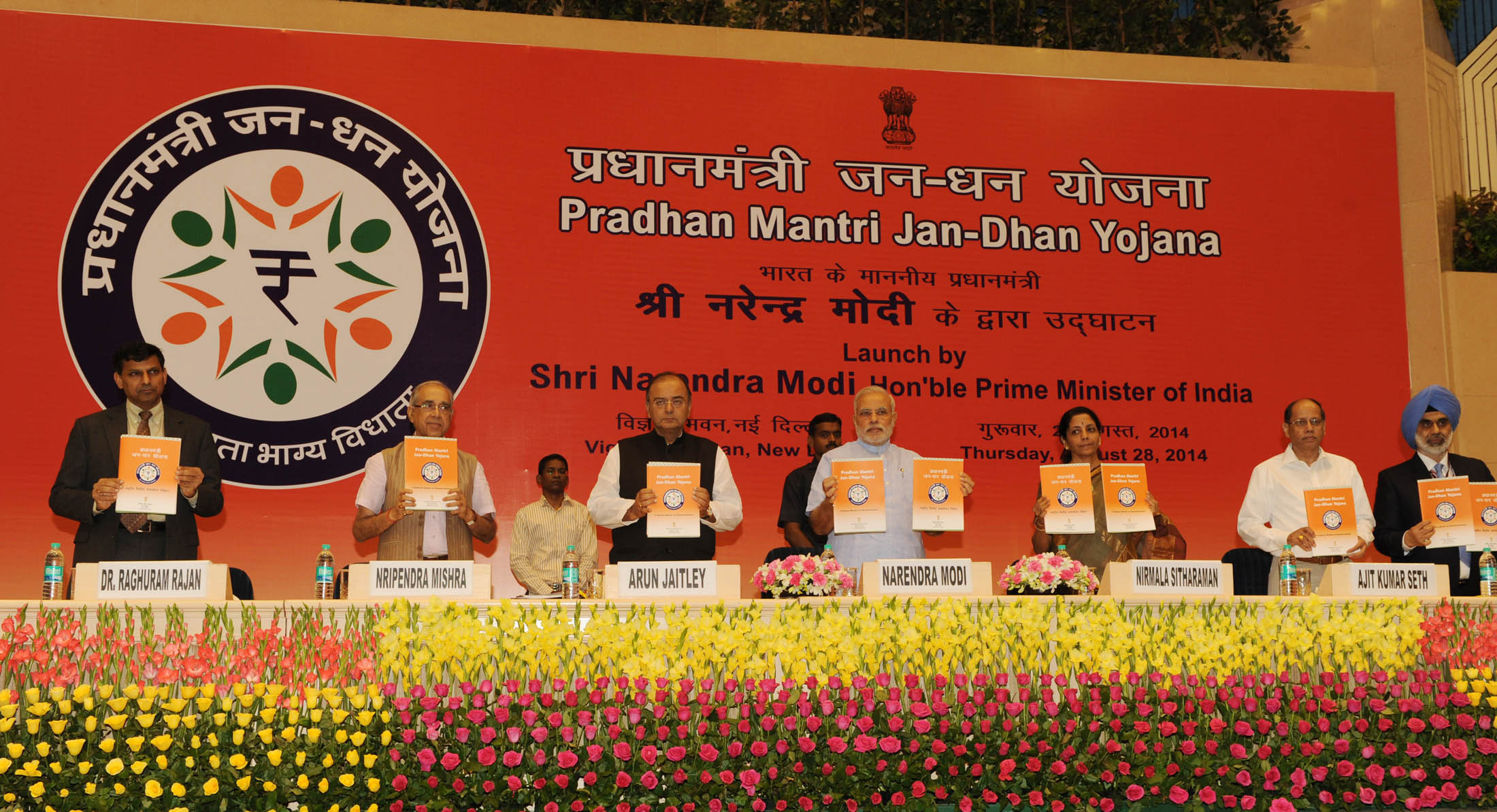
- PM Modi launches the " Pradhan Mantri Jan Dhan Yojana"
- Motto: Mera Khata Bhagya Vidhata
- Type of project: Economic
- Country: India
- Prime Minister(s): Narendra Modi
- Ministry: Finance
- Key people: Nirmala Sitharaman
- Launched: 28 August 2014; 12 years ago
- Status: Active
- Website: www.pmjdy.gov.in

Pradhan Mantri Jan Dhan Yojana (transl. Prime Minister's Public Finance Scheme) is a national financial inclusion program of the Government of India open to Indian citizens (minors of age 10 and older can also open an account with a guardian to manage it), that aims to expand affordable access to financial services such as bank accounts (savings and deposits), remittances, credit, insurance and pensions. This financial inclusion campaign was launched by the Prime Minister of India Narendra Modi on 28 August 2014. He had announced this scheme on his first Independence Day speech on 15 August 2014.

Run by Department of Financial Services, Ministry of Finance, under this scheme 15 million (1.5 crore) bank accounts were opened on inauguration day. The Guinness Book of World Records recognized this achievement, stating: "The most bank accounts opened in one week as a part of the financial inclusion campaign is 18,096,130 and was achieved by the Government of India from August 23 to 29, 2014". By 1 June 2016, over 22 crore (220 million) bank accounts were opened and ₹384.11 billion (US$5.7 billion) were deposited under the scheme, and by 27 June 2018, over 318 million bank accounts and over ₹792 billion (US$12 billion).

== History ==
It was launched by the Prime Minister Narendra Modi on 15 August 2014. The slogan of the scheme is "Mera Khaata, Bhagya Vidhata" (meaning "My account, fortune maker") The scheme was launched after the failure of previous government schemes, including Swaabhimaan. Swaabhimaan was a 2011 campaign of the Government of India which aimed to bring banking services to rural areas.

== JAM Yojana ==
JAM (short for Jan Dhan-Aadhaar-Mobile) trinity refers to the government of India initiative to link Jan Dhan accounts, mobile numbers and Aadhaar cards of Indians to plug the leakages of government subsidies.

The JAM trinity was proposed in the Economic Survey of 2014-15.

=== Aadhaar ===
The Unique Identification Authority of India is a central government agency of India. Its objective is to collect the biometric and demographic data of residents, store them in a centralised database, and issue a 12-digit unique identity number called Aadhaar to each resident. It is considered the world's largest national identification number project.

As of March 2016, the original legislation to back UIDAI is still pending in the Parliament of India. However, on 3 March 2016, a new money bill was introduced in the Parliament for the purpose. On 11 March 2016, the Aadhaar (Targeted Delivery of Financial and other Subsidies, benefits and services) Act, 2016, was passed in the Lok Sabha. On 26 March, 2016, The Aadhaar (Targeted Delivery of financial & Other Subsidies, Benefits & Services) Act, 2016 was notified in the Gazette of India.

Some civil liberty groups, like Citizens Forum for Civil Liberties and Indian Social Action Forum (INSAF), have opposed the project on privacy concerns.

On 23 September 2013, the Supreme Court of India issued an interim order saying that "no person should suffer for not getting Aadhaar" as the government cannot deny a service to a resident if s/he does not possess Aadhaar, as it is voluntary and not mandatory. In another interim order on 11 August 2015, the Supreme Court of India ruled that "UIDAI/Aadhaar will not be used for any other purposes except PDS, kerosene and LPG distribution system" and made it clear that even for availing these facilities Aadhaar card will not be mandatory. However, in 2018 the top court upheld the country’s biometric identity system and also cleared mandatory Aadhaar enrolment of recipients of government welfare benefits, stating "Aadhaar card is however must for availing facilities of welfare schemes and government subsidies as it empowers the poor and marginalised."

== Investments ==
Pradhan Mantri Jan-Dhan Yojana statistics as of 17 August 2022 (All figures in crores)

Jan Dhan Yojana was announced by Narendra Modi on 15 August 2014 and the scheme was launched on 28 August 2014.

| Bank type | Number of beneficiaries | | | | Deposits in accounts | Number of RuPay cards |
| Bank type | Rural/semi-urban | Urban | Female | Total | Deposits in accounts | Number of RuPay cards |
|---|---|---|---|---|---|---|
| Public Sector Banks | 22.84 | 13.61 | 20.09 | 36.45 | ₹133,815.32 | 27.44 |
| Regional Rural Banks | 7.39 | 1.16 | 4.93 | 8.54 | ₹34,156.99 | 3.41 |
| Private Sector Banks | 0.70 | 0.60 | 0.71 | 1.31 | ₹4,876.18 | 1.11 |
| Total | 30.93 | 15.37 | 25.73 | 46.30 | ₹172,848.48 | 31.95 |

Number of bank accounts opened annually

| Year | Jandhan accounts (Cr) |
| Aug-15 | 17.9 |
| Aug-16 | 24.1 |
| Aug-17 | 30.9 |
| Aug-18 | 32.55 |
| Aug-19 | 36.79 |
| Aug-20 | 40.41 |
| Aug-21 | 43.04 |
| Aug-22 | 46.25 |
| Aug-23 | 50.09 |

| Year | Operative Jandhan accounts (Cr) | Percentage |
| Aug-17 | 23.15 | 76% |
| Aug-18 | 26.34 | 80.9% |
| Aug-19 | 30.16 | 82% |
| Aug-20 | 34.9 | 86.3% |
| Aug-21 | 36.86 | 85.6% |
| Aug-22 | 37.57 | 81.2% |

| Year | Deposit Amount in account (cr) |
| Aug-15 | 22901 |
| Aug-16 | 42094 |
| Aug-17 | 65799 |
| Aug-18 | 82039 |
| Aug-19 | 102415 |
| Aug-20 | 130086 |
| Aug-21 | 146230 |
| Aug-22 | 173954 |
| Aug-23 | 203505 |

| Year | Average Deposit Amount per account (Rs) |
| Aug-15 | 1279 |
| Aug-16 | 1747 |
| Aug-17 | 2187 |
| Aug-18 | 2521 |
| Aug-19 | 2783 |
| Aug-20 | 3219 |
| Aug-21 | 3398 |
| Aug-22 | 3761 |
| Aug-23 | 4063 |

== Performance ==
Due to the preparations done in the run-up to the inauguration, 15 million bank accounts were opened on inauguration day. Narendra Modi declared on this occasion, "Let us celebrate today as the day of financial freedom." By September 2014, 30.2 million accounts were opened with:

- State Bank of India 2.99 million accounts,
- Canara Bank 1.62 million accounts,
- Central Bank of India 1.60 million accounts and
- Bank of Baroda 1.42 million accounts.

On 20 January 2015, the scheme entered the Guinness Book of World Records, setting a new record for 'The most bank accounts opened in one week'.

The balances in Jan Dhan accounts rose by more than ₹270 billion (US$2.9 billion) between 9 November 2016 and 23 November 2016. 1.9 million householders have availed of the overdraft facility of ₹2.56 billion (US$27 million) by May 2016. Uttar Pradesh and West Bengal have 29% of the total deposits under the scheme, whereas Kerala and Goa became the first states in the country to have at least one basic bank account in every household.

The total number of account holders stood at 294.8 million, including 176.1 million account holders from rural and semi-urban branches. A total of 227 million RuPay cards have been issued by National Payments Corporation of India (NPCI) till August 2017. The amount of deposits rose to ₹656.97 billion (US$7.0 billion) by August 2017.

According to various studies, "Beyond enabling account ownership and the use of financial services, the PMJDY also facilitated financial inclusion for a variety of demographics. While the program has made significant headway towards genuine financial inclusion, it is clear that improving policy communication, widening and deepening progress in low-income states, and ironing out the kinks in the bank-agent model will be crucial if these hard-fought gains are to prove sustainable." At least 300 million new families have got Jan Dhan accounts in which almost ₹650 billion (US$6.9 billion) have been deposited, Prime Minister Narendra Modi said on 28 August 2017, on the eve of the third anniversary of the scheme.

As of January 27, 2021, a total number of 417.5 million accounts have been opened under the Pradhan Mantri Jan Dhan Yojana (PMJDY), out of which 359.6 million accounts are operative.

According to the World Bank’s Spring 2025 Poverty and Equity Brief, approximately 171 million people in India moved out of extreme poverty between 2011 and 2023, with the poverty rate declining from 16.2% to 2.3% based on the international poverty line of $2.15 per day. The report stated sustained economic growth along with targeted government initiatives, including the Pradhan Mantri Jan Dhan Yojana (PMJDY), as key contributors to this progress. PMJDY significantly expanded financial inclusion by facilitating the opening of over 550 million bank accounts. These accounts were linked to the Aadhaar digital ID system and mobile numbers, forming the JAM trinity (Jan Dhan-Aadhaar-Mobile), which enabled efficient and transparent delivery of government subsidies and welfare benefits. As of March 2023, the Direct Benefit Transfer (DBT) mechanism, supported by Jan Dhan accounts, had saved the government approximately ₹3.48 lakh crore, or around US$4.19 billion, in leakages.

== Reactions ==
The scheme has been criticized by the opposition, and that it has created unnecessary work-burden on the public-sector banks. According to critics, offers like zero balance, free insurance and overdraft facility would result in duplication. Many individuals who already had bank accounts may have had accounts created in their names, lured by insurance cover and overdraft facility. As per the scheme, a very few people are eligible to get the life insurance worth ₹30,000 (US$320) with a validity of just five years. The claimed overdraft facility has been completely left upon the banks. As per the government notice, only those people would get the overdraft facility whose transaction record has satisfactory operations in their account for some time. In March 2018, the Government of India stated that around 20% of Jan Dhan accounts were lying dormant.

In addition, while the Indian Government was ostensibly actively attempting to promote financial inclusion through this scheme, the Reserve Bank of India, permitted banks to charge customers for conducting ATM transactions beyond a certain number of times per month. This effectively prevented people from easily accessing their own savings and discouraged them from using formal banking channels.

== See also ==
- Make in India
- Indian 500 and 1000 rupee currency demonetisation
- Pradhan Mantri Jeevan Jyoti Bima Yojana
- JAM Yojana
