= BSE SENSEX =

Indian stock market index

- Foundation: 1 January 1986 (40 years ago)
- Operator: Asia Index
- Exchanges: BSE
- Trading symbol: ^BSESN
- Constituents: 30
- Type: Large cap
- Market cap: ₹151.78 lakh crore (US$1.6 trillion) (September 2024)
- Weighting method: Free-float market capitalisation
- Related indices: BSE SENSEX 50; BSE SENSEX Next 50
- Website: bseindia.com

The BSE SENSEX (also known as the S&P Bombay Stock Exchange Sensitive Index or simply SENSEX) is an Indian free-float market-weighted stock market index of 30 well-established and financially sound companies listed on the Bombay Stock Exchange. The 30 constituent companies which are some of the largest and most actively traded stocks, are representative of various industrial sectors of the Indian economy. Published since 1 January 1986, the S&P BSE SENSEX is regarded as the pulse of the domestic stock markets in India. The base value of the SENSEX was taken as 100 on 1 April 1979 and its base year as 1978–79. On 25 July 2001, BSE launched DOLLEX-, a dollar-linked version of the SENSEX.

== Etymology ==
The term Sensex was coined by Deepak Mohoni, a stock market analyst in 1989. BSE Sensitive Index then was at about 750 points. Sensex is a portmanteau of the words Sensitive and Index.

== Calculation ==
The BSE has some reviews and modifies its composition to be sure it reflects current market conditions. The index is calculated based on a free float capitalisation method, a variation of the market capitalisation method. Instead of using a company's outstanding shares it uses its float, or shares that are readily available for trading. Free Floating capital implies total capitalization less Directors shareholding. As per free float capitalisation methodology, the level of index at any point of time reflects the free float market value of 30 constituent stocks relative to a base period. The market capitalisation of a company is determined by multiplying the price of its stock by the number of shares issued by corporate actions, replacement of scrips. The index has increased by over twenty five times from June 1990 to the present. Using information from April 1979 onwards, the long-run rate of return on the S&P BSE SENSEX works 18.6% per annum.

== Constituents ==
Company	Symbol	Ticker	Industry	Entry date
Adani Ports & SEZ	ADANIPORTS.BO	532921	Ports	24 June 2024
Asian Paints	ASIANPAINT.BO	500820	Consumer Durables	21 December 2015
Axis Bank	AXISBANK.BO	532215	Banks	23 December 2013
Bajaj Finance	BAJFINANCE.BO	500034	Finance	24 December 2018
Bajaj Finserv	BAJAJFINSV.BO	532978	Finance	22 June 2020
Bharat Electronics	BEL.BO	500049	Aerospace & Defence	23 June 2025
Bharti Airtel	BHARTIARTL.BO	532454	Telecommunication	10 November 2003
Eternal	ETERNAL.BO	543320	Retailing	23 December 2024
HCLTech	HCLTECH.BO	532281	IT	24 December 2018
HDFC Bank	HDFCBANK.BO	500180	Banks	10 November 2003
Hindustan Unilever	HINDUNILVR.BO	500696	FMCG	2 January 1986
ICICI Bank	ICICIBANK.BO	532174	Banks	31 May 2002
IndiGo	INDIGO.BO	539448	Airlines	22 December 2025
Infosys	INFY.BO	500209	IT	16 November 1998
ITC	ITC.BO	500875	FMCG	2 January 1986
Kotak Mahindra Bank	KOTAKBANK.BO	500247	Banks	19 June 2017
Larsen & Toubro	LT.BO	500510	Construction	27 September 2004
Mahindra & Mahindra	M&M.BO	500520	Automobiles	9 July 2007
Maruti Suzuki	MARUTI.BO	532500	Automobiles	19 May 2004
NTPC	NTPC.BO	532555	Power	6 June 2005
Power Grid	POWERGRID.BO	532898	Power	20 June 2016
Reliance Industries	RELIANCE.BO	500325	Petroleum	2 January 1986
State Bank of India	SBIN.BO	500112	Banks	19 August 1996
Sun Pharma	SUNPHARMA.BO	524715	Pharmaceuticals	8 August 2011
Tata Consultancy Services	TCS.BO	532540	IT	6 June 2005
Tata Steel	TATASTEEL.BO	500470	Metals	21 June 2021
Tech Mahindra	TECHM.BO	532755	IT	24 June 2019
Titan Company	TITAN.BO	500114	Consumer Durables	23 December 2019
Trent	TRENT.BO	500251	Retailing	23 June 2025
UltraTech Cement	ULTRACEMCO.BO	532538	Cement	23 December 2019

== Index changes ==
Constituent removed	Replaced by	Date of replacement
Reliance Communications	Sun Pharma	8 August 2011
Reliance Infra	Coal India	8 August 2011
Tata Power	Lupin	22 June 2015
Hindalco Industries	Asian Paints	21 December 2015
Bharat Heavy Electricals	Power Grid Corporation of India	20 June 2016
GAIL	Kotak Mahindra Bank	19 June 2017
Cipla	IndusInd Bank	18 December 2017
Lupin	Yes Bank	18 December 2017
Dr. Reddy's Laboratories	Vedanta	18 June 2018
Wipro	HCL Technologies	24 December 2018
Adani Ports & SEZ	Bajaj Finance	24 December 2018
Vedanta	Nestlé India	23 December 2019
Yes Bank	Titan Company	23 December 2019
Tata Motors	UltraTech Cement	23 December 2019
Tata Steel	Dr. Reddy's Laboratories	21 December 2020
Oil and Natural Gas Corporation	Tata Steel	21 June 2021
Bajaj Auto	Wipro	20 December 2021
Dr. Reddy's Laboratories	Tata Motors	19 December 2022
HDFC	JSW Steel	13 July 2023
Wipro	Adani Ports & SEZ	24 June 2024
JSW Steel	Zomato	23 December 2024

== Record values ==
Category	All-time highs	
Closing	85,836.12	Thursday, 26 September 2024
Intra-day	85,978.25	Friday, 27 September 2024

== Milestones ==
Chart of S&P BSE SENSEX monthly data from January 1991 to May 2013

The following is a timeline on the rise of the SENSEX through Indian stock market history.

- 1000, 25 July 1990 – On 25 July 1990, the SENSEX touched the four-digit figure for the first time and closed at 1,001 in the wake of a good monsoon and excellent corporate results.
- 2000, 15 January 1992 – On 15 January 1992, the SENSEX crossed the 2,000 mark and closed at 2,020 followed by the liberal economic policy initiatives undertaken, under the leadership of the then prime minister PV Narasimha Rao, by the then finance minister and former Prime Minister of India Dr. Manmohan Singh.
- 3000, 29 February 1992 – On 29 February 1992, the SENSEX surged past the 3,000 mark in the wake of the market-friendly budget announced by Manmohan Singh.
- 4000, 30 March 1992 – On 30 March 1992, the SENSEX crossed the 4,000 mark and closed at 4,091 on the expectations of a liberal export-import policy. It was then that the Harshad Mehta scam hit the markets and SENSEX witnessed unabated selling.
- 5000, 11 October 1999 – On 11 October 1999, the SENSEX crossed the 5,000 mark, as the Bharatiya Janata Party-led coalition won the majority in the 13th Lok Sabha election.
- 6000, 11 February 2000 – On 11 February 2000, the information technology boom helped the SENSEX to cross the 6,000 mark and hit an all-time high of 6,006 points. This record would stand for nearly four years, until 2 January 2004, when the SENSEX closed at 6,026.59 points.
- 7000, 21 June 2005 – On 20 June 2005, the news of the settlement between the Ambani brothers boosted investor sentiments and the scrips of RIL, Reliance Energy, Reliance Capital and IPCL made huge gains. This helped the SENSEX crossed 7,000 points for the first time.
- 8000, 8 September 2005 – On 8 September 2005, the Bombay Stock Exchange's benchmark 30-share index – the SENSEX – crossed the 8,000 level following brisk buying by foreign and domestic funds in early trading.
- 9000, 9 December 2005 – The SENSEX on 28 November 2005 crossed 9,000 and touched a peak of 9,000.32 points during mid-session at the Bombay Stock Exchange on the back of frantic buying spree by foreign institutional investors and well supported by local operators as well as retail investors. However, it was on 9 December 2005 that the SENSEX first closed at over 9,000 points.
- 10,000, 7 February 2006 – The SENSEX on 6 February 2006 touched 10,003 points during mid-session. The SENSEX finally closed above the 10,000 mark on 7 February 2006.
- 20,000, 11 December 2007 – The SENSEX on 29 October 2007 crossed the 20,000 mark for the first time during intra-day trading, but closed at 19,977.67 points. However, it was on 11 December 2007 that it finally closed at a figure above 20,000 points on the back of aggressive buying by funds.
- 21,000, 5 November 2010 – The SENSEX on 8 January 2008 crossed the 21,000 mark for the first time, reaching an intra-day peak of 21,078 points, before closing at 20,873. However, it was not until 5 November 2010 that the SENSEX closed at 21,004.96, for its first close above 21,000 points. This record would stand for nearly three years, until 30 October 2013, when the SENSEX closed at 21,033.97 points.
- 19 February 2013 – SENSEX becomes S&P SENSEX as BSE ties up with Standard and Poor's to use the S&P brand for Sensex and other indices.
- 13 March 2014 - The SENSEX closes higher than the Hang Seng Index, to become the major Asian stock market index with the highest value, for the first time ever.
- 22,000, 24 March 2014 – The SENSEX on 10 March 2014 crossed the 22,000 mark for the first time during intra-day trading. However, it was on 24 March 2014 that the index finally closed above the milestone at 22,095.30.
- 23,000, 9 May 2014 - The SENSEX crossed record 23,000 level for the first time, but close just short of the milestone level, on 9 May 2014. The index would close well above the 23,000 mark during the following session.
- 12 May 2014 - The SENSEX closed at its record all-time high of 23,551, a rise of 2.42%(+556.77 points) intraday due to continued fund inflows on hopes of a stable government.
- 24,000, 13 May 2014 - The SENSEX crossed record 24,000 level for the first time, on 13 May 2014 and reached its peak of 24,067.11 due to sustained capital inflows by foreign funds at the domestic bourses and widespread buying by retail investors after exit polls showing the BJP-led NDA forming the government lifted the key indices to new highs. However it closed at a little low at 23,905 points
- 25,000, 16 May 2014 - The SENSEX crossed record 25,000 level for the first time, on 16 May 2014 and reached its peak of 25,364.71 due to winning of the BJP led NDA government by a staggering record marginal difference of all times. However, it closed well below the 25,000 mark. Still, the index closed at its all-time high of 24,121.74, for its first close above 24,000 points. The SENSEX closed at 25,019.51, for its first close above the 25,000 milestone on 5 June 2014
- 26,000, 7 July 2014- The SENSEX crossed record 26,000 level for the first time on 7 July 2014 and reached its peak of 26,123.55, before closing slightly lower at 26,100.08, in anticipation of strong reformatory budget by the new government.
- 27,000, 2 September 2014 - The SENSEX closed at 27,019.39, for its first close above the 27,000 level, on 2 September 2014. This is the sixth 1000-point milestone the index has crossed in 2014, tying a record set in 2007.
- 28,000, 5 November 2014 - The SENSEX crossed 28,000 mark, on 5 November 2014. One week later, on 12 November 2014, the index would close above the milestone for the first time. This is the seventh 1000-point milestone the index has crossed in 2014, breaking the six 1000-point record set in 2007.
- 29,000, 23 January 2015 - BSE Sensex today set a new high of 29,408 points and all-time closing high of 29,278.84, up 272.82 points
- 30,000, 4 March 2015 - The Sensex breaches 30000 mark following steps taken by the Reserve Bank of India in cutting the repo rates.
- 26 April 2017 - The SENSEX closed at 30,133.35, for its first close above the 30,000 level.
- 31,000, 26 May 2017- The SENSEX crossed record 31,000 level for the first time on 26 May 2017 and reached its peak of 31,074.07, before closing slightly lower at 31,028.21.
- 32,000, 13 July 2017 - The SENSEX closed at 32,037.38, for its first close above the 32,000 level, on 13 July 2017.
- 33,000, 25 October 2017 - The SENSEX closed at 33,042.50, for its first close above the 33,000 level.
- 34,000, 26 December 2017 - The SENSEX closed at 34,010.62, for its first close above the 34,000 level.
- 35,000, 17 January 2018 - The SENSEX closed at 35,081.82, for its first close above the 35,000 level.
- 36,000, 23 January 2018 - The SENSEX closed at 36,139.98, for its first close above the 36,000 level.
- 37,000, 27 July 2018 - The SENSEX on 26 July 2018 crossed the 37,000 mark for the first time during intra-day trading. On 27 July 2018 the index closed above the milestone.
- 38,000, 9 August 2018 - For the first time SENSEX passed the score of 38,000 during intra-day trading, and then closed at 38,024.37.
- 39,000, 1 April 2019 – The SENSEX on 1 April 2019 crossed the 39,000 mark for the first time during intra-day trading.
- 2 April 2019 – The SENSEX closed at 39,056.65, for its first close above the 39,000 level.
- 40,000, 23 May 2019 – The SENSEX crossed "40,000.100" at 10:45 AM for the first time. (2019 Loksabha (House of the People) Election results were getting published)
- 41,000, 26 November 2019 – The SENSEX crossed "41,120.28" first time during intraday trading.
- 42,000, 16 January 2020 - The SENSEX crossed 42,000 mark with an all-time high of 42,059.45 at around 09:47 AM.
- 45,000, 4 December 2020 - The SENSEX crossed 45,000 mark with an all-time high of 45,033 at around 10:30 AM.
- 46,000, 9 December 2020 - The SENSEX crossed 46,000 mark with an all-time high of 46,017 at around 1:30 PM.
- 50,000, 21 January 2021 - The SENSEX crossed 50,000 mark with an all-time high of 50,181 at around 1:31 PM.
- 60,000, 24 September 2021 - The SENSEX crossed 60,000 mark with an all-time high of 60,218 at around 9:30 AM.
- 70,000, 11 December 2023 - The SENSEX crossed 70,000 mark with an all-time high of 70,057.83 at around 10:25 AM.
- 80,000, 3 July 2024 - The SENSEX crossed the 80,000 mark with an all-time high of 80,074.30 at around 9:52 AM.

== The SENSEX since 2006 ==
=== May–December 2006 ===
On 22 May 2006, the SENSEX plunged by 1,100 points during intra-day trading, leading to the suspension of trading for the first time since 17 May 2004. The volatility of the SENSEX had caused investors to lose ₹6 lakh crore (US$131 billion) within seven trading sessions. The then Finance Minister of India, P. Chidambaram, made an unscheduled press statement when trading was suspended to assure investors that nothing was wrong with the fundamentals of the economy, and advised retail investors to stay invested. When trading resumed after the reassurances of the Reserve Bank of India and the Securities and Exchange Board of India (SEBI), the SENSEX managed to move up 700 points, but still finished the session 457 points in the red.

The SENSEX eventually recovered from the volatility, and on 16 October 2006, the SENSEX closed at an all-time high of 12,928.18 with an intra-day high of 12,953.76. This was a result of increased confidence in the economy and reports that India's manufacturing sector grew by 11.1% in August 2006.

- 13,000, 30 October 2006 – The SENSEX on 30 October 2006 crossed 13,000 mark for the first time, touching a peak of 13,039.36, before closing at 13,024.26 points. It took 135 days to reach 13,000 from 12,000, and 124 days to reach 13,000 from 12,500.
- 14,000, 5 December 2006 – The SENSEX on 5 December 2006 crossed 14,000 mark for the first time, after opening the day with a peak of 14,028 at 9.58 am (IST).

=== July–September 2007: Effects of the subprime crisis in U.S. ===
- 15,000, 6 July 2007- The SENSEX on 6 July 2007 crossed another milestone and reached a magic figure of 15,000. It took 7 months and one day after first reaching the 14,000 milestone to touch this historic milestone.

On 23 July 2007, the SENSEX touched a new high of 15,733 points. On 27 July 2007 the SENSEX witnessed a huge decline because of selling by Foreign Institutional Investors and global cues to come back to 15,160 points by noon. Following global cues and heavy selling in the international markets, the BSE SENSEX fell by 615 points in a single day on 1 August 2007.

- 16,000, 19 September 2007- The SENSEX on 19 September 2007 crossed the 16,000 mark, closing at a historic peak of 16,322. The bull hits because of the rate cut of 50 bit/s in the discount rate by the Fed chief Ben Bernanke.
- 17,000, 26 September 2007- On 26 September 2007, the SENSEX crossed the 17,000 mark for the first time, creating a record for the second fastest 1000 point gain in just 5 trading sessions. It failed however to sustain the momentum and closed below 17,000. The SENSEX closed above 17,000 for the first time on the following day. Reliance group has been the main contributor in this bull run, contributing 256 points. This also helped Mukesh Ambani's net worth to grow to over ₹2 lakh crore ($50 billion). It was also during this record bull run that the SENSEX for the first time zoomed ahead of the Nikkei of Japan.

=== October–December 2007: Participatory notes issue ===
- 18,000, 9 October 2007- The SENSEX crossed the 18,000 mark for the first time on 9 October 2007, gaining 788 points, to close at 18,280. The journey from 17,000 to 18,000 took just 8 trading sessions, which is the third fastest 1000-point rise in the history of the SENSEX.
- 19,000, 15 October 2007- The SENSEX crossed the 19,000 mark for the first time on 15 October 2007, gaining 640 points, to close at 19,059. It took just 4 trading sessions for the SENSEX to move from 18,000 to 19,000. This is the fastest 1000-point rise ever for the index. In addition, the rise from 16,000 to 19,000 in 17 trading sessions sets a record for the fastest 3,000-point rally in the history of the SENSEX.

On 16 October 2007, SEBI (Securities & Exchange Board of India) proposed curbs on participatory notes which accounted for roughly 50% of FII investment in 2007. SEBI was not happy with P-notes because it was not possible to know who owned the underlying securities, and hedge funds acting through P-notes might therefore cause volatility in the Indian markets.

However the proposals of SEBI were not clear and this led to a knee-jerk crash when the markets opened on the following day (17 October 2007). Within a minute of opening trade, the SENSEX crashed by 1,744 points or about 9% of its value – the biggest intra-day fall in Indian stock markets in absolute terms until then. This led to the automatic suspension of trade for one hour. Finance Minister P. Chidambaram issued clarifications, in the meantime, that the government was not against FIIs and was not immediately banning PNs. After the market opened at 10:55 am, the index staged a comeback and ended the day at 18715.82, down 336.04 from the last day's close.

However, this would not be the end of the volatility. The next day (18 October 2007), the SENSEX tumbled by 717.43 points – 3.83 per cent – to close at 17,998.39 points. The slide continued the next day (19 October 2007), when the SENSEX fell 438.41 points to settle at 17,559.98 to the end of the week, after touching the lowest level of that week at 17,226.18 during the day.

After detailed clarifications from the SEBI chief M. Damodaran regarding the new rules, the market made an 879-point gain on 23 October, thus signalling the end of the PN crisis.

- 20,000, 11 December 2007- On 29 October 2007, the SENSEX crossed the 20,000 mark for the first time with a massive 734.5-point gain, but closed below the 20,000 mark. The SENSEX would close above the 20,000 mark for the first time on 11 December 2007. It took 42 days after reaching the 19,000 milestone to close above 20,000 points for the first time. The journey of the last 10,000 points was covered in just 483 sessions, compared to 7,297 sessions taken to touch the 10,000 mark from its base value of 100 points. In the second half of 2007 alone, the SENSEX reached six 1,000-point milestones.

=== May 2009 ===
On 18 May 2009, the SENSEX surged up 2,110.79 points to close at 14,285.21, from its previous closing of 12,174.42, for its largest single day rally. Less than a month later, on 4 June 2009, the SENSEX would cross the 15,000 mark.

However, the SENSEX remained volatile during the summer of 2009. The SENSEX plunged by 869.65 points on 6 July 2009, the day of Union Budget presentation in Parliament on concerns over high fiscal deficit. This was the biggest Budget-day loss for the index. On 17 August 2009, the SENSEX lost 626.71 points.

Once again, the SENSEX would recover from the volatility. On 7 September 2009, the SENSEX crossed the 16,000 mark, closing at 16,016.32 points. The index would gain 3,000 points over the next 12 months, as the SENSEX crossed the 19,000 mark on 13 September 2010, closing at 19,208.33 points.

- 21,000, 5 November 2010 - The SENSEX closed at 21,004.96, for its first close above the 21,000 mark. It would take nearly three years for the index to make its next close above this level.
- 22,000, 24 March 2014 - The SENSEX closed at 22,055.48, for its first close above the 22,000 mark. For the first time, the SENSEX zoomed ahead of the Hang Seng Index.
- 23,000, 12 May 2014 - The SENSEX closed at 23,551.00, for its first close above the 23,000 mark,
- 24,000, 16 May 2014 - The SENSEX closed at 24,121.74, for its first close above the 24,000 mark, Breaking all previous records and above all other indexes in the world.
- 25,000, 5 June 2014 - The SENSEX closed at 25,019.51, for its first close above the 25,000 mark,
- 26,000, 7 July 2014 - The SENSEX closed at 26,123.55, for its first close above the 26,000 mark,
- 27,000, 2 September 2014 - The SENSEX closed at 27019.39, for its first close above the 27,000 mark,
- 28,000, 5 November 2014 - The SENSEX crossed 28,000 mark, on 5 November 2014. This is the seventh 1000-point milestone the index has crossed in 2014, breaking the six 1000-point record set in 2007.

== Major SENSEX stock market plunges ==
=== January 2008 ===
In the third week of January 2008, the SENSEX experienced huge falls along with other markets around the world. On 21 January 2008, the SENSEX saw its highest ever loss of 1,408 points at the end of the session. The SENSEX recovered to close at 17,605.40 after it tumbled to the day's low of 16,963.96, on high volatility as investors panicked following weak global cues amid fears of a recession in US.

The next day, the BSE SENSEX index went into a free fall. The index hit the lower circuit breaker in barely a minute after the markets opened at 10 am. Trading was suspended for an hour. On reopening at 10.55 am IST, the market saw its biggest intra-day fall when it hit a low of 15,332, down 2,273 points. However, after reassurance from the Finance Minister of India, the market bounced back to close at 16,730 with a loss of 875 points.

Over the course of two days, the BSE SENSEX in India dropped from 19,013 on Monday morning to 16,730 by Tuesday evening or a two-day fall of 13.9%. Less than a month later, on 11 February 2008, the SENSEX lost 833.98 points, when Reliance Power fell below its IPO price in its debut trade after a high-profile public offer.

=== March 2008 ===
The free fall of the SENSEX accelerated in March 2008. The month started out with the Sensex losing 900.84 points on 3 March 2008, on concerns emanating from growing credit losses in US. This would be the first of four one-day falls of greater than 700 points during the month. On 13 March 2008, the SENSEX plummeted another 770.63 points on global economic jitters.

- 14,810, 17 March 2008 - The SENSEX dropped by 951.03 points on the global credit crisis and distress, to fall below the 15,000 mark, closing at 14,810.

The month ended with the SENSEX shedding 726.85 points on 31 March 2008, after heavy selling in blue-chip stocks on global economic fears.

- 13,802, 27 June 2008 - The SENSEX dropped by 600 points, to fall below the 14,000 mark, closing at 13,802.
- 12,962, 1 July 2008 - The SENSEX falls below the 13,000 mark, closing at 12,962.
- 11,802, 6 October 2008 - The SENSEX dropped by 724.62 points amid fears of the US recession and attempts by governments across the world to save their failing banks, to fall below the 12,000 mark, closing at 11,802.
- 10,527, 10 October 2008 - The SENSEX dropped by 800.51 points amid weak industrial production data and concerns over impact of global economic crisis on IT and banking firms in India, to fall below the 11,000 mark, closing at 10,527.
- 9,975, 17 October 2008 – The SENSEX crashes below the psychological 5-figure mark of 10,000 points, closing at 9,975.35, following extremely negative global financial indications in US and other countries. Just ten months earlier, in December 2007, SENSEX had closed above the 20,000 mark for the first time.
- 8,701.07, 24 October 2008 - The SENSEX lost 10.96% of its value (1070.63 points) on the intra-day trade, closing at 8,701.07, for its first close below the 9,000 mark since 14 June 2006, after RBI lowered its GDP growth forecasts on global economic concerns. The loss was the 2nd highest in terms of total points, and the 3rd highest percentage-wise, for a one-day period in the index's history.
- 8,509.56, 27 October 2008 - The SENSEX hit an intra-day low of 7,697.39, before closing at 8,509.56, for its lowest close since 14 November 2005.

=== Early 2009 ===
The SENSEX dropped by 749.05 points on 7 January 2009, when the Satyam fraud came to light.

- 8,160.40, 9 March 2009 - The SENSEX closed at 8,160.40, for its lowest close since 2 November 2005.

=== 2015 ===
The index crossed the historical mark of 30,000 after repo rate cut announcement by RBI.

The index plummeted by over 1,624.51 points on 24 August 2015, the then worst one-day point plunge in the index's history.

=== 2020 ===
On 9 March 2020, Sensex tumbled down by 1941.67 points amid the fears of coronavirus pandemic and Yes Bank crisis. This was the second worst single-day fall in the history, where the investors lost ₹6.50 lakh crores ($91 billion). While on 12 March 2020, the index plunged down by 2919.26 points, the second–worst fall in the history, ending in red to a 33-month low at 32,778.14. The fall wiped off ₹11.2 lakh crores wealth ($160 billion).

On Friday, 13 March, trading was halted for 45 minutes for the first time in 12 years since January 2008 due to lower circuit. Sensex touched a low of 29,687.52 down by 3090.62 points (or 9.43%). However, after the 45-minute halt, the index saw biggest intra-day recovery by 5,380 points to end up by 1325 points.

Continuing the losing streak, wealth worth ₹14.22 lakh crore ($200 Billion) was erased on 23 March 2020 as BSE SENSEX lost 3,934.72 points to end at 25,981.24.

As on 21 January 2021, Sensex has recovered to 50,167.71.

== Major falls ==
On the following dates, the SENSEX index suffered major single-day falls at close (of 430 or more points):

S.No.	Date	Points	Reason
1	28 April 1992	570	
2	17 May 2004	565	
3	15 May 2006	463	
4	18 May 2006	826	
5	19 May 2006	453	
6	22 May 2006	457	
7	2 April 2007	617	
8	1 August 2007	615	
9	16 August 2007	642.70	
10	17 October 2007	717.43	
11	21 November 2007	678.18	
12	17 December 2007	769.48	
13	18 January 2008	687.82	
14	21 January 2008	1408.35	Due to the US subprime mortgage crisis.
15	22 January 2008	875	Due to the US subprime mortgage crisis.
16	11 February 2008	833.98	
17	3 March 2008	900.84	
18	13 March 2008	770.63	
19	17 March 2008	951.03	
20	31 March 2008	726.85	
21	27 June 2008	600	
22	15 September 2008	710	
23	6 October 2008	724.62	
24	10 October 2008	792.17	
25	24 October 2008	704	
26	7 January 2009	749.05	
27	6 July 2009	869.65	
28	17 August 2009	626.71	
29	12 November 2010	432	
30	16 November 2010	444.55	
31	4 February 2011	441.92	
32	24 February 2011	545.92	
33	22 September 2011	704	
34	27 February 2012	477.82	
35	13 May 2013	430.65	
36	31 May 2013	455.10	
37	20 June 2013	526.41	
38	6 August 2013	449.22	
39	16 August 2013	769.41	Due to depreciation of the Indian rupee.
40	27 August 2013	590.05	
41	3 September 2013	651.47	
42	18 November 2013	451.32	
43	8 July 2014	517.97	
44	16 December 2014	538.12	
45	6 January 2015	854.86	
46	30 January 2015	498.82	
47	9 February 2015	490.52	
48	9 March 2015	604.17	
49	26 March 2015	654.25	
50	5 May 2015	722	
51	24 August 2015	1624.51	Driven by the meltdown in the Chinese stock market.
52	22 September 2015	541.14	
53	4 January 2016	537.55	
54	7 January 2016	554.50	
55	11 February 2016	807.07	
56	11 November 2016	698.86	Driven by 2016 US Election Results.
57	2 February 2018	839.91	Driven by 2018 Union Budget of India.
58	4 October 2018	806.47	Panic fall, due to oil price increase and rupee fall against US Dollar.
59	5 October 2018	800.51	Panic fall, due to oil price increase and rupee fall against US Dollar.
60	8 July 2019	792.82	Driven by Union Budget and global equity sell off.
61	13 August 2019	624	
62	22 August 2019	587.44	Due to concerns about slowing Indian economy.
62	6 January 2020	787.98	
63	1 February 2020	987.96	Driven by 2020 Union Budget of India.
64	28 February 2020	1448.37	Driven by coronavirus outbreak.
65	6 March 2020	893.99	Due to global sell-off driven by coronavirus concerns.
66	9 March 2020	1941.67	Due to coronavirus concerns.
67	12 March 2020	2919.26	Due to coronavirus concerns.
68	16 March 2020	2713.41	Due to coronavirus concerns.
69	17 March 2020	810.98	Due to coronavirus concerns and fears of recession.
70	18 March 2020	1709.58	Due to the COVID-19 pandemic.
71	19 March 2020	581.28	Due to the COVID-19 pandemic.
72	23 March 2020	3934.72	Due to the COVID-19 pandemic and nationwide lockdown.
73	1 April 2020	1203.18	Due to the COVID-19 pandemic.
74	3 April 2020	674.36	Due to the COVID-19 pandemic.
75	24 April 2020	535.86	Due to the COVID-19 pandemic.
76	4 May 2020	2002.27	Due to the COVID-19 pandemic.
77	14 May 2020	885.72	Due to the COVID-19 pandemic.
78	18 May 2020	1068.75	Due to the COVID-19 pandemic.
79	11 June 2020	708.68	Driven by global equity sell-off.
80	5 April 2021	708.69	Due to the second wave of coronavirus in India.
81	13 April 2021	1708	Due to second wave of coronavirus and lockdown threats.
82	31 October 2021	677.77	Continuous selling by FIIs, dull global performance and mixed corporate earnings.
83	24 February 2022	2702.15	Driven by Russian invasion of Ukraine
84	19 May 2022	1416.30	Driven by inflation concerns
85	4 June 2024	4389.73	Driven due to 2024 Lok Sabha election
86	5 August 2024	2222.55	The global sell-off was primarily driven by fears of a U.S. recession, weak U.S. unemployment data, geopolitical tensions, and the unwinding of the Yen trade.
87	7 April 2025	2226.79	This downturn was primarily attributed to investor concerns regarding U.S. tariff policies and the potential for escalating global trade tensions.
88	1 feb 2026	1547	2026 Union budget of India
89	19 March 2026	2496	middle east escalation
90	23 March 2026	1837	middle east escalation
91	27 March 2026	1690	2026 Iran war
92	30 March 2026	1635	2026 Iran war

== Major highs ==
Sl. No.	Date	High	Reason
1	31 Oct 2019	40,392.22	Continuous buying by foreign institutional investors (FIIs). Tax cut buzz. US Fed rate cut. US-China trade hopes. Corporate results being better than expected.
2	20 Nov 2019	40,816.38	Trade lifted by buying in index heavyweights like Reliance Industries, Bharti Airtel, and ICICI Bank.
3	20 Dec 2019	41,809.96	FII's inflows & gains by Tata Steel, SBI & Yes Bank

== See also ==
- NIFTY 50
- List of stock market crashes and bear markets
- List of stock market indices
- List of major stock exchanges
- List of countries by stock market capitalization
- Nasdaq
- S&P 500
