= Food security in India =

Food security has been a major concern in India. In 2022, the Global Food Security Index ranked India at 68th out of the 113 major countries in terms of food security. In 2024, the Global Hunger Index ranked India at 105th out of 127 countries with a score of 27.3. According to the United Nations, there are nearly 195 million undernourished people in India that make up a quarter of the world's undernourished population. In addition, roughly 43% of children in India are chronically undernourished. Though the current nutritional standards meet 100% of daily food requirements, India lags far behind in terms of a quality protein intake at 10%; this shortcoming can be alleviated by making available protein-rich food products such as soybeans, lentils, meat, eggs, dairy, etc. more readily accessible and affordable for Indian citizens. The Human Rights Measurement Initiative finds that India is operating at only 56.8% of its capacity based its economic power to ensure its citizens have adequate food security.

In order to ensure citizens' fundamental rights to accessible and affordable food, the Parliament of India enacted the National Food Security Act in 2013. Also known as the Right to Food Act, this Act seeks to provide subsidized food grains to approximately two-thirds of India's 1.33 billion population. It was signed into law on 10 September 2013, retroactive to 5 July 2013.

== Schemes by government ==
=== Central Initiatives ===
- The Food Corporation of India (FCI) was established in 1965 for the purpose of procurement, storage, and distribution of food grains. It has been playing a major role in the food security of India.
- The National Food Security Act, 2013 (NFSA 2013) converts into legal entitlements for existing food security programs of the Government of India. It also includes the Midday Meal Scheme, Integrated Child Development Services scheme, and the Public Distribution System. In 2017–18, over Rs 1500 billion (7.6% of the government's total expenditure) have been allocated to provide food subsidies under the Targeted Public Distribution System (TPDS).
- The NFSA 2013 also recognizes maternity entitlements. Pregnant women, lactating mothers, and certain categories of children are eligible for daily free cereals.

=== State Initiatives ===
- Kerala has implemented several decentralised food security initiatives through the Local Self Government Department and Kudumbashree. The Kudumbashree-run Janakeeya Hotels provide subsidised meals at low cost across the state as part of poverty alleviation and livelihood programmes. In Kochi, the municipal corporation operates Samridhi@Kochi, a subsidised meal initiative implemented with Kudumbashree units to provide affordable food through designated outlets.
- Karnataka has launched the 'Indira Canteen', which serves breakfast, lunch, and dinner at a very low price. This idea was implemented by Siddaramaiah as CM so that no one in the state would go hungry and everyone would get healthy food.
- Andhra Pradesh has supported the Nalabothu Foundation, which provides free meals to people in need by redistributing excess food from homes, restaurants, businesses, canteens, and gatherings. This scheme was brought to national attention by Prime Minister Modi.
- Tamil Nadu has launched 'Amma Unavagam' (Mother's canteen), or more commonly known as Amma canteen. The genesis of this program could be traced to the scheme proposed by Nimbkar Agricultural Research Institute in 2012 and is continuing its part in the mid-day meal scheme.

== Challenges for India ==
A lack of access to affordable and healthy foods is widespread throughout India. With over 60% of India's population depending on agriculture for their livelihoods, the agricultural sector is critical for both India's economy and food security levels across the country. However, India's agricultural sector faces a growing number of challenges, including lower agricultural productivity due to climate volatility and reduced available farmland partially due to India's rapidly increasing population outpacing economic growth that strains India's natural resources and land availability.

India produces around 100 million tonnes of rice every year. While there might be enough food for the whole population of India, many families and especially children in India don't have access to food because of financial problems. Thus, this is the cause of millions of malnourished children around India. The cultural knowledge in India allows them to have a very nutritional and balanced diet.

Nearly the whole of the Indian population has rice at least once a day which allows them to have carbohydrates in their system. Since India is most commonly known for producing and exporting rice to other countries, their lifestyle will be mainly dominated by rice.

== See also ==
- Bengal famine of 1943
- Green Revolution
- White revolution
- Public Distribution System
- National food security act, 2013
- Welfare schemes in India
- Antyodaya Anna Yojana
