= Bharatiya Janata Party campaign for the 2024 Indian general election =

Political Campaign for Indian general election

- Campaign for: 2024 Indian general election
- Affiliation: Bharatiya Janata Party
- PM Candidate: Narendra Modi (Prime Minister of India)
- Alliance: National Democratic Alliance
- Slogans: Modi Ki Guarantee; Modi's Guarantee; Teesri Baar Modi Sarkar, Abki Baar 400 Paar; Modi government for the third time, this time it [seats] will reach 400; Modi Hai Toh Mumkin Hai; When Modi is there, it is possible
- Key people: Narendra Modi; Amit Shah; J. P. Nadda; Rajnath Singh; Nitin Gadkari; Shivraj Singh Chouhan; Yogi Adityanath
- Issues: Citizenship (Amendment) Act, 2019; Abrogation of Article 370; Successful implementation of social welfare schemes Economic freedom Nationalist foreign policy Anti-corruption; Anti-nepotism in politics Support for the construction of the Ram Mandir
- Website: Bharatiya Janata Party Official Website
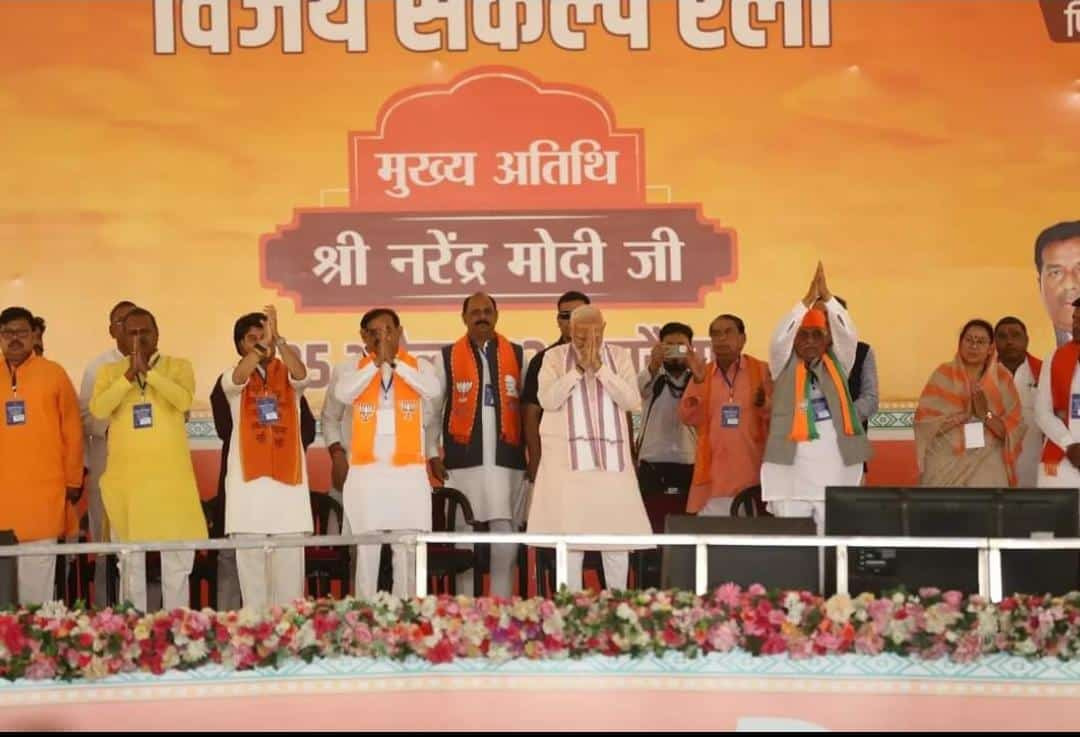

The Bharatiya Janata Party (BJP) is one of the two major political parties in India and has been the ruling party since the 16th Lok Sabha. It successfully sought re-election in the 2024 parliamentary election as the leading party of the National Democratic Alliance, with Narendra Modi as its Prime Ministerial candidate.

== Background ==
The campaign follows the successful campaign in 2014 and 2019, where the BJP won a majority of the seats in the Lok Sabha.

The national executive meeting of BJP held on 16 and 17 January 2023 saw the party reaffirm its faith in Prime Minister Narendra Modi and extend the tenure of BJP national president J. P. Nadda.

== Alliance ==
The National Democratic Alliance abbreviated as NDA (IAST: Rāṣhṭrīya Jānātāntrik Gaṭhabandhan) is a big-tent, mostly centre-right to right-wing political alliance led by the Bharatiya Janata Party.

Party	State/UT	Seats contested		Seats won	
Bharatiya Janata Party	Uttar Pradesh	75	441	33	240
Bharatiya Janata Party	West Bengal	42	441	12	240
Bharatiya Janata Party	Madhya Pradesh	29	441	29	240
Bharatiya Janata Party	Maharashtra	28	441	9	240
Bharatiya Janata Party	Gujarat	26	441	25	240
Bharatiya Janata Party	Karnataka	25	441	17	240
Bharatiya Janata Party	Rajasthan	25	441	14	240
Bharatiya Janata Party	Tamil Nadu	23	441	0	240
Bharatiya Janata Party	Odisha	21	441	20	240
Bharatiya Janata Party	Bihar	17	441	12	240
Bharatiya Janata Party	Telangana	17	441	8	240
Bharatiya Janata Party	Kerala	16	441	1	240
Bharatiya Janata Party	Jharkhand	13	441	8	240
Bharatiya Janata Party	Punjab	13	441	0	240
Bharatiya Janata Party	Assam	11	441	9	240
Bharatiya Janata Party	Chhattisgarh	11	441	10	240
Bharatiya Janata Party	Haryana	10	441	5	240
Bharatiya Janata Party	Delhi	7	441	7	240
Bharatiya Janata Party	Andhra Pradesh	6	441	3	240
Bharatiya Janata Party	Uttarakhand	5	441	5	240
Bharatiya Janata Party	Himachal Pradesh	4	441	4	240
Bharatiya Janata Party	Arunachal Pradesh	2	441	2	240
Bharatiya Janata Party	Dadra and Nagar Haveli and Daman and Diu	2	441	1	240
Bharatiya Janata Party	Goa	2	441	1	240
Bharatiya Janata Party	Jammu and Kashmir	2	441	2	240
Bharatiya Janata Party	Tripura	2	441	2	240
Bharatiya Janata Party	Andaman and Nicobar Islands	1	441	1	240
Bharatiya Janata Party	Chandigarh	1	441	0	240
Bharatiya Janata Party	Ladakh	1	441	0	240
Bharatiya Janata Party	Manipur	1	441	0	240
Bharatiya Janata Party	Mizoram	1	441	0	240
Bharatiya Janata Party	Puducherry	1	441	0	240
Bharatiya Janata Party	Sikkim	1	441	0	240
Telugu Desam Party	Andhra Pradesh	17		16	
Janata Dal (United)	Bihar	16		12	
Shiv Sena	Maharashtra	15		7	
Pattali Makkal Katchi	Tamil Nadu	10		0	
Lok Janshakti Party (Ram Vilas)	Bihar	5		5	
Nationalist Congress Party	Maharashtra	4	5	1	1
Nationalist Congress Party	Lakshadweep	1	5	0	1
Bharath Dharma Jana Sena	Kerala	4		0	
Janata Dal (Secular)	Karnataka	3		2	
Tamil Maanila Congress (Moopanar)	Tamil Nadu	3		0	
Amma Makkal Munnetra Kazhagam	Tamil Nadu	2		0	
Apna Dal (Soneylal)	Uttar Pradesh	2		1	
Asom Gana Parishad	Assam	2		1	
Jana Sena Party	Andhra Pradesh	2		2	
National People's Party	Meghalaya	2		0	
Rashtriya Lok Dal	Uttar Pradesh	2		2	
All Jharkhand Students Union	Jharkhand	1		1	
Hindustani Awam Morcha	Bihar	1		1	
Naga People's Front	Manipur	1		0	
Nationalist Democratic Progressive Party	Nagaland	1		0	
Sikkim Krantikari Morcha	Sikkim	1		1	
Rashtriya Lok Morcha	Bihar	1		0	
Rashtriya Samaj Paksha	Maharashtra	1		0	
Suheldev Bharatiya Samaj Party	Uttar Pradesh	1		0	
United People's Party Liberal	Assam	1		1	
Independent	Tamil Nadu	1		0	
Total		541		293	

== Abki Baar 400 Paar ==
Abki Baar 400 Paar (This Time Surpassing 400) is a political slogan used by the Bharatiya Janata Party (BJP) and its leader, Prime Minister Narendra Modi for the 2024 general election. The slogan refers to the ambition of winning more than 400 out of 543 seats in the Lok Sabha.

The slogan has been used by the BJP in previous elections, including the 2019 general election with some changes. It has become a rallying cry for the party's supporters and a symbol of its political ambitions. Election analysts have said that the path for the BJP to achieve this goal will likely be by winning more seats in the south of India and West Bengal than in previous elections.

The party has held political rallies in multiple states with national leadership including Prime Minister Modi, Party President Nadda and Amit Shah campaigning actively.

PM Modi's remarks on INC's Wealth redistribution Survey sparked controversy in which he appeared to refer to Muslims as "infiltrators" and accused INC of planning to snatch the wealth of Hindus and distribute it to Muslim Infiltrators. It was heavily criticised by the Liberal Ecosystem of India and termed as Hatred Politics by the opposition. He criticized the concept of an inheritance tax that was strongly advocated by many Indian National Congress members and argued that it would further corruption. He has denied allegations of specifically targeting Muslims in a subsequent interview with Aaj Tak.

To counter the opposition's criticism on unemployment and inflation, the BJP has sought to highlight India's growing prominence on the world stage and highlighted the government's new social security programmes for the poor, such as providing free food grains under National Food Security Act, 2013 started under Dr. Manmohan Singh and health insurance to people in need. PM Narendra Modi highlighted his business-friendly policies and insisted that initiatives like Startup India and infrastructure projects have provided employment in the informal economy, which is not accounted for in the official unemployment statistics. He cited different numbers from the Indian National Congress to insist that unemployment had actually reduced in the past few years. Unlike the Congress' focus on increasing government jobs, the BJP promised to increase employment in manufacturing and entrepreneurship and support big businesses to generate employment.

BJP has focused extensively on the state of West Bengal in this election, where it is the main opposition party in the West Bengal Legislative Assembly, making alleged mass rapes by Trinamool Congress leader Sheikh Shahjahan in Sandeshkhali and alleged political violence by the state government its main issue when campaigning in this state. In their campaign, they have also criticized the Trinamool Congress for opposing the Citizenship (Amendment) Act, 2019, which is aimed at granting amnesty to Bengali Hindus, Christians, Buddhists, and Sikhs who fled Bangladesh during periods of intense persecution, as is supported by many international reports like the US Report on International Religious Freedom. Religious tensions have also increased recently between Hindus and Muslims in the state due to violence during the Hindu festival of Ram Navami where some Muslims objected to Hindu celebrations in Muslim-majority localities, which the BJP has blamed on Trinamool Congress's purported "Muslim appeasement". It won 18 out of 42 seats in the previous elections with 40% voteshare, and has claimed that it will cross 30 seats this time.

== Manifesto ==
The Bharatiya Janata Party started a campaign to gather public recommendations and suggestions for the advancement of the State and the country, which will be incorporated into the party's manifesto for the 2024 general elections.

A manifesto committee was formulated headed by Rajnath Singh. Nirmala Sitharaman acted as the convenor with Piyush Goyal as the co-convenor and senior leaders Shivraj Singh Chouhan, Vasundhara Raje and others as members.

BJP Manifesto was released on 14 April 2024 at 8:30 AM by Prime Minister Modi, BJP President JP Nadda, Rajnath Singh, Amit Shah and Nirmala Sitaraman at the BJP Headquarters.

The BJP proposed a 'GYAN' formula consisting of four segments - Garib (poor), Yuva (youth), Annadata (farmers) and Nari (women) in its manifesto. The Bharatiya Janata Party started a campaign to gather public recommendations and suggestions for the advancement of the State and the country, which will be incorporated into the party's manifesto titled 'Modi ki guarantee' for the 2024 general elections.

- Nari Shakti Vandan Adhiniyam: In order to assure women's representation in the legislatures of the states and the national leadership, the BJP pledged to systematically implement the Nari Shakti Vandan Adhiniyam.
- Lakhpati Didi: 3 crore rural women are being empowered to become "Lakhpati Didis".
- Free ration: Under the PM Garib Kalyan Anna Yojana, the BJP announced that it would give 80 crore citizens free rations for the next five years.
- Increasing MSP: on crops on a periodic basis was pledged in the manifesto. 6,000 rupees in annual financial support under the PM Kisan Samman Nidhi Yojana.
- Free electricity: The PM Surya Ghar Muft Bijli Yojana's free power for low-income homes was another pledge in the manifesto.
- For youngsters: BJP pledge to enact laws to stop the leak of competitive test question papers. Increase the startup ecosystem's reach to encourage youth entrepreneurship. Expanding job prospects in the manufacturing sector. Creating jobs through the development of infrastructure. Creating jobs through growing the tourism industry
- One Nation, One Election: In its manifesto, or Sankalp Patra, the BJP includes "One Nation, One Election," for the general elections. This implies that simultaneous elections for the Lok Sabha and all the state assemblies may take place in 2029.
- Uniform Civil Code: The manifesto includes the implementation of the Uniform Civil Code (UCC).
- Free Ayushman for all senior citizens: Under the Ayushman Bharat initiative, all senior citizens would be eligible for free, high-quality healthcare up to Rs 5 Lakhs.
- US$5 trillion economy: The BJP pledges to increase India's GDP to US$5 trillion by 2025 and $10 trillion by 2032. The Ministry of Finance has predicted that India's economy will rank third overall in the world. Earlier in 2018 and then again in 2019, Modi had stated the goal of the country reaching a GDP of US$5 trillion by 2022 and 2024 respectively, which didn't end up happening.
- United Nations Security Council: committed to securing India's UN Security Council permanent membership.
- Third-largest economic power: India will rank as the country with the third-largest GDP. India's rank rose from the 11th to the 5th largest GDP in the last ten years.
- Man on Moon and Bhartiya Antriksh Station: to establish a permanent Bhartiya Antriksh Station and send a man to the moon.

== Major promises in manifesto ==
1. Modi Ki Guarantee for Garib Parivar Jan - Continuing old schemes such as Pradhan Mantri Ujjwala Yojana, Ayushman Bharat Yojana, Har Ghar Jal, Pradhan Mantri Garib Kalyan Anna Yojana, Pradhan Mantri Awas Yojana, Pradhan Mantri Surya Ghar Muft Bijli Yojana, slum redevelopment.
2. Modi Ki Guarantee for Middle-Class Parivar Jan
3. Modi ki Guarantee for Nari Shakti - 3cr lakhpati didis
4. Modi ki Guarantee for Young Citizens - laws to prevent paper leaks, vibrant startup ecosystem
5. Modi ki Guarantee for Senior Citizens - Aayushman to senior citizens, teerth Yatra
6. Modi ki Guarantee for Kisan Samman
7. Modi ki Guarantee for Fishermen Families
8. Modi ki Guarantee for Shramik Samman
9. Modi ki Guarantee for MSME, Small Traders and Vishwakarmas
10. Modi ki Guarantee for Sabka Saath Sabka Vikas
11. Modi ki Guarantee for Vishwa Bandhu Bharat
12. Modi ki Guarantee for Surakshit Bharat
13. Modi ki Guarantee for Prosperous Bharat
14. Modi ki Guarantee for Global Manufacturing Hub
15. Modi ki Guarantee for World-Class Infrastructure
16. Modi ki Guarantee for Ease of Living in Cities
17. Modi ki Guarantee for Virasat Bhi, Vikas Bhi
18. Modi ki Guarantee for Good Governance
19. Modi ki Guarantee for Swastha Bharat
20. Modi ki Guarantee for Quality Education
21. Modi ki Guarantee for Sports Development
22. Modi Ki Guarantee for Balanced Regional Development
23. Modi ki Guarantee for Technology and Innovations
24. Modi ki Guarantee for Sustainable Bharat

== Results ==
State	Total Seats	Seats Won	Seat Change
Andaman & Nicobar Islands (UT)	1	1	▲1
Andhra Pradesh	25	3	▲3
Arunachal Pradesh	2	2	Steady
Assam	14	9	Steady
Bihar	40	12	▼5
Chandigarh (UT)	1	0	▼1
Chhattisgarh	11	10	▲1
Daman & Diu and Dadra & Nagar Haveli (UT)	2	1	Steady
Goa	2	1	Steady
Gujarat	26	25	▼1
Haryana	10	5	▼5
Himachal Pradesh	4	4	Steady
Jammu & Kashmir (UT)	5	2	Steady
Jharkhand	14	8	▼3
Karnataka	28	17	▼9
Kerala	20	1	▲1
Ladakh (UT)	1	0	▼1
Lakshadweep (UT)	1	0	Steady
Madhya Pradesh	29	29	▲1
Maharashtra	48	9	▼14
Manipur	2	0	▼1
Meghalaya	2	0	Steady
Mizoram	1	0	Steady
Nagaland	1	0	Steady
NCT of Delhi	7	7	Steady
Odisha	21	20	▲12
Puducherry (UT)	1	0	Steady
Punjab	13	0	▼2
Rajasthan	25	14	▼10
Sikkim	1	0	Steady
Tamil Nadu	39	0	Steady
Telangana	17	8	▲4
Tripura	2	2	Steady
Uttar Pradesh	80	33	▼29
Uttarakhand	5	5	Steady
West Bengal	42	12	▼6
Total	543	240	▼63

== See also ==
- National Democratic Alliance
- Bharatiya Janata Party
- 2024 Indian general election
