= National Food Security Act, 2013 =

Act of 2013 which enabled food security

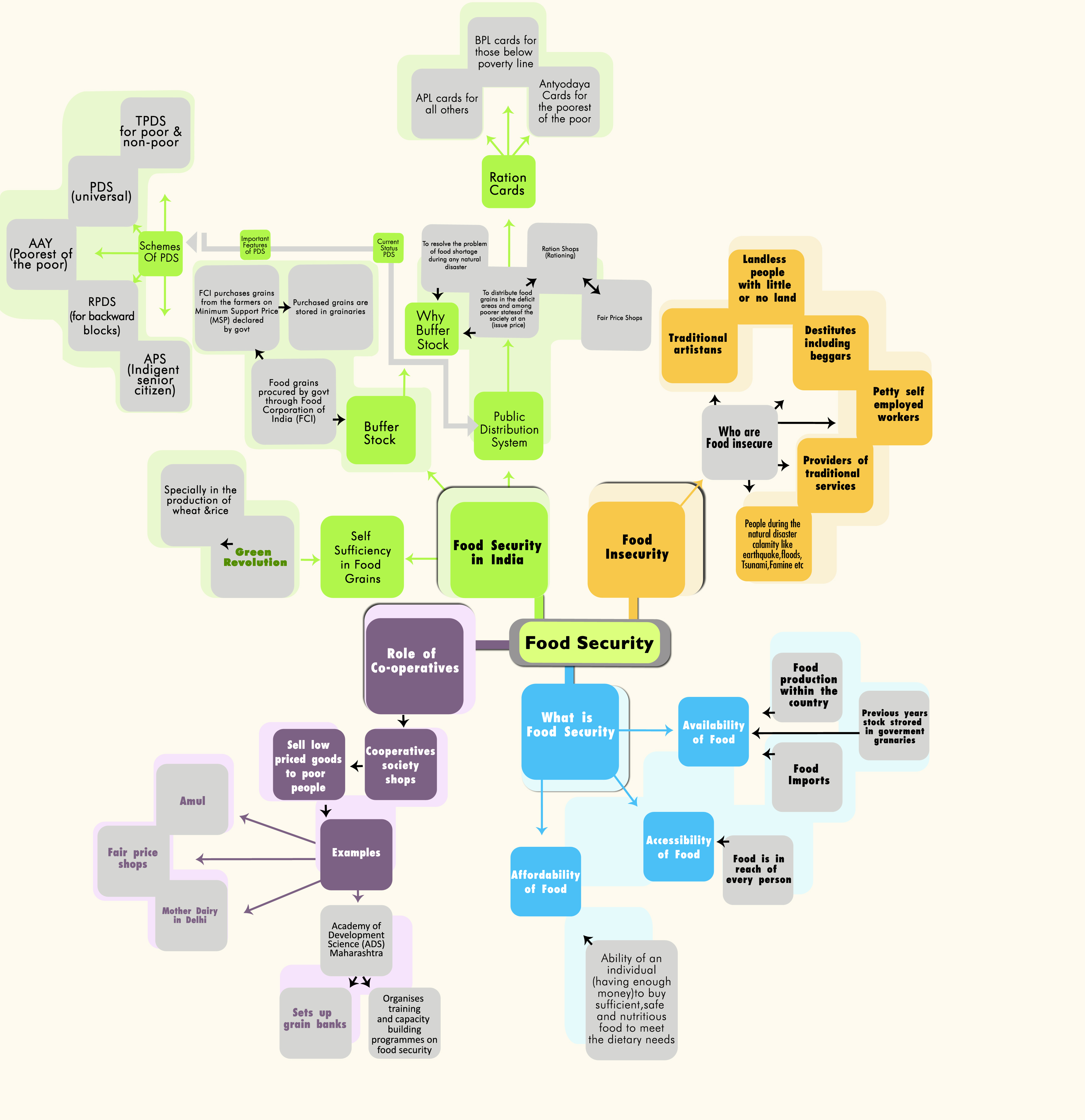
- Food security and insecurity in India

Government of India
- Enacted by: Government of India
- Signed: 10 September 2013; 13 years ago
- Status: In force

The National Food Security Act, 2013 is an Indian Act of Parliament which aims to provide subsidized food grains to approximately two thirds of the country's 1.4 billion people. It was signed into law on 12 September 2013, effective retroactively from 5 July 2013.

The National Food Security Act, 2013 (NFSA 2013) converts into legal entitlements for existing food security programmes of the Government of India. It includes the Midday Meal Scheme, Integrated Child Development Services scheme and the Public Distribution System. Further, the NFSA 2013 recognizes maternity entitlements. The Midday Meal Scheme and the Integrated Child Development Services Scheme are universal in nature whereas the PDS will reach about two-thirds of the population (75% in rural areas and 50% in urban areas).

Under the provisions of the Act, beneficiaries of the Public Distribution System (or, PDS) are entitled to 5 kilograms (11 lb) of cereals per person per month at the following prices:

- Rice at ₹3 (3.1¢ US) per kg
- Wheat at ₹2 (2.1¢ US) per kg
- Coarse grains (millet) at ₹1 (1.0¢ US) per kg.

Those with Antyodaya cards are entitled to 35 kg per month at the same prices as above.

The Act also includes the Midday Meal Scheme (MDM), the Integrated Child Development Services (ICDS) and maternity entitlements. While the MDM and ICDS were pre-existing schemes of the union government, universal maternity entitlements were created under the NFSA 2013 for the first time. In 2017, these entitlements were operationalized through the Pradhan Mantri Matru Vandana Yojana. Through the ICDS and MDM, pregnant women, lactating mothers, and children are eligible for daily free meals in government schools and Anganwadi centres.

The bill was hotly debated before its introduction in Parliament and after it was introduced in Parliament. It was introduced into India's parliament on 22 December 2011, promulgated as a presidential ordinance on 5 July 2013, and enacted into law on 12 September 2013. Government of Odisha announced implementation of the act in 14 districts from 17 November 2015. Government of Assam implemented the Act on 24 December 2015.

== Salient features ==
Coverage and entitlement under Targeted Public Distribution System (TPDS) : Up to 75% of the rural population and 50% of the urban population will be covered under TPDS, with uniform entitlement of 5 kg per person per month. However, since Antyodaya Anna Yojana (AAY) households constitute poorest of the poor, and were entitled to 35 kg per household per month, their entitlements will be protected at 35 kg per household per month.

State-wise coverage : Corresponding to the all India coverage of 75% and 50% in the rural and urban areas, State-wise coverage will be determined by the Central Government. Planning Commission has determined the State-wise coverage by using the NSS Household Consumption Survey data for 2011–12.

Subsidised prices under TPDS and their revision : Foodgrains under TPDS will be made available at subsidised prices of Rs. 3/2/1 per kg for rice, wheat and coarse grains for a period of three years from the date of commencement of the Act. In case any State's allocation under the Act is lower than their current allocation, it will be protected up to the level of average offtake under normal TPDS during last three years, at prices to be determined by the Central Government. Existing prices for APL households i.e. Rs. 6.10 per kg for wheat and Rs 8.30 per kg for rice has been determined as issue prices for the additional allocation to protect the average offtake during last three years

Identification of Households : Within the coverage under TPDS determined for each State, the work of identification of eligible households is to be done by States/UTs.

Nutritional Support to women and children : Pregnant women and lactating mothers and children in the age group of 6 months to 14 years will be entitled to meals as per prescribed nutritional norms under Integrated Child Development Services (ICDS) and Mid-Day Meal (MDM) schemes. Higher nutritional norms have been prescribed for malnourished children up to 6 years of age.

Maternity Benefit : Pregnant women and lactating mothers will also be entitled to receive maternity benefit of not less than Rs. 6,000.

Women Empowerment : Eldest woman of the household of age 18 years or above to be the head of the household for the purpose of issuing of ration cards.

Grievance Redressal Mechanism : Grievance redressal mechanism at the District and State levels. States will have the flexibility to use the existing machinery or set up separate mechanism.

Cost of intra-State transportation & handling of foodgrains and FPS Dealers' margin : Central Government will provide assistance to States in meeting the expenditure incurred by them on transportation of foodgrains within the State, its handling and FPS dealers’ margin as per norms to be devised for this purpose.

Transparency and Accountability : Provisions have been made for disclosure of records relating to PDS, social audits and setting up of Vigilance Committees in order to ensure transparency and accountability.

Food Security Allowance : Provision for food security allowance to entitled beneficiaries in case of non-supply of entitled foodgrains or meals.

Penalty : Provision for penalty on public servant or authority, to be imposed by the State Food Commission, in case of failure to comply with the relief recommended by the District Grievance Redressal Officer.

== Intent ==
The intent of the National Food Security Bill is spelled out in the Lok Sabha committee report, The National Food Security Bill, 2011, Twenty Seventh Report, which states, "Food security means availability of sufficient foodgrains to meet the domestic demand as well as access, at the individual level, to adequate quantities of food at affordable prices." The report adds, "The proposed legislation marks a paradigm shift in addressing the problem of food security – from the current welfare approach to a right based approach. About two thirds (approx 67%) of the population will be entitled to receive subsidized foodgrains under Targeted Public Distribution System. In a country where almost 40% of children are undernourished the importance of the scheme increases significantly."

== Scope ==
The Indian Ministry of Agriculture's Commission on Agricultural Costs and Prices (CACP) has referred to the Bill as the "biggest ever experiment in the world for distributing highly subsidized food by any government through a ‘rights based’ approach." The Bill extends coverage of the Targeted Public Distribution System, India's principal domestic food aid program, to two thirds of the population, or approximately 820 million people. Initially, the Lok Sabha Standing Committee on Food, Consumer Affairs and Public Distribution estimated a "total requirement of foodgrains, as per the Bill would be 61.55 million [metric] tons in 2012-13." The CACP calculated in May 2013, "...the requirement for average monthly PDS offtake is calculated as 2.3 mt for wheat (27.6 mt annually) and 2.8 mt for rice (33.6 mt annually)..." When volumes needed for the Public Distribution System and "Other Welfare Schemes" were aggregated, the CACP estimated rice and wheat requirements to total an "annual requirement of 61.2" million metric tons. However, the final version of the Bill signed into law includes on page 18 an annex, "Schedule IV", which estimates the total food grain allocation as 54.926 million metric tons.

The Standing Committee estimated that the value of additional food subsidies (i.e., on top of the existing Public Distribution System) "during 2012-13 works out to be...Rs.2409 crores," that is, 24.09 billion rupees, or about $446 million at the then-current exchange rate, for a total expenditure of 1.122 trillion rupees (or between $20 and $21 billion). However, the Commission on Agricultural Costs and Prices (CACP) calculated, "Currently, the economic cost of FCI for acquiring, storing and distributing foodgrains is about 40 percent more than the procurement price." The Commission added,

The stated expenditure of Rs 1,20,000 crore annually in NFSB is merely the tip of the iceberg. To support the system and the welfare schemes, additional expenditure is needed for the envisaged administrative set up, scaling up of operations, enhancement of production, investments for storage, movement, processing and market infrastructure etc. The existing Food Security Complex of Procurement, Stocking and Distribution- which NFSB perpetuates- would increase the operational expenditure of the Scheme given its creaking infrastructure, leakages & inefficient governance.

The Commission concluded that the total bill for implementation of the Bill "....may touch an expenditure of anywhere between Rs 125,000 to 150,000 crores," i.e., 1.25 to 1.5 trillion rupees. As of the implementation deadline of 4 October 2014, only 11 states had either implemented the Act or declared readiness to do so. On 28 November 2014, the Indian government announced, "Allocation of foodgrains to 11 States/Union Territories (UTs) namely, Bihar, Chandigarh, Chhattisgarh, Delhi, Haryana, Himachal Pradesh, Karnataka, Madhya Pradesh, Maharashtra, Punjab and Rajasthan has started under the Act..." and that the "remaining 25 States/UTs have not completed the preparatory measures required for implementation of the Act." The Indian government extended the deadline for implementation of the Act "by another six months, i.e. till 04.04.2015."

== Commentary ==
=== Critics ===
Criticism of the National Food Security Bill includes accusations of both political motivation and fiscal irresponsibility. One senior opposition politician, Murli Manohar Joshi, went so far as to describe the bill as a measure for "vote security" (for the ruling government coalition) rather than food security. Another political figure, Mulayam Singh Yadav, declared, "It is clearly being brought for elections...Why didn’t you bring this bill earlier when poor people were dying because of hunger?...Every election, you bring up a measure. There is nothing for the poor."

The report of the 33rd meeting of the Technical Advisory Committee on Monetary Policy stated, "...Food prices are still elevated and the food security bill will aggravate food price inflation as it will tilt supply towards cereals and away from other farm produce (proteins), which will raise food prices further...Members desired that the Reserve Bank impress on the government the need to address supply side constraints which are causing inflationary pressure, especially on the food front." Dr. Surjit S. Bhalla warned, "The food security bill...if implemented honestly, will cost 3 per cent of the GDP in its very first year." The writer Vivek Kaul noted,

The government’s estimated cost of food security comes at 11.10%...of the total receipts. The CACP’s estimated cost of food security comes at 21.5%...of the total receipts. Bhalla’s cost of food security comes at around 28% of the total receipts...Once we express the cost of food security as a percentage of the total estimated receipts of the government, during the current financial year, we see how huge the cost of food security really is.

The Indian Ministry of Agriculture's Commission on Agricultural Costs and Prices warned that enactment of the Bill could be expected to "induce severe imbalance in the production of oilseeds and pulses," and "...will create demand pressures, which will inevitably spillover to market prices of food grains. Furthermore, the higher food subsidy burden on the budget will raise the fiscal deficit, exacerbating macro level inflationary pressures." The Commission argued further that the Bill would restrict private initiative in agriculture, reduce competition in the marketplace due to government domination of the grain market, shift money from investments in agriculture to subsidies, and continue focus on cereals production when shifts in consumer demand patterns indicate a need to focus more on protein, fruits and vegetables.

India ranks 74 out of 113 major countries in terms of food security index. Though the available nutritional standard is 100% of the requirement, India lags far behind in terms of quality protein at 20% which needs to be tackled but no provision is made in the Act to subsidize the protein rich food products such as eggs, meat, fish, chicken, etc. India needs to concentrate on methods to improve the availability and affordability of protein rich food products using the latest technology without the need of additional land and water. Biogas or natural gas or methane produced from farm/agro/crop/domestic waste can also be used in addition to mined natural gas for producing protein rich cattle/fish/poultry/pet animal feed economically by cultivating Methylococcus capsulatus bacteria culture in a decentralized manner near to the rural / consumption areas with tiny land and water foot print.

=== Advocates ===
The bill was very widely viewed as a "pet project" of Indian National Congress(INC) President, Sonia Gandhi. Gandhi addressed Parliament the night of the August 2013 Lok Sabha vote on the bill, saying its passage would be a "chance to make history".

Former National Advisory Council member and development economist Professor Jean Drèze, reputedly one of the architects of the original, 2011 version of the bill, wrote, "...the Bill is a form of investment in human capital. It will bring some security in people’s lives and make it easier for them to meet their basic needs, protect their health, educate their children, and take risks." Professor Drèze dismissed opposition from business interests, saying, "Corporate hostility does not tell us anything except that the Food Bill does not serve corporate interests. Nobody is claiming that it does, nor is that the purpose of the Bill."

Minister of Consumer Affairs, Food, and Public Distribution K.V. Thomas stated in an interview,

This is no mean task, a task being accomplished in the second most populated country in the world. All the while, it has been a satisfying journey. The responsibility is not just of the Central Government but equally of the States/[Union Territories]. I am sure together we can fulfill this dream. The day is not far off, when India will be known the world over for this important step towards eradication of hunger, malnutrition and resultant poverty...By providing food security to 75 percent of the rural and 50 percent of the urban population with focus on nutritional needs of children, pregnant and lactating women, the National Food Security Bill will revolutionize food distribution system.

In a rebuttal to Dr. Surjit S. Bhalla, three economists responded, "...the food subsidy bill should roughly double and come to around 1.35% of GDP, which is still way less than the numbers he put out."

== Chhattisgarh Food Security Act ==
The Chhattisgarh Food Security Act, 2012 was enacted by the Government of Chhattisgarh. It was passed unopposed on 21 December 2012, by the State Assembly to ensure "access to adequate quantity of food and other requirements of good nutrition to the people of the State, at affordable prices, at all times to live a life of dignity."

The Act divides households into four groups — Antodaya, Priority, General and Excluded households.

The priority households will have monthly public distribution system (PDS) entitlement of 35 kg rice, wheat flour, pulses, gram and iodised salt at subsidised price. "The new act will make the acclaimed PDS more comprehensive. Nearly 90% of the provisions incorporated in the Act were already covered under the PDS", the then chief minister Raman Singh said. The new initiative will put a burden of ₹2,311 crore on the state exchequer. The act will not cover those who are income tax payees, own over 4 hectares of irrigated or 8 hectares of non-irrigated land in non-scheduled areas and who are liable to pay property tax in urban areas.

The Act benefits 4.2 million families living here. It will also cover families headed by a destitute, a widow or a disabled person. It will also take care of poor, children living in hostels/ashrams, pregnant women as well as those hit by disaster.

== See also ==
- Right to food
- Food security in India
- Public distribution system
- Ration card (India)
- Pradhan Mantri Garib Kalyan Anna Yojana
