= Amar Dukan =

Assamese linguistic term

Amar Dukan is an Assamese means 'Our Shop' to denote a notified Fair Price Shop in Assam. Besides providing the subsidized items under the Public Distribution System in India to the ration card holders, they also sell some other essential commodities at reasonable rates fixed by the state Food, Civil Supplies & Consumer Affairs Department to general consumers under an initiative of the state government to strengthen the Public Distribution System (PDS).

These specially converted Fair Price Shops started to function in many districts of the state in early 2011. This state government initiative was an attempt to tame the spiraling prices of essential commodities for the common people. Onions, potatoes, mustard oil, refined oil, soya oil, dal, atta, suji, maida, soap, milk, toothpaste, toothbrushes and hair oil are some of the about 21 notified items which are kept by the Fair Price Shop-keeper in the Amar Dukan.

Not all the FPS in Assam are notified for functioning as Amar Dukan, nor does every Amar Dukan sell all the notified items. There are also Amar Dukans on wheels.
