= Ration card (India) =

Ration Card

Ration cards are an official document issued by state governments in India to households that are eligible to purchase subsidised food grain from the Public Distribution System under the National Food Security Act (NFSA). They also serve as a common form of identification for many Indians.

Under the NFSA, all state governments in India have to identify households that are eligible to receive subsidised food grain from the Public Distribution System and provide them with ration cards. There are two types of ration cards under NFSA:

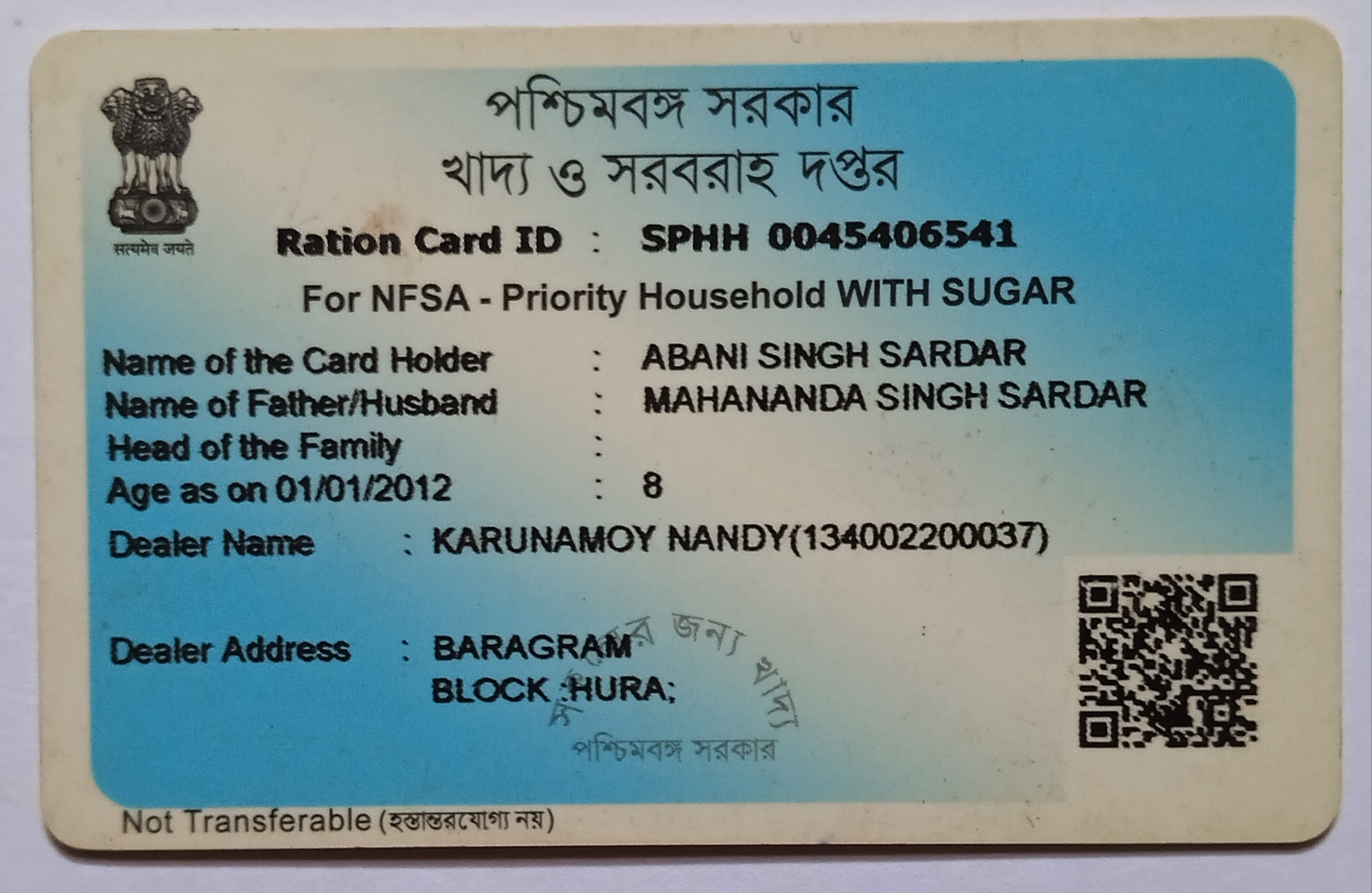
West Bengal digital ration card

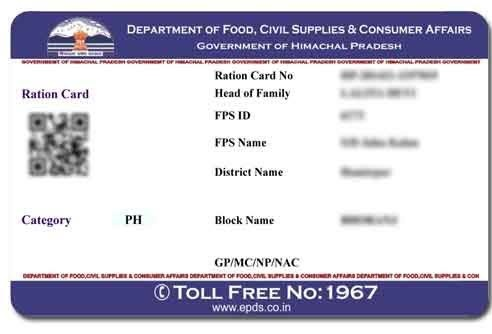
Model of Himachal Pradesh Digital Ration card

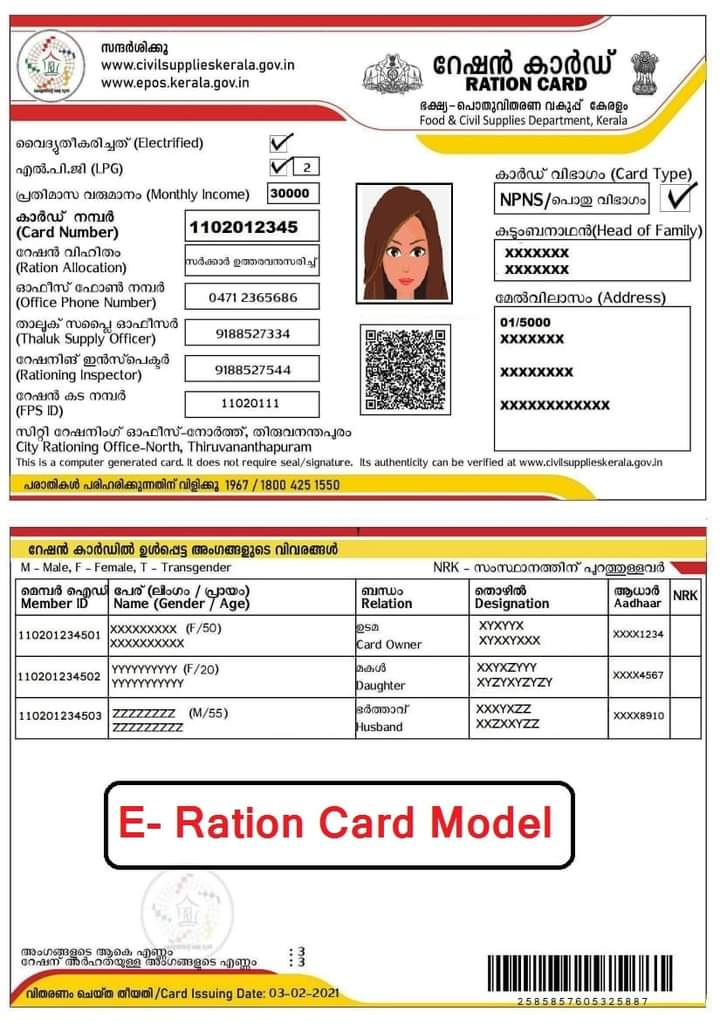
Model of E-Ration card issued by Kerala civil supplies department

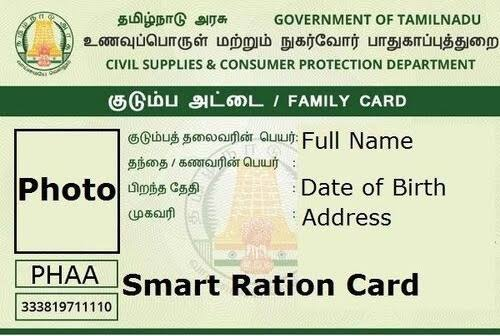
Model of smart ration card issued by Tamil Nadu civil supplies and consumer protection department

- Priority Household (PHH) ration cards are issued to households that meet the eligibility criteria set by their state government. Each priority household is entitled to 5 kilograms of food grain per member per month.
- Antyodaya Anna Yojana (AAY) ration cards are issued to the "poorest of poor" households. Each AAY household is entitled to 35 kilograms of food grain per month.

"One Nation, One Ration Card" is an Aadhaar-based national ration card portability scheme to ensure food security for all, including internal migrants within India, under which beneficiaries can purchase subsidised food anywhere in India. For example, a migrant worker can obtain his share of food at his current/migrant destination location while his family can obtain their share at their source/native home location.

== History ==
Before the NFSA was enacted, there were three types of ration cards:

- Above Poverty Line (APL) ration cards were issued to households living above the poverty line (as estimated by the Planning Commission). These households received 15 kg (33 lb) of food grain (based on availability) per month.
- Below Poverty Line (BPL) ration cards were issued to households living below the poverty line. These households received 25–35 kg (55–77 lb) of food grain.
- Antyodaya Anna Yojana (AAY) ration cards were issued to the "poorest of poor" households. These households received 35 kg (77 lb) of food grain.

== National ration card portability ==
"One Nation, One Ration Card", introduced in 2018, is the Aadhaar-based national ration card portability scheme to ensure food security for all including internal migrants within India. It used beneficiary's Aadhaar card for the online verification of the beneficiary. It enables migrant workers and their family members to access PDS benefits from any Fair Price Shop anywhere in the country, thus ensuring the food security through the inter-state portability of ration cards. By March 2021, 20 states have already joined the scheme and the rest were in the process of migrating to this scheme.

Earlier "Annavitran Portal" maintained data of distribution of foodgrains through E-PoS devices within a state, which allows a migrant worker or his family to obtain food from PDS Public Distribution System) outside their district but within their state. Now, "Integrated Management of Public Distribution System" (IM-PDS) portal has been introduced, which will work in combination with Annavitran Portal to enable the inter-state portability of ration cards under which migrant worker can buy his/her share of food in their migrant destination location, and the rest of his/her family members can buy subsidised foodgrains from their FPS (Food Provision Store) back home. This prevents leakages, fraud, and enhances the implementation of FPS (National Food Security Act, 2013). PoS (Point of Sales) machines have been installed across all FPSs and in the country and Annavitran Portal has been seeded with Aadhaar.

== Ration card application Process ==
Section 10 (1a and 1b) of the National Food Security Act requires states governments to identify households to be covered under priority and AAY categories within a year from the commencement of NFSA and place the list of identified eligible households in the public domain. After the enactment of NFSA, all state governments developed a set of eligibility criteria to identify households for issuing ration cards. Based on this eligibility criteria, new ration cards were issued. In some states (such as Bihar and Madhya Pradesh), the state governments used existing data (such as the Socio-Economic Caste Census) to identify households and issue new ration cards. In other states (such as Chhattisgarh and Odisha), eligible households had to apply for new ration cards through a self-declaration process. In Jharkhand, the online ration card application process may require applicants to upload a photograph of their house (House Image) during registration. Applicants applying through the state's online Ration Card Management System (RCMS/ERCMS) should upload the house photograph in the designated field, along with the other required information and documents. Applicants should follow the file format and size requirements displayed on the application portal.When applying to add a new family member to an existing ration card in Jharkhand through the state's online Ration Card Management System (RCMS/ERCMS), applicants may also be required to upload a photograph of the new member. A caste certificate may also be required, depending on the applicant's category and the applicable documentation requirements. Applicants should ensure that all uploaded documents meet the specifications provided on the official application portal.

== Elimination of fake ration cards ==
On March 1, 2000, the Planning Commission identified 6.52 crore BPL(Below poverty line) families, including 2.43 crore Antyodaya Anna Yojana families, at the 1993-94 poverty line threshold, for the Central Government's Targeted Public Distribution Scheme. However, in 2009, the number of BBL ration cards was issued by the State Government and Union Territories was 10.96 crore.

By linking ration cards with Aadhaar cards, 5.8 crore fake ration cards have been eliminated and 20.4 crore BBL ration cards are in regular use.

Earlier, prior to the digitisation, many problems with the PDS ration system exist, there are millions of ineligible and fraudulent ration cards; at the same time, millions of poor families have no ration card. PDS shop owners in collusion with government officials diverted the subsidized food supply and petroleum to the black market. Card numbers are inflated by those held under false or duplicate names, in the names of dead or fake people .

Following initiatives have been taken to weed out the fake ration card and to prevent fraud.

=== Aadhaar-enabled beneficiary ===
The bank accounts and ration cards of eligible beneficiaries are linked to their Aadhaar numbers. A bank account can be enabled as AeBA by seeding (linking) it with an Aadhaar number. Seeding makes mapping information stored on the NPCI payment gateway that facilitates the subsidy payment. Seeding helps identify genuine and eligible beneficiaries and prevents duplicate and non-existent persons from registering. Users can link a bank account as self-service option through ATM kiosks, the Internet, bank websites, telephone, or by providing a copy of the Aadhaar letter to a bank.

Prior to Aadhaar, the issues plaguing and derailing social security programs in India were caused by corrupt officials and middlemen manipulating paper records and stand-alone databases of social security services. Due to lack of a unique identifier like Aadhaar, stand-alone databases cannot detect and eliminate duplicate or fraudulent beneficiaries. The most common modus operandi adopted to inflate the beneficiary list is by inserting duplicate entries, non-existent names, and the names of dead and non-eligible people. Attempts are then made to steal the social security benefits money, depriving genuine claimants.

=== Aadhaar-enabled DBT ===
Aadhaar-enabled service delivery (AeSD) prevents corruption in retail by directly crediting benefit money into the beneficiary's bank account; this is called Direct Benefit Transfer (DBT). It eliminates middlemen and fraudulent, ineligible beneficiaries. In this way, Aadhaar saves billions of rupees of public money annually and enables poor people access to social security benefits.

Various financial and other services are being Aadhaar-enabled, called Aadhaar-enabled Service Delivery (AeSD), in a phased manner. By 1 January 2014, half of India (289 districts across various states) had been covered by DBT for subsidized LPG. By August 2013, 6.3 million duplicate LPG connections were detected by Aadhaar and were cancelled. The national government saved $1 billion on reduced imports by mid-2013.

=== Aadhaar-enabled eligibility check ===
Applicant eligibility is checked by comparing the service delivery database with other databases. For example, PDS kerosene eligibility is checked by comparing the PDS database with the LPG database. The subsidy on kerosene allocation is reduced if the LPG subsidy is detected for that household.

Ration card eligibility is cross-checked with other related, Aadhaar-linked databases. This approach is designed to improve the audit trail, add efficiency and prevent corruption. It results in direct benefit access for eligible people and annually saves billions of rupees from corruption. Tangible benefits became visible from 2014; a report by UBS published in January 2014 showed Aadhaar DBT can save 1.2% of GDP.

The finance minister informed the Parliament during Vote on Account that as of 31 January 2014, under DBT ₹33 billion for 21 million LPG subsidy and ₹6.28 billion (628 crores) have been transferred for various social programs in 5.4 million transactions.

=== e-Ration Card Services ===
With the help of e-Ration service, applicants can obtain ration cards and check their costs and food grain availability online. This will help end the corrupt practice of holding back rations and ensure cards reach the needy. Aadhaar card holders can apply for e-ration cards. The Department of Food Supplies and Consumer Affairs website provides eligibility details for the food security plan. This service was first introduced in Delhi. Later this has been followed by the state Governments of Tamil Nadu, Kerala

== Impact of AADHAR based technology in fraud prevention ==
=== National summary: 2018-2021 1.29 cr fake cards eliminated ===
Between 2018 and March 2021 3-year period, at least 1.29 crore (12.9 million) fake ration cards were eliminated based on the biometric enabled AADHAR card seeding of the ration card database which had several times more beneficiaries as each ration card has several family members on it. Seeding ration cards with AADHAR ensured uniqueness of beneficiaries in Public Distribution System (PDS). Nation-wide 92% ration cards, have been seeded with at least one member of the household's AADHAR number. Number of fake ration cards weeded out were 93,78,789 in Uttar Pradesh, 20,37,947 in Maharashtra, followed by Madhya Pradesh (3,54,535), Haryana (2,91,926), Punjab (2,87,474), Delhi (2,57,886) and Assam (1,70,057). 19,410 actions were taken against FPS licenses which were either suspended, cancelled, sent show-cause notices, or FIRs lodged by States/UTs, this included 13,905 in Uttar Pradesh, 3,139 in Kerala.

=== PDS ration in Andhra Pradesh ===
Ration cards and corresponding bank accounts of the heads of families (HoF) have been linked with Aadhaar Numbers of family members to prevent retail corruption. When a beneficiary buys rations from a PDS shop, their eligibility is authenticated through an Aadhaar KYC handheld device. The PDS computer system reads out the quantity eligibility and balance of each item in the local language. After purchase, the balance quantities for that month are read out. The buyer pays the open market rate to the PDS shop. A computer prints a receipt showing all items purchased, balance items, money paid and subsidy amount. The subsidy amount is credited to the beneficiary's bank account under the DBT program. Because the PDS computer system is connected to a central server, beneficiaries can buy ration items from any PDS shop. The system is flexible and provides access and options to the public that was not seen before in PDS.

The state government is preparing to replace about 1,29,00,000 ration cards with the new AP rice card. According to Food and Civil Supplies Andhra Pradesh, around 18 lakh beneficiaries have been found suspicious. The beneficiary for the new AP Ration Card has been identified by a volunteer through door-to-door survey. Now the beneficiary has been identified as the beneficiary will get the YSR Rice Card. While submitting application for Ration Card in Andhra pradesh, Form D1 needs to be submitted to the nearest rationing office.

=== m-Ration Mitra in Madhya Pradesh ===
M-Ration Mitra is a smartphone application that allows people to register for Ration cards through mobile phones, which essentially fast tracks the whole process exponentially. This is primarily done to make sure that those below the Poverty Line do not have to wait for the procedures before getting access to food grains. Through the M-Ration Mitra application, consumers can avail food grains at ration shops and can also receive notification regarding the status of the POS machine in ration shops. They can even receive the address of the nearest ration shops and the benefits of the M-Ration card can be availed by anyone in the family. The M-Ration Mitra also serves as a consumer complaint forum, which will allow consumers to complain about the closure of shops, short-weighing, or non-distribution of certain food items.

== See also ==
Ration card related topics

- India Stack
- Public distribution system (India)
- National Food Security Act, 2013
- Pradhan Mantri Garib Kalyan Anna Yojana
- Aadhaar
- Aadhaar-enabled service delivery
- Direct Benefit Transfer
- Subsidies
- Public welfare in India

Common man empowerment related topics

- DigiLocker (easier access to online identity proof and services)
- Pradhan Mantri Awas Yojana (affordable housing for all)
- Saubhagya electrification scheme (electrification of all houses)
- Swachh Bharat (toilet for all houses)
- Ujjwala Yojana (clean cooking gas connections for all)

== State Wise Ration Card Print ==
- State wise Ration Card Print Portal
