= Pradhan Mantri Matri Vandana Yojana =

Indian maternity benefit programme

- Country: India
- Prime Minister(s): Shri Narendra Modi
- Ministry: Ministry of Women and Child Development
- Launched: 2010
- Website: https://pmmvy.wcd.gov.in/

Pradhan Mantri Matru Vandana Yojana (PMMVY) (transl. Prime Minister's Maternity Welfare Scheme), previously known as the Indira Gandhi Matritva Sahyog Yojana, is a maternity benefit program run by the government of India. It was originally launched in 2010 and renamed in 2017. The scheme is implemented by the Ministry of Women and Child Development. It is a conditional cash transfer scheme for pregnant and lactating women of 19 years of age or above for the first live birth.

It provides a partial wage compensation to women for wage-loss during childbirth and childcare and to provide conditions for safe delivery and good nutrition and feeding practices. In 2013, the scheme was brought under the National Food Security Act, 2013 to implement the provision of cash maternity benefit of ₹6,000 (US$62) stated in the Act.

Presently, the scheme is implemented on a pilot basis in 53 selected districts across India and proposals are under consideration to scale it up to 200 additional 'high burden districts' in 2015–16. The eligible beneficiaries would receive the incentive given under the Janani Suraksha Yojana (JSY) for Institutional delivery and the incentive received under JSY would be accounted towards maternity benefits so that on an average a woman gets ₹6,000 (US$62)

The scheme, rechristened Maternity benefits programme is set to cover the entire nation. Prime Minister Narendra Modi, in his 2017 New Year's Eve speech, announced that the scheme will be scaled up to cover 650 districts of the country. The announcement assumes significance as India accounts for 17% of all maternal deaths in the world. The country's maternal mortality ratio is pegged at 97 per 100,000 live births, whereas infant mortality is estimated at 28 per 1,000 live births. Among the primary causes of high maternal and infant mortality are poor nutrition and inadequate medical care during pregnancy and childbirth.

== History ==
The scheme's name has undergone two changes. In 2014, "Indira Gandhi" was dropped from the scheme name. In 2017, "Pradhan Mantri" was added making it Pradhan Mantri Matri Vandana Yojana (PMMVY).

== Timeline ==
Year	Implemented Districts
2010	50
2015	200~
2017	650 (Countrywise)

== Objectives ==
Objectives:

- Promoting appropriate practice, care and institutional service utilization during pregnancy, delivery and lactation
- Encouraging the women to follow (optimal) nutrition and feeding practices, including early and exclusive breastfeeding for the first six months; and
- Providing cash incentives for improved health and nutrition to pregnant and lactating mothers.

IGMSY provides financial assistance as grant-in-aid to state governments.

== About PMMVY 2.0 ==
The Ministry of Women and Child Development introduced PMMVY SOFT MIS on March 17, 2023. It aims to empower women to independently access and apply for the scheme benefits through the program's website. The Ministry has provided clear and comprehensive guidance on how to navigate the website and apply for these benefits. To gain a thorough understanding of the entire process, you can either visit the website or refer to the simplified explanation below.

To access the official PMMVY website, use this URL: Pradhan Mantri Matru Vandana Yojana – Home . Look for the login section in the upper right corner.

1. Input your 10-digit mobile number and click "Verify."

2. Provide your name and select your relationship with the beneficiary.

3. An OTP will be sent to your registered mobile number; enter it.

4. Following this, you will be directed to the PMMVY citizen home page.

5. Fill out the Beneficiary Application Form, including all personal details, and click "Submit."

6. After submission, you will find an option to Track the Application Status, allowing you to monitor the progress of your application.

== Eligibility conditions and conditionalities ==
Originally, the scheme was brought under the National Food Security Act, 2013 to implement the provision of cash maternity benefit of ₹6,000 (US$84) stated in the Act.[2] Then, all pregnant women of 19 years of age and above were eligible for conditional cash transfer benefits of ₹5,000 (US$52) to paid in three installments, except those who receive paid maternity leave. After the implementation of National Food Security Act the amount has been revised to ₹6,000 (US$62) to be paid in two installments of ₹3,000 (US$31) each. The cash transfers under the Scheme are subject to the following conditions:

- The first transfer (at pregnancy trimester) of ₹1,000 (US$10) requires the mother to:
  - Register pregnancy at the Anganwadi centre (AWC) upon realising conception has occurred
  - Attend at least one prenatal care session and taking Iron-folic acid tablets and TT1 (tetanus toxoid injection), and
  - Attend at least one counseling session at the AWC or healthcare centre.
- The second transfer (six months of conception) of ₹2,000 (US$21) requires the mother to:
  - Attend at least one prenatal care session and TT2
- The third transfer (three and a half months after delivery) of ₹2,000 (US$21) requires the mother to:
  - Register the birth
  - Immunize the child with OPV and BCG at birth, at six weeks and at ten weeks
  - Attend at least two growth monitoring sessions within three months of delivery
- Additionally the scheme requires the mother to:
  - Exclusively breastfeed for six months and introduce complementary feeding as certified by the mother,
  - Immunize the child with OPV and DPT
  - Attend at least two counseling sessions on growth monitoring and infant and child nutrition and feeding between the third and sixth months after delivery.

However, studies suggest that these eligibility conditions and other conditionalities exclude many women from receiving their entitlements.

== See also ==
- Ministry of Women and Child Development (India)
