= Pradhan Mantri Garib Kalyan Anna Yojana =

India's food security program for the poor

Pradhan Mantri Garib Kalyan Anna Yojana (PMGKAY; transl. Prime Minister's Food Security Scheme for the Poor) is a food security welfare scheme announced by the Government of India on March 26, 2020, during the COVID-19 pandemic in India. The program is operated by the Department of Food and Public Distribution under the Ministry of Consumer Affairs, Food and Public Distribution. But the nodal ministry is Ministry of Finance.The scale of this welfare scheme makes it the largest food security program in the world, benefiting 81.35 crore people (approximately 56.81% population) in India.

The scheme aims to feed the poorest citizens of India by providing grain through the Public Distribution System, to all the priority households (ration card holders and those identified by the Antyodaya Anna Yojana scheme). PMGKAY provides 5 kg of rice or wheat (according to regional dietary preferences) per person and 1 kg of dal to each family holding a ration card. The Union Budget 2022-23 allocated a sum of Rs. 2 Lakh Crores for the scheme in fiscal year 2022-23.

== Statistics ==
Phase	Month-Year	Project Fund (Cr.)	Quantity of food planned to be served(Lakh Metric Ton)	Quantity of food served (Lakh Metric Ton)	No. of Beneficiaries (Cr.)
I	Apr-June 2020	106000	321	298.8	75
II	July-Nov 2020	106000	321	298.8	75
III	May–June 2021	25000	79.46	75.2	75.18
IV	July-Nov 2021	62380	198.78	186.72	In July 2021, 74.93; In Aug 2021, 74.95; In Sep 2021, 75.01; In Oct 2021, 74.55; In Nov 2021, 74.04
V	Dec 21 - Mar 22	53342	159	115.03	In Dec 2021, 73.60; In Jan 2022, 74.50; In Feb 2022, 63.10; In Mar 2022, 19.57
VI	Apr - Sep, 2022	80000	244		Approximately 80crores
VII	Oct - Dec, 2022	44762	122.76		
Total	28 Months	3.91 Lakhs crore ~	1118 LMT~		Approximately 80Crores

Under the National Food Security Act, 2013, 35 kg of food grains were provided to families, Whom holding Antyodaya ration cards and 5 kg food grains per person to families holding Priority distribution cards at subsidized rates.

During the COVID-19 pandemic, Prime Minister Narendra Modi announced that an additional 5 kg of food grains would be provided for free of cost to each person in the household those holding an Antyodaya and Priority ration card. where Anthyodaya and Priority ration card holders had been receiving subsidized food grains under the Prime Minister's Food Security Scheme for the Poor along with the regular distribution of food grains. Under PMGKAY, 1121 metric tonnes of food grains were distributed in seven phases from April 2020 to December 2022 at a cost of Rs 3.9 lakh crore.

The Central Government, under the Pradhan Mantri Garib Kalyan Anna Yojana (PMGKAY), has decided to continue providing free food grains till December 2028. This includes Antyodaya Anna Yojana (AAY) households and Priority Households (PHH) beneficiaries.The schemes extend to 57% of the population (813.5 million out of approximately 1.43 billion in 2024). The entitlement remains 35 kg of food grains per AAY household per month and 5 kg of food grains per person per month for PHH beneficiaries.

The annual food subsidy borne by Government of India towards distribution of food grains to AAY households and PHH beneficiaries, Other Welfare Schemes and Tide Over is to the tune of Rs. 2.13 lakh crore. Assuming growth in Economic cost, the Central Government will spend approx Rs11.80 lakh crore during the period of five years from January 2024 to December 2028 as food subsidy under PMGKAY, to remove the financial burden of the poor and the poorest of the poor.

== Overview ==
The scheme was initially launched on 26 March 2020 with an announcement by the Prime Minister of India, Narendra Modi, who announced the program as part of the existing Pradhan Mantri Garib Kalyan Yojana welfare initiative in his first address to the nation during the COVID-19 pandemic. Initially, the scheme was launched for the period from April—June 2020, with a cost of ₹1.70 lakh crore (US$20 billion) to the exchequer.

The scheme was further extended to November 2020 in a later address to the nation by Modi. By the end of May 2020, the food ministry estimated that the program had reached 740 million beneficiaries. Praising the program, a government official noted the coverage under the welfare scheme as "impressive". Another union minister commented on the scheme, saying: "This will ensure no one sleeps hungry in the country..."

As the initiative was due to expire by the end of June 2020, ten states in the country requested an extension of the time frame. This was confirmed by Modi in his sixth address to the nation since the onset of COVID-19 in India. With consideration to the upcoming festival season in India, Modi announced the extension of PMGKAY up to November 2020, which according to government estimates would benefit 800 million beneficiaries. He further noted that the program would incur an additional expenditure of ₹90,000 crore (US$11 billion) for its extension. The scale of the scheme makes it the biggest food security program in the world. Reporting on Modi's speech, the Financial Express claimed the scheme "could feed 2.5 times the US population, 12 times the UK population, and twice the European Union's population". Modi thanked the "hardworking farmers and honest taxpayers" in his speech for the success of the scheme. Immediately after Modi's announcement, the Home Minister of India, Amit Shah, called a meeting of the Group of Ministers to ensure the smooth implementation of the scheme.

In response to the states' request for an extension of the food security program, Minister for Food Supplies Ram Vilas Paswan further commented that another flagship scheme of the government, "One Nation - One Ration Card", is being planned and scheduled to be launched in March 2021. The new proposed scheme is devised to cater especially to migrant laborers to help them receive subsidized grain from any "fair price" shops across the country.

== Initial problems in distribution due to lockdown and corruption at ground level ==
Data released after PM Modi's speech from the Ministry of Consumer Affairs, Food and Public Distribution revealed that initially in many staates the free grain failed to be distributed to intended recipients due to nationwide lockdown, strict restrictions on movement, corruption among food dealers and village council members. Both Goa and Telangana distributed no grain at all with a further 11 (Andhra Pradesh, Gujarat, Jharkhand, Ladakh, Maharashtra, Meghalaya, Odisha, Sikkim, Tamil Nadu, and Tripura) distributing less than 1% of their allocated amount in April and May 2020. A further six (Bihar, Gujarat, Maharashtra, Tamil Nadu, Sikkim, and Ladakh) also distributed zero grain in June 2020.

Ram Vilas Paswan, the Union Minister of Consumer Affairs, Food and Public Distribution said that "Some states are not distributing grain to the poor. [We] have problem in providing foodgrain to states, so when it is being given free, I don't understand the problem in distribution. We are taking this issue seriously". The Food Secretary Sudhanshu Pandey blamed a lack of migrant workers for the failure to distribute grains. The director of Oxfam India, Ranu Bhogal, blamed corruption among food dealers and village council members.

However, the situation improved significantly from the last quarter of 2020, when procurement and distribution reached an all-time high and have remained at that level ever since.

To curb leakage and corruption in grain distribution at the ground level, the government implemented Aadhaar linkage to ration cards along with fingerprint and OTP-based authentication during distribution which ensures that only eligible beneficiaries receive the grains, while all duplicate or fraudulent ration cards are deactivated from the system. This overhaul of the system, which serves 80.6 crore beneficiaries, has led to the removal of 5.8 crore fake ration cards through Aadhaar-based authentication and electronic Know Your Customer (eKYC) verification.

According to the Union Food Ministry, nearly all 20.4 crore ration cards have been digitised, with 99.8 per cent linked to Aadhaar and 98.7 per cent beneficiaries' credentials verified through biometric authentication.

== Success ==
As per a study conducted by International Monetary Fund, published on 5 April 2020, found that extreme poverty (less than PPP USD 1.9 per person per day) in India is less than 1 per cent in 2019 and it remained at that level even during the COVID-19 pandemic year 2020. Prime Minister Narendra Modi's food security scheme, the Pradhan Mantri Garib Kalyan Anna Yojana, has been critical in preventing any increase in extreme poverty levels in India during the COVID-19 pandemic. The new IMF paper, Pandemic, Poverty, and Inequality: Evidence from India, presented estimates of poverty (extreme poverty PPP USD 1.9 and PPP USD3.2) and consumption inequality in India for each of the years 2004-5 through the pandemic year 2020-21. These estimates include, for the first time, the effect of food subsidies on poverty and inequality. Extreme poverty was as low as 0.8 per cent in the pre-pandemic year 2019, and food transfers were instrumental in ensuring that it remained at that low level in the pandemic year 2020. Post-food subsidy inequality at .294 is now very close to its lowest level of 0.284 observed in 1993/94. A low level of extreme poverty in two consecutive years, and one including the pandemic, can be considered as an elimination of extreme poverty. The PMGKAY was critical in preventing any increase in extreme poverty levels in India and the doubling of food entitlements worked substantially in terms of absorbing the COVID-19 induced income shocks on the poor, said the IMF report.Under the PMGKAY, free food grain is provided to those in need. The scheme was kickstarted in March 2020 amid the COVID-19 pandemic in the country and it was extended till December 2028. The scheme entails providing 5 kg foodgrains per person per month, over and above the regular monthly NFSA foodgrains. The benefit is being provided to those covered under the National Food Security Act (NFSA) [Antodaya Anna Yojana and Priority Households] including those covered under Direct Benefit Transfer (DBT). The government had in March 2020 announced the distribution of additional free-of-cost foodgrains (rice/wheat) to about 80 crore National Food Security Act (NFSA) beneficiaries in the wake of the situation created by COVID-19 so that the vulnerable households do not suffer on account of non-availability of adequate foodgrains. The pandemic shock is largely a temporary income shock, said the IMF report, adding that a temporary fiscal policy intervention was the fiscally appropriate way to absorb a large part of the shock. Consumption growth (an important determinant of poverty) was found to be higher in 2014-19 than the robust growth observed in 2004-2011. The paper also examined, in some detail, the plausibility of the results contained in the NSS consumer expenditure survey of 2017-18.

The Central Government, under the Pradhan Mantri Garib Kalyan Anna Yojana (PMGKAY) has decided to continue to provide free food grains to about 81.35 crore beneficiaries (i.e. Antyodaya Anna Yojana (AAY) households and Priority Households (PHH) beneficiaries) for a period of next five years with effect from 1 January 2024, as per their entitlement (i.e. 35 kg of food grains per AAY household per month and 5 kg of food grains per person per month in case of Priority Household) till December 2028.

The schemes extend to 57% of the population (813.5 million out of approximately 1.43 billion in 2024). More than 750 million beneficiaries have received foodgrains every month during implementation of PMGKAY in FY 2020-21, 2021-22. Similar distribution pattern is expected in the foodgrains distribution under PMGKAY implementing during FY 2022-23. Based on concurrent evaluation reports received from Monitoring Institutes (MIs) from 30 States/UTs, 98% of the surveyed households reported to receive their full entitlement under PMGKAY.

== See also ==
- Public Distribution System (India)
- Ration card (India)
- National Food Security Act, 2013
