= Pradhan Mantri Surya Ghar Muft Bijli Yojana =

Indian government solar scheme

Pradhan Mantri Surya Ghar Muft Bijli Yojana (PMSG)
- Motto: To increase solar rooftop capacity and empower 1 crore residential households to generate their own electricity
- Country: India
- Prime Minister(s): Narendra Modi
- Ministry: Ministry of New and Renewable Energy
- Key people: R. K. Singh (29 February 2024 - 9 June 2024); Pralhad Joshi (10 June 2024 - present)
- Launched: 29 February 2024; 2 years ago
- Budget: Rs. 75,021 crore
- Status: Active
- Website: pmsuryaghar.gov.in

PM Surya Ghar Muft Bijli Yojana is a scheme launched by the Government of India in its 2024-25 budget for rooftop solar plant project with an investment of over 75,000 crore rupees to provide solar power for about 1 crore households and to provide them 300 units of free electricity every month.

== History ==
Prime Minister of India, Narendra Modi announced this scheme on February 13, 2024. Under PMSG Yojana, beneficiaries receive a fixed one time subsidy amount from government directly into their bank accounts. Beneficiaries are also eligible for bank loans at concessional rates. A national online portal has been created for this scheme to promote it at the grassroot level, urban local bodies and panchayats will be encouraged to promote rooftop solar systems in their areas. The scheme aims to increase income, reduce electricity bills and create employment opportunities for people.

== Eligibility ==
The criteria for application under this scheme includes citizenship of India, the ownership of legal house with sufficient space at rooftops to enable installation of solar panels. Furthermore valid electricity connection and the criteria for applicants that they must not have availed any other solar panel subsidy earlier from the government.

Average monthly power consumption (units)	Suitable rooftop solar plant capacity (kW)	Subsidy support
0 - 150	1 - 2	Rs 30,000 to Rs 60,000
150 - 300	2 - 3	Rs 60,000 to Rs 78,000
>300	Above 3	Rs. 78,000

== Further information ==
Feature	Details
Name of the scheme	PM Surya Ghar Muft Bijli Yojana
Launch date	15 February 2024
State	Various states of India
Started by	Narendra Modi
Beneficiary	1 crore domestic users
Purpose	Providing free electricity to households by installing solar panels
Registration process	Check the detailed process by visiting the scheme website
Official website	PM Surya Ghar: Muft Bijli Yojana Registration: https://registration.pmsuryaghar.gov.in/home/survey

== Registration process ==
The registration process under PM Surya Ghar Muft Bijli Yojana is simple and streamlined. The process is completed by filling the requisite forms on the official website of the scheme. After the eligibility is verified and the scheme is approved for the applicant , the solar panels are installed by the vendors registered with government and subsidy is credited in applicants bank account within 30 days. Added information regarding the role of domestic solar companies in the implementation and pan-India reach of the scheme, supported by a trade news reference.

== See also ==
- Solar power in India
- Renewable energy in India
- Electricity sector in India
- Energy policy of India
- Cost of electricity by source
- Growth of photovoltaics
