= Public Distribution System (India) =

Indian food security system

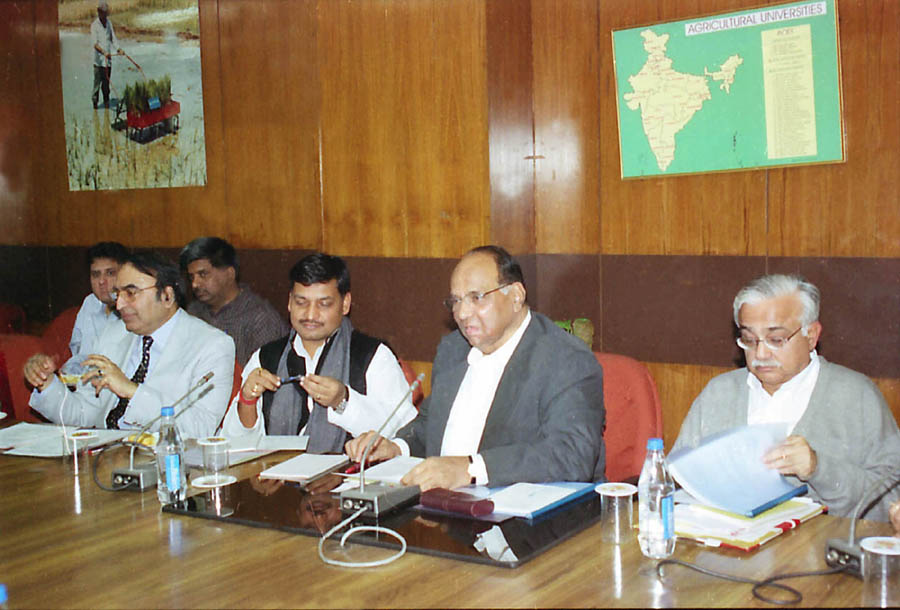
Then Indian agriculture minister Sharad Pawar meets representatives of the All India Fair Price Shop Dealers Federation in 2004.

The Public Distribution System (PDS) is a food security system that was established by the Government of India under the Ministry of Consumer Affairs, Food and Public Distribution to distribute food and non-food items to India's poor at subsidised rates. Major commodities distributed include staple food grains, such as wheat, rice, sugar and essential fuels like kerosene, through a network of fair price shops (also known as ration shops) established in several states across the country. Food Corporation of India, a government-owned corporation, procures and maintains the PDS.

As of June 2022, India has the largest stock of grain in the world besides China, the government spends ₹750 billion. Food is procured from the net food surplus states, mainly from the smaller but richer states of Haryana and Punjab, which provide 70-90% of wheat & 28-44% of rice of India's PDS, which is then redistributed to other net negative producer states which produce less than they consume. Distribution of food grains to poor people throughout the country is managed by state governments. As of 2011 there were 5.51 Lakh Fair Price Shops (FPS) across India. Under the PDS scheme, each family below the poverty line is eligible for 35 kg of rice or wheat every month, while a household above the poverty line is entitled to 15 kg of foodgrain on a monthly basis, redeemable with a card. However, there are concerns about the efficiency of the distribution process.

In coverage and public expenditure, it is considered to be the most important food security network. However, the food grains supplied by the ration shops are enough to meet the consumption needs of the poor. In the 1980s and 1990s, the PDS was criticised for its urban bias and its failure to serve the poorer sections of the population effectively. The Targeted PDS is expensive and until the early 2000s, there was a lot of corruption (i.e., people did not get all of what they were entitled to).

== Evolution of the PDS ==
=== 1950-1997: Gradual expansion ===
The origins of the PDS go back to the system of food rationing introduced by the British during the Second World War. It was subsequently dismantled but had to be reintroduced at the time of independence owing to severely inflationary pressures. In the initial years after independence, the system initially was largely an urban phenomenon relying largely on food imports and was used mainly as a price stabilizing tool. The setting up of the Foodgrains Prices Committee in 1964 strengthened the position of the PDS. The government committed itself to announce a minimum support price (MSP) to promote agriculture and the stocks procured were to be used towards meeting the needs of the PDS. If procurement fell short, the government was to resort to imports and other measures such as monopoly procurement, and levy on farmers. In the subsequent decades, the coverage and reach of the PDS expanded considerably on the back of various state-led schemes and the increased need for foodgrains to implement various regional and poverty programmes. The total number of ration shops increased from around 50,000 in 1960 to around 3,50,000 by 1990-91 and the quantity of foodgrains distributed increased from about 5 million tonnes in 1960–61 to about 16 million tonnes in 1990–91. In June 1992, the 'revamped' PDS scheme was launched with the aim of covering 1750 blocks in hilly, remote, and inaccessible areas with the per kg. issue price to states set to 50 paise below the central issue price. By this time, the urban bias that was a characteristic of the PDS in the early post-independence years had largely disappeared. Nonetheless, the overall coverage of PDS was quite limited and patchy till this point. As per data from the National Sample Surveys (NSS), only 27% of rural and 29% of urban households purchased grains from the PDS in 1993–94. This was despite the fact that all through this while the PDS was in principle a universal scheme such that every Indian was entitled to a ration card and purchase grains from the PDS. Some observers attributed the limited access to the steadily rising prices at which grains were sold from the PDS (i.e. the issue prices) while others blamed poor administration, corruption, and lack of political will. There was evidence of corruption from the PDS as well as lack of progressiveness of benefits. This led to some calls for replacing the PDS with direct income transfers. Further, in the wake of the structural adjustment policies that came with the 1991 economic reforms, 'targeting' (i.e. restricting welfare benefits only to the poor) gained prominence as a way of enhancing coverage among the poor while reducing fiscal expenditures.

=== 1997-2013: Targeted PDS ===
In 1997, the PDS was officially converted from a universal to a targeted scheme. Households were to be divided into two categories – below poverty line (BPL) and above poverty line (APL). BPL households were entitled to 10 kg per month, later revised to 35 kg, at 50% of the central government's procurement cost. Till 2000–01, APL households were entitled to purchase 15 kg of grains at 75% of the procurement cost, after which they had to pay the full economic cost. In 2000, the Antyodaya (AAY) category was added which covered 1 crore (later 2 crore) 'poorest of the poor' households that were entitled to 25 kg (later 35 kg) of grains per month from the PDS irrespective of family size at Rs. 3/kg for rice and Rs. 2/kg for wheat. The targeted approach to the PDS brought with it two implementational challenges: (i) estimating the number of poor to be covered by the BPL category and (ii) identifying the poor in accordance with the coverage targets determined. It was decided that the coverage of BPL households would be based on the state-wise poverty head count ratios estimated from the 1993-94 NSS consumption expenditure survey. This made the highly contentious 'poverty line' extremely salient in welfare policy. In order to identify eligible households, the government initially used results of a survey conducted in 1992–03 to identify beneficiaries of the Integrated Rural Development Programme (IRDP). Subsequently, the government conducted a BPL Census in 2002 which scored households on 13 different parameters covering assets, occupation, land ownership etc. and identified BPL households as those falling below a certain cut-off.

==== Issues with targeting ====
While the shift from universal to targeted PDS was meant to enhance coverage among the poor and reduce corruption, a large body of work found that it effectively did the opposite. In 2004–05, in total only 34% of households possessed a BPL or AAY card with nearly half of households in the poorest 20% of the consumption distribution excluded. On the other hand, among the richest 40% of households, roughly 20%-25% possessed a ration card. A majority of the scheduled caste (SC), scheduled tribe (ST), and other backward class (OBC) households were excluded from the PDS. In total, only 34% of households had a BPL or AAY card. The message from these numbers was clear - the targeting process based on poverty lines and the BPL census led to severe exclusion and inclusion errors. This message was further strengthened by numerous state-specific studies. In most states, the shift to the targeted PDS resulted in decline in per-capita PDS purchases between 1999-2000 and 2004–05. The states worst affected by the reform were Kerala and Tamil Nadu which historically had high PDS coverage and purchases prior to 1997–98. While the issue was partly related to poor design and implementation of the 2002 BPL Census, the very idea of defining the coverage base of PDS based on poverty lines continued to be fraught with various unresolved conceptual issues.

==== Large-scale leakages ====
Along with a decline in coverage, the switch to a targeted PDS brought with it large-scale leakages. At the All-India level, the share of total allocated grains not reaching households increased from 24% in 1999–2000 to 39% in 2001–02 to 54% in 2004–05. The All-India figures mask considerable state-wide heterogeneity, with very low levels of leakages in states like Andhra Pradesh, Kerala and Tamil Nadu and very high leakages in states like Bihar, Jharkhand, Punjab, Rajasthan. This was likely due to a number of factors including lower overall coverage of the PDS, reduced consumer base of fair price shops, low levels of utilization and a shift in the PDS away from the places that it worked well. Two important dimensions of the leakage issue are worth noting.

First, leakages were considerably higher for rice than wheat. Estimated leakages for rice were lower than for wheat in almost all states and per-capita wheat purchases remained low and leakages high during this period.

Second, leakages from the APL allocation were more than twice as high than the leakages from the BPL allocation, possibly since the APL allocations fluctuated arbitrarily and hence APL households often did not know what they were entitled to. Indeed, there is some evidence to suggest that the APL quota of states was an important predictor of the overall level of leakages.

==== Steady revival ====
From 2004-05 onwards, the PDS displayed a steady revival on various dimensions. Between 2004-05 and 2011–12, the share of rural households with a BPL or AAY ration card increased from 30% to 44%, coverage significantly improved among SC, ST, OBC households and many households in the poorest three consumption deciles moved from APL to BPL entitlements. The share of households actually purchasing grains from the PDS also increased significantly from 25% in 2004–05 to 50% in 2011–12. Further, PDS accounted for nearly 46% of total household rice purchases. This improvement in PDS utilization was matched by a reduction in leakages between 2004–05 and 2011–12. At the All-India level, between 2004–05 and 2011–12, leakages fell from 54% to 42% based on NSS estimates and from 49% to 32% based on the India Human Development Survey (IHDS). While this improvement was modest, it showed that improvements in PDS functioning was certainly possible. The erstwhile poorly performing states of Bihar, Chhattisgarh, and Odisha saw significant improvements and states like Andhra Pradesh, Himachal Pradesh, and Tamil Nadu, where the PDS was already performing well, consolidated their positions further.

These improvements were largely the outcome of various bold initiatives by many state governments. Tamil Nadu and Himachal Pradesh moved towards universalization of their PDS, Chhattisgarh did away with private PDS dealers and implemented a stronger monitoring system, and various other states supplemented the central subsidy to reduce issue prices and/or expand coverage. Starting 2009–10, Kerala decided to automatically include all SC, ST and fisherperson households as well as destitute persons; subsequently in 2010–11, all agricultural labourer households and traditional industrial worker households were automatically eligible for subsidized grains irrespective of APL/BPL status. Another likely factor contributing to the PDS revival was the significant rise in global food prices around this time which led to a rise in domestic food prices. This led to increase in the value of PDS subsidy for households which evidence suggests led to increases in PDS purchases in most states.

=== 2013-current: National Food Security Act ===
In 2013, the Indian parliament passed the National Food Security Act (NFSA) which brought major reforms to the national food security policy and the PDS. This included converting PDS from a welfare scheme to a legal entitlement, restructuring the process of procurement and distribution, expanded coverage of the PDS, reduction of issue price, shift from household to per-capita entitlements and discarding the APL-BPL method of targeting households. The All-India coverage of the PDS was set to 67% of the population, with 75% coverage in rural areas and 50% in urban areas with poorer states getting higher coverage than poorer states (see table below). In several cases, however, states felt the coverage was too low. The price at which rice, wheat and millets were sold from the PDS were almost halved and fixed at Rs. 3, Rs. 2, and Rs. 1 per kg. respectively. While the NFSA did not universalize the PDS and continued with a targeted approach, it did discarded the APL-BPL method of targeting and left the selection of eligible households on state governments. Households were now to be divided into Priority households (PHH) and Antyodaya (AAY) only with the APL category disbanded. Entitlements of 5 kg per person per month were set for PHH households and 35 kg per household irrespective of family size for AAY households. Various states relied on simple inclusion-exclusion criteria to identify eligible households, often using the Socio-Economic Caste Census (SECC) or other recent data they had.

== Current status ==
=== Implementation of NFSA ===
While the NFSA came into effect in September 2013, its roll-out at the state-level happened with a significant lag as state governments struggled to prepare new beneficiary lists, computerize their ration cards, and stream-line various other processes of distribution. The delay in the release of the SECC also contributed to this delay. The earliest states to implement the NFSA were Delhi, Haryana, Himachal Pradesh, Punjab and Rajasthan between September and December 2013, while Kerala and Tamil Nadu did so only in November 2016 owing to centre-state negotiations over coverage.

The suppression of the 2017-18 NSS consumption expenditure survey round by the central government and the absence of any other reliable nationally representative consumption survey with relevant questions on the PDS has meant that a comprehensive evaluation of the PDS post-NFSA has not yet been possible. Nonetheless, evidence from numerous small-scale surveys points to increase in coverage, decline in exclusion errors, reduction in leakages, and improved transportation of grains. A six-state survey covering 3,800 households across Bihar, Chhattisgarh, Jharkhand, Madhya Pradesh, Odisha, West Bengal found that the PDS was "near universal" in rural areas of these states, inclusion and exclusion errors were down, and majority of households in Madhya Pradesh, Odisha and West Bengal received their full entitlements from PDS. Even in Jharkhand, one of the states with poorest performing PDS in the early 2000s with leakages as high as 85%, multiple surveys point to clean-up of beneficiary lists, significant reduction in leakages, enhanced coverage, and significant overall improvement in the performance of the PDS post implementation of the NFSA. By 2017, leakages were down to about 15% in aggregate and about 7%-10% conditional on purchasing from the PDS.

=== Latest coverage estimates ===
The table below presents the state-wise population coverage mandated by the NFSA, population coverage in 2020 (latest available year) by NFSA ration cards (PHH + AAY) and state schemes. The NFSA mandated a population coverage of 67% at the All-India level. The central government used the 2011 population census figures to arrive at state-wise coverage targets and allocations. However, by 2020, the NFSA covered only 59% of the projected population, resulting in an under-coverage of over 100 million people. This under-coverage is mainly because the central government froze the coverage targets based on the now-outdated 2011 census and has not updated them ever since despite sustained population growth in the last decade or so. This remains an important unresolved issue to date. In addition to the 59% population covered under the NFSA, another 11% were covered under state schemes, majority of whom (7 percentage points) receive NFSA equivalent entitlements or more. These come from states that run an "expanded PDS", increasing coverage and/or reducing issue prices beyond NFSA mandates - this includes southern states (Andhra, Tamil Nadu, Telangana) as well as poorer states like Chhattisgarh, Odisha and West Bengal. Including the population covered under state schemes, 950 million persons were covered by the PDS, with 899 million having NFSA equivalent entitlements or more. Besides enhanced coverage, some states also reduced the issue prices at their own costs. In Tamil Nadu, rice is distributed free of cost to all entitled cardholders and Chhattisgarh, Jharkhand, and Odisha provide rice at a lower price than the central government's issue price.

States	Population coverage mandated by NFSA (%)	Estimated population share (%) in 2020 in possession of a:	
States	Population coverage mandated by NFSA (%)	NFSA (PHH/AAY) ration card	State scheme ration card
All-India	67	59	11
Andaman & Nicobar Islands	17	15	77
Andhra Pradesh	54	50	28
Arunachal Pradesh	63	55	6
Assam	81	70	0
Bihar	84	70	0
Chandigarh	47	25	0
Chhattisgarh	79	67	20
Dadra & Nagar Haveli	69	52	0
Delhi	43	39	0
Goa	36	35	51
Gujarat	63	49	0
Haryana	50	42	0
Himachal Pradesh	54	38	61
Jammu & Kashmir	59	52	33
Jharkhand	80	68	0
Karnataka	66	64	11
Kerala	46	44	56
Lakshadweep	34	32	0
Madhya Pradesh	75	64	0
Maharashtra	62	56	3
Manipur	88	81	–
Meghalaya	72	62	–
Mizoram	65	57	–
Nagaland	75	58	–
Odisha	78	72	2
Puducherry	51	48	–
Punjab	51	45	0
Rajasthan	65	62	0
Sikkim	67	55	18
Tamil Nadu	51	47	38
Telangana	54	49	23
Tripura	68	62	32
Uttar Pradesh	76	63	0
Uttarakhand	61	56	42
West Bengal	66	61	33

Notes: " - " implies no public information available. State cards includes those with NFSA equivalent entitlements or more & those with lesser entitlements as against NFSA.

=== Pradhan Mantri Garib Kalyan Anna Yojana (PMGKAY) ===
In light of the COVID-19 crisis, as part of its relief package, in March 2020 the government announced an additional 5 kg rice or wheat per person and 1 kg pulses per family free of cost for all NFSA cardholders, over and above the usual NFSA entitlements.

== Center state responsibilities ==
Under the NFSA, the central government is responsible for financing the subsidy necessary for meeting the state-wise NFSA coverage targets. The central and state governments share the responsibility of regulating the PDS. While the central government is responsible for procurement, storage, transportation, and bulk allocation of food grains, state governments hold the responsibility for distributing the same to the consumers through the established network of fair price shops (FPSs). State governments are also responsible for operational responsibilities of the NFSA including identification of eligible families in compliance with NFSA coverage targets, issue of ration cards, and monitoring of the distribution system.

In addition, as mentioned above, some states run an 'expanded' PDS by increasing coverage beyond NFSA mandates and/or reducing the price at grains and/or providing additional food commodities like pulses and edible oil. Indeed, besides 10 major states (and excluding north-eastern states), all other states run an expanded PDS of some form. Of these, most notably Andhra Pradesh, Chhattisgarh, Kerala, Maharashtra, Odisha, Tamil Nadu and West Bengal have expanded coverage and provide NFSA equivalent entitlements or more to these added beneficiaries (the rest have expanded coverage but provide lesser entitlements against NFSA). Among these, Chhattisgarh, Maharashtra, Odisha and West Bengal finance their expanded PDS entirely out of state funds while the others receive some financial assistance from the central government in the form of 'tide-over' grains.

== Evidence on effectiveness of PDS ==
=== Poverty reduction ===
One way to think of the PDS is to think of it as an income transfer programme, with the value of the transfer being equal to the difference between open-market price and PDS price of foodgrains multiplied by the quantity of foodgrains received. Let $P_{OM}$ denote the open-market price of grains, $P_{PDS}$ the PDS price of grains, and $Q_{PDS}$ the total quantity purchased from the PDS. The value of the PDS transfer is given by $(P_{OM} - P_{PDS}) * Q_{PDS}$. Based on this framework, the PDS seems to have had an important effect on poverty-reduction. For instance, in 2009–10, the poverty gap ratio would have been 18%-22% higher in the absence of the PDS, with even larger gains to the tune of 40%-80% in states like Tamil Nadu and Chhattisgarh that had a well-functioning PDS. If the imputed value of mid-day meals were also taken into account, the effect of PDS on poverty reduction was even stronger. These large national-level effects were seen despite the fact that the PDS still performed rather poorly in some states at this time.

=== Nutritional outcomes ===
Some of the earlier studies which analyzed the PDS during the 1990s and early 2000s found no effect of the PDS on nutritional outcomes. In contrast, recent studies, focussing on the PDS in the more recent period, do find some positive effects. Studying the expansion of the PDS in Chhattisgarh, one study found that households increased consumption of protein and other nutrients relative to households in bordering districts of neighbouring states. Another study found moderate increases in households nutrient intake and diet quality resulting from the universalization of the PDS in the 8 districts in the Kalahandi-Bolangir-Koraput (KBK) region in Odisha. At the All-India level, one study finds that increases in the value of PDS transfers resulting from random price shocks at the district-level leads to significant increase in caloric intake of not just cereals (distributed via the PDS) but also other food groups not catered to via the PDS as well. This suggests possible 'crowd-in' effects of the PDS on nutrition. So far, only one study analyzes the effect of the roll-out of NFSA on nutritional outcomes - it finds that increase in PDS subsidy increases dietary diversity and caloric intake and also find evidence for crowd-in of non-staple food groups. Additionally, it finds that increase in PDS transfers led to higher wages and significant reduction of child stunting.

== PDS vs. cash transfers ==
An issue that has often dominated debates surrounding the PDS is the issue of whether the PDS, which involves distribution of in-kind food grains, is an efficient method welfare delivery. At least since the 1990s, there have been repeated calls to replace the PDS with a cash transfer. These were at least partly motivated by the high-levels of leakages observed from the PDS.

The calls for a switch from in-kind PDS to cash transfers are based on the following key arguments (among others). First, as opposed to the current PDS system which involves running the extensive procurement, storage, and distribution system, cash transfers are viewed as a more efficient way of transferring a given value of transfer with lower transaction costs. The reduced middle-men in the process make cash transfers seem less prone to corruption. Second, cash transfers render greater choice to the beneficiaries by allowing them to choose whether they want to spend the extra income on food or some other commodity. Third, the reliance of the PDS on public procurement of grains necessitates government involvement in the agricultural markets which is frowned upon by many.

Despite these potential benefits, others have opposed the move to a cash transfer in lieu of the PDS on various grounds. Most importantly, it is unclear if the banking sector, especially in rural areas, is ready to seamlessly replace the PDS. In the union territories of Puducherry, Chandigarh, Dadra and Nagar Haveli, the government replaced PDS with cash transfers in September 2015. A full year into the programme, roughly 20% of beneficiaries did not receive their benefits and for a majority of beneficiaries the costs (in terms of time and money) involved in going to the bank and accessing cash was higher that accessing PDS grains. Similarly, in 2018 the government piloted the 'DBT for Rations' (DBT = Direct Benefit Transfer) scheme in Nagri block of Jharkhand. A study of the pilot found that on an average, households only received two of the four instalments due to them since the start of pilot. Further, on an average, households said that the whole process of withdrawing money and purchasing their monthly entitlement of grains took 12 hours on an average. These results were qualitatively confirmed by another study of the pilot. The public opposition to this reform was so strong that the government was forced to roll it back shortly after. The experience of these pilot experiments suggest that there could be high transition costs associated with switching from a well-established PDS to a system of cash transfers. Further, evidence from cash transfers in NREGA suggest that, even with well established systems in place, the time and costs involved in accessing cash transfers can be very high in rural areas.

Using a novel dataset collected from over 1200 households across nine states in 2011, one study reports that on aggregate about two-thirds of beneficiaries preferred the PDS over cash transfers. Further, the proportion preferring the PDS was higher in states where the PDS worked well (measured in-terms of leakages). A major explanation that households gave was that they felt more food secure with PDS grains as opposed to cash transfers. This is borne out by other by another study - using data from successive rounds of NSS consumption surveys, the authors argue that in-kind transfers via the PDS maybe superior to cash transfers by shielding households against price shocks and inflation and thereby weakening the relationship between prices and caloric intake. Another factor for preferring PDS over cash was the poor development of rural markets – for an average rural household, the nearest PDS outlet was located about 1 to 2 km closer than the closest grain market. Moreover, as of 2011, there were about half a million PDS shops covering about 75% villages, compared to only 8% of villages with a bank branch and 25% of villages with a post-office.

== Aadhaar-based biometric authentication ==
Starting around 2015–16, Aadhaar-based biometric authentication (ABBA) was made mandatory for accessing PDS rations in various states, ostensibly with the aim of reducing leakages and corruption in the PDS. This means that in order to collect their monthly grain entitlements, ration card holders must now present their fingerprints to authenticate their identity. The claim was that integrating Aadhaar would help in identifying ghosts, fakes, and duplicate beneficiaries in the PDS lists, enforce stricter identity verification, improve supply-chain management and reduce corruption in the system. These claims have been questioned and observed have argued that they over-sell the potential benefits of Aadhaar in PDS. Even in-principle, Aadhaar can only help with certain types of leakages and not others - it can help with identifying fakes and ghosts (identity fraud) but is of no help is stopping leakages that come from PDS dealers giving beneficiaries less than their entitlements (quantity fraud). Moreover, there are no reliable estimates of the size of identity and quantity fraud in recent years at the All-India level.

Whatever evidence is available suggests that fake and ghost ration cards are a very small problem. A large-scale survey conducted as part of a randomized controlled trial (RCT) in Jharkhand by researchers at J-PAL found that at most 3% of total ration cards in the state were fake or ghosts. Similarly, in the state of Odisha, the role of Aadhaar in identifying ghosts and fakes was found to very small - only 4% of ration cards deleted were on account of Aadhaar. Another 6-state survey conducted in 2016 reports few fakes or ghosts in the PDS lists of the surveyed states. This stands in contrast to the governments claim in September 2016 that it had deleted 2.33 crore ration cards thanks to Aadhaar. This widely circulated figure was subsequently shown to be misleading since most of these deletions had happened before Aadhaar was even introduced for various reasons like death, migration, ineligibility, and marriage in which Aadhaar had no role to play.

On the issue of quantity fraud (dealers taking cuts from households), two independent studies from the state of Jharkhand, including a RCT, found that per-se mandating ABBA in the PDS led to no effect on corruption. It is possible that the detailed transaction records that ABBA generates could help plug some leakages by improving verification of past records and supply chain management. One of these studies argues that a subsequent 'reconciliation' reform (after ABBA was enforced for some months) in Jharkhand where the government tracked the quantities of grains sold in previous months before making new disbursements led to reduction in leakages from the government's point of view. However, this interpretation has been questioned since the reduced leakages were short-lived, came at the cost of large-scale exclusion and a severe reduction in the quantity of grains disbursed to beneficiaries, and the reform had to be called-off within 3 months due to large-scale opposition.

While the evidence of Aadhaar helping with corruption is limited, there is credible evidence that enforcing ABBA in the PDS led to exclusion of genuine beneficiaries and increased transaction costs involved in accessing PDS grains. This was reported by both the studies from Jharkhand mentioned above. Another study found that about 2.5 million beneficiaries in Rajasthan and Andhra Pradesh were denied their food rations due to ABBA. The reason for these exclusions is because ABBA rests on a fragile technological infrastructure that needs to work simultaneously in order to for authentication to work: Aadhaar 'seeding' (i.e. linking Aadhaar number with PDS ration card), point of sale (Pos) machine, internet connectivity, remote Aadhaar servers, and biometric authentication. Failure at any of these steps, for technical reasons or otherwise, leads to unsuccessful authentication. In fact, official data from the Unique Identification Authority of India (UIDAI) itself suggested that in early 2018 about 12% of authentication requests for government services failed.

== Food surplus states ==
Food surplus states are the provider of India's food security. Most states in India do not produce the surplus food and they are the net consumer of the food. There is a very small number of states that produce the surplus food which provides the food security to all of India. Jat-farmers dominated Haryana and Punjab are the biggest provider of food security to India. Haryana and Punjab are the net surplus producer of the food, while most of the states in India are net consumer of the food.

As of 2023, 70-90% of wheat & 28-44% of rice of India's total national food Public Distribution System (PDS) is provided by Haryana and Punjab, which is then redistributed to other net negative producer states which produce less than what they consume. Both small states are massive provider to the food security of India.

== Fair price shop (FPS) ==
A public distribution shop, also known as fair price shop (FPS), is a part of India's public system established by the Government of India which distributes rations at a subsidised price to the poor. Locally these are known as ration shops and public distribution shops, and chiefly sell wheat, rice and sugar at a price lower than the market price called Issue Price. Other essential commodities may also be sold. To buy items one must have a ration card. These shops are operated throughout the country by joint assistance of central and state government. The items from these shops are much cheaper but are of average quality. Ration shops are now present in most localities, villages towns and cities. India has more than 5.5 lakh (0.55 million) shops, constituting the largest distribution network in the world (According to 2011 census).

== Shortcomings ==
The public distribution system of India is not without its defects. With a coverage of around 40 million below-poverty-line families, a review discovered the following structural shortcomings and disturbances:

1. Growing instances of the consumers receiving inferior quality food grains in ration shops.
2. Rogue dealers swap good supplies received from the Food Corporation of India (FCI) with inferior stock and sell the good quality FCI stock to private shopkeepers.
3. Illicit fair price shop owners have been found to create large number of bogus cards to sell food grains in the open market.
4. Many FPS dealers resort to malpractice, illegal diversions of commodities, holding and black marketing due to the minimum salary received by them.
5. Numerous malpractices make safe and nutritious food inaccessible and un-affordable to many poor thus resulting in their food insecurity.
6. Identification of households to be denoted status and distribution to granted PDS services has been highly irregular and diverse in various states. The recent development of Aadhar UIDAI cards has taken up the challenge of solving the problem of identification and distribution of PDs services along with Direct Cash Transfers.
7. Regional allocation and coverage of FPS are unsatisfactory and the core objective of price stabilization of essential commodities has not met.
8. There is no set criteria as to which families are above or below the poverty line. This ambiguity gives massive scope for corruption and fallouts in PDS systems because some who are meant to benefit are not able to.

Several schemes have augmented the number of people aided by PDS. Poor supervision of FPS and lack of accountability meant that middlemen were able to siphon off a good proportion of the stock meant for the poor. Since the early 2000s, one state after another has been able to reform its PDS.

There used to be lack of clarity as to which families should be included in the below the poverty line list. This resulted in the genuinely poor being excluded whilst the ineligible get several cards. After the implementation of the NFSA, the situation has improved to some extent. As a result of these improvements, it is estimated that in 2009–10, the PDS reduced the poverty gap index by 18-22% at the all India level.

The stock assigned to a single family cannot be bought in installments. This used to be a barrier to the efficient functioning and overall success of PDS in India before PDS prices were reduced as a result of the implementation of the National Food Security Act, 2013.

Many poor families are not able to acquire ration cards either because they are seasonal migrant workers or because they live in unauthorized colonies. Lack of clarity in the planning and structuring of social safety and security programs in India has resulted in the creation of numerous cards for the poor. Limited information about the overall use of cards has discouraged families below the poverty line from registering for new cards and increased illegal creation of cards by such families to ensure maximum benefit for the family members.

== Suggestions ==
To improve the current system of the PDS, the following suggestions are furnished:

1. Vigilance squad should be strengthened to detect corruption, which is an added expenditure for taxpayers.
2. Personnel-in-charge of the department should be chosen locally.
3. Margin of profit should be increased for honest business, in which case the market system is more apt anyway.
4. F.C.I. and other prominent agencies should provide quality food grains for distribution, which is a tall order for an agency that has no real incentive to do so.
5. Frequent checks and raids should be conducted to eliminate bogus and duplicate cards, which is again an added expenditure and not foolproof.
6. The Civil Supplies Corporation should open more fair price shops in rural areas.
7. The fair price dealers seldom display rate chart and quantity available in the block-boards in front of the shop. This should be enforced.
8. Some social activists have suggested that pulse is an importance source of protein so besides rice / wheat pulses like arhar (toor) should also be included in PDS system

In aggregate, only about 42% of subsidised grains issued by the central pool reach the target group, according to a Planning Commission study released in March 2008.

But the United Progressive Alliance, which came to power in 2004, decided on a common minimum programme (CMP) and on the agenda was food and nutrition security. Under that the government had plans to strengthen the food security program DS.

However, finance minister Arun Jaitley in his budget speech went contrary to the idea proposed in the CMP and proposed the idea of the food stamp scheme. He has proposed to try the scheme in few districts of India to see its viability.

In a 2014 judgment, Delhi High Court has ruled that fair price shops cannot be allotted to a below poverty line card holder.

== Corruption and reforms ==
The Aaj Tak news channel on 14 October 2013 performed a sting operation on PDS named Operation Black. It showed how the distribution reaches mills instead of fair price shops.

NDTV produced a show which documented how the Government of Chhattisgarh's food department managed to fix its broken system so that the diversion of grain came down from about 50% in 2004–05 to about 10% in 2009–10.

Research on the PDS suggests (as these two programmes show) that the situation varies quite a lot across the country.

Before the enactment of the National Food Security Act, 2013, the main source of leakages from the PDS was the opaque APL

== See also ==
- Amar Dukan
- Direct Benefit Transfer
- Subsidies in India
- Malnutrition in India
- National Food Security Act, 2013
- Pradhan Mantri Garib Kalyan Anna Yojana
- Ration card (India)
