= Global Food Security Index =

The Global Food Security Index consists of a set of indices from 113 countries. It measures food security across most of the countries of the world. It was first published in 2012, and is managed and updated annually by The Economist's intelligence unit.

== Global food production ==
Food security differs around the world, with some regions being much more prone to food insecurity due to both lack of fertile land, as well as capital that could procure sufficient food through the purchasing of imports. This demand for food is steadily growing, especially in developing countries, with studies showing it is likely to grow between 70% and 100% over the four decades from 2009. Much research is underway to increase the productivity of crops, and therefore cultivate a greater volume of food. But, unless that research extends to countries characterized by poor, high-density populations, Global Food Security Index scores are likely to decrease in the coming years. Some journals, such as Science, suggest that it is imported that play the biggest role in producing these index scores, as in developing countries, a much greater percentage of the working force is dedicated to agriculture, yet they remain the countries with the lowest Global Food Security Index Scores. This is further illustrated by the fact that the United States and Singapore consistently have the two highest Global Food Security Index scores, even though the portion of their respective economies dealing with agriculture is comparatively negligible.

== Criteria ==
The following parameters are considered for ranking countries in relation to food security:

1. Nutritional standards
2. Urban absorption capacity
3. Food consumption as a share of household expenditure
4. Food loss
5. Protein quality
6. Agricultural import tariffs
7. Diet diversification
8. Agricultural infrastructure
9. Volatility of agricultural production
10. Proportion of population under the global poverty line
11. Gross domestic product per capita (US$ PPP)
12. Presence of food safety net programs
13. Access to financing for farmers
14. Public expenditure on agricultural R&D
15. Corruption
16. Political stability risk
17. Sufficiency of supply
18. Food safety

== 2022 ==
Rank	Country	Overall score	Affordability	Availability	Quality and Safety	Sustainability and Adaptation
1st	Finland	83.7	91.9	70.5	88.4	82.6
2nd	Ireland	81.7	92.6	70.5	86.1	75.1
3rd	Norway	80.5	87.2	60.4	86.8	87.4
4th	France	80.2	91.3	69.0	87.7	70.3
5th	Netherlands	80.1	92.7	70.7	84.7	69.2
6th	Japan	79.5	89.8	81.2	77.4	66.1
=7th	Sweden	79.1	91.9	68.3	85.0	68.3
=7th	Canada	79.1	88.3	75.7	89.5	60.1
9th	United Kingdom	78.8	91.5	71.6	77.6	71.1
10th	Portugal	78.7	90.0	77.0	79.8	64.5
11th	Switzerland	78.2	89.2	76.8	73.5	69.5
12th	Austria	78.1	91.3	67.1	81.2	69.7
13th	United States	78.0	87.1	65.1	88.8	69.4
=14th	Denmark	77.8	92.1	63.2	89.1	63.8
=14th	New Zealand	77.8	91.6	67.7	73.1	75.1
16th	Czech Republic	77.7	91.3	69.4	76.3	70.3
17th	Belgium	77.5	92.6	64.6	88.4	61.0
18th	Costa Rica	77.4	83.0	73.0	79.2	73.3
19th	Germany	77.0	87.9	67.0	79.9	70.8
20th	Spain	75.7	89.0	63.1	81.2	66.4
21st	Poland	75.5	87.4	63.8	81.5	66.7
22nd	Australia	75.4	93.3	61.1	84.0	58.8
23rd	United Arab Emirates	75.2	86.7	73.8	81.3	55.2
24th	Israel	74.8	88.6	67.2	87.4	52.2
=25th	Chile	74.2	82.4	68.8	77.0	66.6
=25th	China	74.2	86.4	79.2	72.0	54.5
27th	Italy	74.0	89.5	68.7	75.9	57.3
28th	Singapore	73.1	93.2	77.8	69.7	44.3
29th	Bulgaria	73.0	85.8	66.5	79.5	56.6
30th	Qatar	72.4	88.6	72.9	71.7	51.0
31st	Greece	72.2	88.5	58.3	80.8	57.3
32nd	Kazakhstan	72.1	78.0	67.2	76.3	65.4
33rd	Uruguay	71.8	80.0	65.6	73.8	65.8
34th	Hungary	71.4	86.7	63.3	74.4	57.0
35th	Oman	71.2	88.6	64.3	73.2	53.6
36th	Slovakia	71.1	89.1	55.3	77.9	57.6
37th	Peru	70.8	79.7	58.6	75.2	68.1
38th	Bahrain	70.3	91.3	60.1	76.3	47.3
39th	South Korea	70.2	76.8	71.5	71.5	58.5
40th	Panama	70.0	84.4	63.3	69.7	58.3
=41st	Saudi Arabia	69.9	83.2	67.2	71.6	53.7
=41st	Malaysia	69.9	87.0	59.5	74.7	53.7
=43rd	Russia	69.1	77.8	61.4	78.7	56.6
=43rd	Mexico	69.1	76.0	60.0	78.9	60.2
45th	Romania	68.8	85.1	60.6	77.9	47.1
46th	Vietnam	67.9	84.0	60.7	70.2	52.2
47th	Jordan	66.2	85.3	59.8	55.4	58.9
48th	Ecuador	65.6	70.8	59.3	69.4	62.0
49th	Turkey	65.3	58.4	65.3	78.5	61.2
50th	Kuwait	65.2	80.0	62.9	67.8	45.5
51st	Brazil	65.1	63.0	58.6	83.9	56.3
=52nd	Dominican Republic	65.0	73.4	65.0	65.3	53.5
=52nd	Bolivia	65.0	71.6	61.6	71.7	53.2
54th	Argentina	64.8	62.0	63.4	85.5	49.4
55th	Belarus	64.5	67.8	61.9	69.0	58.5
56th	El Salvador	64.2	72.5	71.2	71.5	38.1
57th	Morocco	63.0	74.6	42.9	73.1	60.0
58th	Guatemala	62.8	65.2	56.7	61.3	67.9
59th	South Africa	61.7	63.4	60.1	66.1	56.9
60th	Honduras	61.5	59.8	61.9	64.9	60.0
61st	Serbia	61.4	81.5	49.3	72.6	37.0
62nd	Tunisia	60.3	74.5	54.1	58.8	49.7
63rd	Indonesia	60.2	81.4	50.9	56.2	46.3
=64th	Thailand	60.1	83.7	52.9	45.3	51.6
=64th	Colombia	60.1	64.6	54.6	63.3	56.9
66th	Azerbaijan	59.8	78.1	56.2	54.5	44.6
67th	Philippines	59.3	71.5	55.2	65.3	41.8
=68th	Algeria	58.9	66.8	57.3	54.7	54.2
=68th	India	58.9	59.3	62.3	62.1	51.2
70th	Paraguay	58.6	74.3	47.0	76.3	32.8
71st	Ukraine	57.9	66.6	48.1	71.3	43.5
72nd	Myanmar	57.6	62.1	53.5	64.4	49.0
73rd	Uzbekistan	57.5	52.7	56.4	64.6	57.9
74th	Nepal	56.9	52.7	70.9	57.8	46.2
75th	Tajikistan	56.7	59.8	56.3	56.5	53.1
76th	Nicaragua	56.6	64.4	50.2	57.5	52.7
77th	Egypt	56.0	65.2	54.2	45.9	55.8
78th	Cambodia	55.7	74.3	54.5	54.0	33.9
79th	Sri Lanka	55.2	61.0	57.2	55.0	45.3
80th	Bangladesh	54.0	52.1	61.5	58.4	43.9
81st	Laos	53.1	59.7	51.8	51.7	47.0
82nd	Kenya	53.0	41.7	52.5	68.8	52.6
83rd	Ghana	52.6	59.9	52.4	50.5	45.1
84th	Pakistan	52.2	59.9	58.3	49.4	37.7
85th	Mali	51.9	53.4	48.7	56.8	48.8
86th	Senegal	51.2	57.9	47.8	53.9	43.5
87th	Botswana	51.1	69.0	40.5	57.3	32.9
88th	Rwanda	50.6	48.4	51.8	50.3	52.7
89th	Burkina Faso	49.6	49.5	49.8	52.8	46.4
90th	Tanzania	49.1	45.8	58.7	50.2	41.7
=91st	Benin	48.1	50.5	53.6	48.1	38.9
=91st	Malawi	48.1	33.6	52.9	52.0	58.2
93rd	Uganda	47.7	48.3	41.0	45.1	57.0
94th	Mozambique	47.3	42.6	49.4	41.8	56.5
95th	Côte d'Ivoire	46.5	54.2	42.1	44.1	43.2
96th	Cameroon	46.4	50.4	31.9	56.5	47.0
97th	Niger	46.3	42.8	41.7	47.0	55.5
98th	Togo	46.2	45.7	51.0	42.3	45.4
99th	Guinea	45.1	37.0	49.0	39.8	56.9
100th	Ethiopia	44.5	32.9	44.7	59.3	44.9
101st	Angola	43.7	35.5	43.5	43.9	54.6
102nd	Zambia	43.5	26.8	46.7	54.2	51.6
103rd	Chad	43.2	50.1	40.0	44.7	35.9
104th	Democratic Republic of Congo	43.0	46.9	40.6	43.5	40.1
105th	Sudan	42.8	35.2	48.2	53.9	35.7
106th	Venezuela	42.6	41.8	36.7	51.5	41.4
107th	Nigeria	42.0	25.0	39.5	55.6	53.7
=108th	Burundi	40.6	32.5	41.4	52.4	38.6
=108th	Madagascar	40.6	39.5	43.0	34.9	44.9
110th	Sierra Leone	40.5	36.6	35.5	41.8	49.8
111th	Yemen	40.1	46.4	26.9	48.7	37.8
112th	Haiti	38.5	32.8	49.6	37.9	34.2
113th	Syria	36.3	32.0	26.6	50.8	38.4

== 2019 ==
No	Country	Overall Score	Affordability	Availability	Quality & Safety
1st	Singapore	87.4	95.4	83.0	79.4
2nd	Ireland	84.0	90.5	76.8	87.7
3rd	United States	83.7	87.4	78.3	89.1
4th	Switzerland	83.1	83.8	84.3	78.2
=5th	Finland	82.9	84.1	78.6	91.8
=5th	Norway	82.9	81.9	81.0	90.5
7th	Sweden	82.7	85.0	78.1	89.4
8th	Canada	82.4	83.3	80.0	86.7
9th	Australia	82.0	85.6	76.2	88.9
10th	Austria	81.7	85.4	78.6	81.1
11th	Germany	81.5	84.9	79.1	79.8
12th	Netherlands	81.4	86.6	77.1	79.9
13th	Qatar	81.2	98.9	64.0	84.1
14th	Denmark	81.0	85.4	74.8	87.2
15th	Belgium	80.7	84.4	76.2	83.9
16th	France	80.4	83.8	74.8	87.1
17th	United Kingdom	79.1	83.6	74.4	80.9
18th	Israel	79.0	83.0	73.6	83.8
19th	New Zealand	78.8	84.6	75.5	73.5
20th	Portugal	77.8	81.3	70.9	88.0
=21st	Japan	76.5	82.4	71.0	76.7
=21st	United Arab Emirates	76.5	89.8	63.7	78.5
23rd	Italy	75.8	82.5	68.3	79.7
24th	Poland	75.6	81.1	69.3	79.5
=25th	Chile	75.5	80.5	71.3	74.7
=25th	Spain	75.5	82.3	65.9	84.7
27th	Kuwait	74.8	88.1	62.3	75.9
28th	Malaysia	73.8	81.7	67.7	70.6
29th	South Korea	73.6	75.8	71.2	74.9
30th	Saudi Arabia	73.5	86.3	61.8	73.5
31st	Greece	73.4	77.8	64.9	86.0
32nd	Czech Republic	73.1	82.6	66.3	68.1
33rd	Uruguay	72.8	79.3	66.7	73.3
34th	Hungary	72.7	80.8	66.1	70.5
35th	China	71.0	74.8	66.9	72.6
36th	Belarus	70.9	76.0	62.9	80.2
37th	Argentina	70.8	78.9	60.2	79.5
38th	Romania	70.2	79.3	64.3	64.1
=39th	Brazil	70.1	77.0	58.8	84.0
=39th	Costa Rica	70.1	75.6	63.1	75.6
41st	Turkey	69.8	74.7	64.8	71.1
42nd	Russia	69.7	79.8	60.1	70.9
=43rd	Colombia	69.4	73.7	65.6	69.3
=43rd	Mexico	69.4	74.9	62.3	75.2
45th	Panama	68.8	73.8	63.1	71.8
46th	Oman	68.4	77.8	57.6	74.4
47th	Slovakia	68.3	78.6	62.1	59.4
=48th	Kazakhstan	67.3	77.5	57.7	68.3
=48th	South Africa	67.3	70.8	64.5	66.2
50th	Bahrain	66.6	81.9	56.3	56.9
51st	Bulgaria	66.2	79.0	54.2	66.8
52nd	Thailand	65.1	77.1	58.7	52.6
53rd	Azerbaijan	64.8	75.3	59.2	54.0
54th	Vietnam	64.6	75.1	59.7	51.7
55th	Egypt	64.5	57.6	70.2	65.9
56th	Dominican Republic	64.2	68.4	61.0	62.3
57th	Botswana	63.8	69.5	61.3	56.6
58th	Peru	63.3	69.1	59.0	60.4
=59th	Ghana	62.8	66.3	61.7	57.1
=59th	Morocco	62.8	61.5	64.2	61.9
=59th	Serbia	62.8	73.9	53.0	61.8
62nd	Indonesia	62.6	70.4	61.3	47.1
63rd	Ecuador	61.8	69.4	56.1	58.4
=64th	Jordan	61.0	70.5	54.8	54.2
=64th	Philippines	61.0	68.9	57.7	50.3
66th	Sri Lanka	60.8	65.0	60.0	52.4
67th	El Salvador	60.7	63.8	58.6	58.9
68th	Guatemala	60.6	65.3	57.6	57.5
69th	Tunisia	60.1	61.5	58.0	62.2
70th	Algeria	59.8	66.9	55.8	53.0
71st	Uzbekistan	59.0	65.6	55.1	53.4
72nd	India	58.9	64.2	58.4	47.0
73rd	Honduras	58.0	57.2	57.8	60.6
74th	Paraguay	57.9	72.0	42.4	65.4
75th	Bolivia	57.7	65.8	50.0	58.3
76th	Ukraine	57.1	63.9	50.0	59.6
77th	Myanmar	57.0	59.1	57.2	51.3
78th	Pakistan	56.8	63.2	55.7	43.6
79th	Nepal	56.4	58.5	55.4	53.7
80th	Mali	54.4	45.9	60.1	59.9
81st	Senegal	54.3	51.6	56.1	56.1
82nd	Nicaragua	54.2	63.5	47.9	48.2
83rd	Bangladesh	53.2	60.4	54.8	30.6
84th	Côte d'Ivoire	52.3	53.5	58.1	33.1
85th	Benin	51.0	48.6	54.9	46.4
86th	Kenya	50.7	56.7	48.0	43.2
87th	Burkina Faso	50.1	47.0	55.9	41.6
88th	Cameroon	49.9	53.7	47.6	47.0
89th	Niger	49.6	50.2	53.6	37.4
90th	Cambodia	49.4	56.7	48.1	34.6
91st	Ethiopia	49.2	49.7	52.6	39.0
92nd	Laos	49.1	55.5	47.6	37.4
93rd	Tajikistan	49.0	58.8	41.1	46.6
94th	Nigeria	48.4	50.4	45.8	50.7
95th	Rwanda	48.2	43.8	52.0	48.5
96th	Tanzania	47.6	45.1	50.4	45.9
97th	Guinea	46.7	47.4	52.4	29.0
98th	Uganda	46.2	45.8	45.5	49.1
99th	Sudan	45.7	47.1	44.4	46.0
100th	Angola	45.5	51.3	40.5	44.9
101st	Zambia	44.4	41.8	50.7	33.6
102nd	Togo	44.0	45.6	47.2	31.0
103rd	Haiti	43.3	50.3	39.6	35.9
104th	Malawi	42.5	39.4	48.6	33.1
105th	Mozambique	41.4	42.5	47.9	20.6
106th	Sierra Leone	39.0	40.8	40.3	30.6
107th	Syria	38.4	34.6	38.9	46.4
108th	Madagascar	37.9	35.7	45.7	22.1
109th	Chad	36.9	40.3	34.9	33.5
110th	Congo (Dem. Rep.)	35.7	37.3	40.0	19.8
111th	Yemen	35.6	45.5	28.6	30.2
112th	Burundi	34.3	36.6	32.2	34.5
113th	Venezuela	31.2	15.8	32.2	66.9
