= Antyodaya Anna Yojana =

Indian food subsidising program

- Country: India
- Prime Minister(s): Atal Bihari Vajpayee
- Launched: 25 December 2000; 25 years ago

Antyodaya Anna Yojana is the sponsored scheme of Government of India to provide highly subsidised food to millions of the poorest families. This scheme was developed by the then Union Food and Civil Supplies Minister, N Sri Vishnu. It was launched by the NDA government on 25 December 2000 and first implemented in the Indian state of Rajasthan.

After identifying the "poorest of the poor" (the 10,000,000 poorest families in the Below Poverty Line category) through surveying, the government began providing them an opportunity to purchase up to 35 kilograms of rice and wheat at a highly subsidised cost of ₹ 3 per kilogram of rice and ₹ 2 per kilogram of wheat. It was expanded twice by an additional 5 million BPL families in June 2003 and August 2004.

Poor families were identified by their respective state rural development facilities through the use of surveys. The scheme has been expanded twice, once in June 2003 and then in August 2004, adding an additional 5,000,000 BPL families each time and bringing the total number of families covered up to 20,000,000. after this additional 50 lakh families were added in 2013. Antyodaya Anna Yojana (AAY) is a government-sponsored program in India that aims to provide food at highly subsidized rates to millions of the poorest families in the country. It was launched on 25 December 2000, by the NDA government and was first implemented in the state of Rajasthan. The primary objective of AAY is to ensure food security for the poorest of the poor in India. The scheme provides 35 kg of food grains per month to each identified family at highly subsidized rates. The food grains include rice, wheat, and coarse grains. The AAY scheme is implemented under the Targeted Public Distribution System (TPDS). The TPDS is a system of distributing subsidized food grains to the poor through a network of fair price shops. The AAY scheme is an important component of the TPDS, as it ensures that the poorest of the poor have access to food grains at affordable prices. The AAY scheme has been successful in achieving its objectives. It has helped to reduce hunger and malnutrition among the poorest families in India. The scheme has also helped to improve the food security of the country as a whole.

== Ration cards ==
Once a family has been recognized as eligible, they are given a unique "Antyodaya Ration Card". This card, also called the PDS(public distribution card) yellow card, acts as a form of identification, proving that the bearer is authorized to receive the level of rations the card describes. The colour of the card is yellow.

== Scam ==
Numerous scam and fraud cases related to the Antyodaya Ration Card scheme have been reported across India, primarily involving the creation of fake cards, the inclusion of ineligible individuals (including the wealthy and government employees), and the manipulation of food grain distribution by officials.

== See also ==
- Deen Dayal Upadhyay Antodaya Yojana
