= Pradhan Mantri Gramin Awas Yojana =

Indian social welfare programme

Pradhan Mantri Awaas Yojna- Gramin (PMAY-G)
- Motto: Housing for All by 2028
- Country: India
- Prime Minister(s): Narendra Modi
- Ministry: Ministry of Rural Development (MoRD)
- Launched: 1 April 2016; 10 years ago 1 April 2016
- Status: Active
- Website: pmayg.nic.in//

Pradhan Mantri Gramin Aawas Yojana (lit. 'Prime Minister's Rural Housing Scheme') is a social welfare programme under the Ministry of Rural Development, Government of India, to provide housing for the rural poor in India. A similar scheme for urban poor was launched in 2015 as Housing for All by 2022. The scheme was officially launched by Prime Minister Narendra Modi on 20 November 2016 from Agra.

Indira Awas Yojana was launched in 1985 by Rajiv Gandhi, the Prime Minister of India, as one of the major flagship programs of the Ministry of Rural Development to construct houses for the Below Poverty Line population in the villages.

== Overview ==
Under the PMGAY scheme, financial assistance worth ₹120,000 (US$1,200) in plain areas and ₹130,000 (US$1,300) in difficult areas (high land area) is provided for construction of houses. These houses are equipped with facilities such as toilet, LPG connection, electricity connection, and drinking water [convergence with other schemes e.g. Swachh Bharat Abhiyan toilets, Ujjwala Yojana LPG gas connection, Saubhagya Yojana electricity connection, etc.]. The houses are allotted in the name of the woman or jointly between husband and wife. The construction of the houses is the sole responsibility of the beneficiary and engagement of contractors is strictly prohibited but in cases where beneficiary is physically disabled then it is the responsibility of block level officer to provide full assistance in construction of house under PMAY gramin. Sanitary latrine and smokeless Chullah are required to be constructed along with each IAY house for which additional financial assistance is provided from "Total Sanitation Campaign" and "Rajiv Gandhi Grameen Vidyutikaran Yojana" (which was subsumed by Deen Dayal Upadhaya Gram Jyoti Yojana) respectively. This scheme, operating since 1985, provides subsidies and cash-assistance to people in villages to construct their houses themselves.

=== History ===
Started in 1985 as part of the Rural Landless Employment Guarantee Programme (RLEGP), Indira Awas Yojana (IAY) was subsumed in Jawahar Rozgar Yojana (JRY) in 1989 and has been operating as an independent scheme since 1 January 1996. In 1993-94 this scheme was extended to Non SC/ST categories also. From 1995 to 1996 the scheme has been further extended to widows or next-of-kin of defense personnel killed in action, ex-servicemen and retired members of the paramilitary forces who wish to live in rural areas as long as they meet basic eligibility criteria.

Given that India has been historically a populous and poor country, the need of proper housing for the refugees and villagers has been a focus of Government's welfare schemes since the time of India's independence. As a result, various welfare schemes like House Sites cum Construction Assistance Scheme have been ongoing since the 1950s. However, it was only in the 1983 that a focused fund for creation of housing for scheduled castes (SCs), scheduled tribes (STs) and freed bonded labour was set up under Rural Landless Employment Guarantee Programme (RLEGP). This gave birth to IAY in the fiscal year 1985–86.

"Indira Awas Yojana" (IAY) was launched by Rajiv Gandhi, the then Prime Minister of India in 1985 and was renamed as "Pradhan Mantri Gramin Awas Yojana" (PMGAY) in 2015.

== Purpose ==
The broad purpose of the scheme is to provide financial assistance to some of the weakest sections of society for them to upgrade or construct the house of respectable quality for their personal living. The vision of the government is to replace all temporary (kutcha ) houses from Indian villages by 2017 (house in which 0, 1, 2 wall are kutcha with kutcha roof..

== Implementation ==
The funds are allocated to the states based on 75% weightage of rural housing shortage and 25% weightage of poverty ratio. The housing shortage is as per the official published figures of Registrar General of India based on the 2001 Census.

A software called "AWAAS Soft" was launched in July 2010 to assist in improved administration of this scheme.

A new survey was conducted in 2018 and the beneficiaries were selected.

== The Scheme’s Criteria to Benefit Public By 3 Installments ==
1. 15,000 – After the house got sanctioned by Panchayat Samiti level
2. 45,000 – When Plinth level (3 Fit) & Foundation level was completed.
3. 60,000 – when Roof Level was completed with the completed door, windows.

The installments release by DBT (Direct Beneficiary Transfer) from ABPS (Aadhaar Based Payment System) by PFMS (Public Financial Management System).

== Eligibility ==
All the below categories are automatically included under Pradhan Mantri Gramin Awas Yojana.

- List of kutcha house under Pradhan Mantri Gramin Awas Yojana is prepared on the basis of Housing deprivation parameter in the Socio economic and caste census 2011.
- Then this list is confirmed by the gram Shabhas and panchayat level, they will make deletion or addition of any household who is left outside parameters of SECC 2011.
- Kutcha houses having 0, 1, 2 rooms with kutcha roof are included under Pradhan Mantri Gramin Awas Yojana.
- Households without any shelter are covered Pradhan Mantri Gramin Awas Yojana.
- Destitute living on the alms are covered under Pradhan Mantri Gramin Awas Yojana l.
- Manual scavenger are also included.
- Primitive tribal groups are included under Pradhan Mantri Gramin Awas Yojana.
- Legally released bounded laborers are covered under Pradhan Mantri Gramin Awas Yojana.

=== Who is not eligible ===
13 parameters set by the government of India exclude households or individuals from this program:

1. Household having three or four wheeler and motorized boat;
2. Household having mechanized three or four wheeler agriculture or allied equipment;
3. Kisan credit card holder having limit of 50,000 rupees;
4. Household having any government employee;
5. Any member of the family is earning more than 15,000 rupees per month;
6. Anyone who is paying income tax;
7. Professional tax payers;
8. Anyone who owns a landline phone;
9. Anyone who owns a refrigerator;
10. Landholder of more than 2.5 acres of irrigated land;
11. Landholder of 5 acres or more irrigated land for 2 or more crop seasons;
12. Household having total land of 7.5 acres (both irrigated or non irrigated);
13. Household with kutcha house of 0, 1, 2 rooms and kutcha roof.

== Current provisions ==
As per the 2011 budget, the total funds allocated for IAY have been set at ₹100 billion (US$1.0 billion) for construction of houses for BPL families with special focus on the Left Wing Extremist (LWE) districts.

Under the Pradhan Mantri Gramin Awas Yojana 2020, the Central Government is providing financial assistance of Rs.1,20,000 for building of pucca house on flat land and the Government is providing financial assistance of Rs.1,30,000 for construction of pucca house in hilly area.

== Impact ==
Since 1985, 25.2 million houses have been constructed under the scheme. Under the Bharat Nirman Phase 1 project, 6 million houses were targeted and 7.1 million actually constructed from 2005–06 to 2008–09. Additional, 12 million houses are planned to be constructed or renovated under the Bharat Nirman Phase 2.

According to the official 2001 figures, the total rural housing shortage was 14.825 million houses.

== PMAY-G New Awaas+ Survey Begins from 1 January 2025 ==
The Pradhan Mantri Awaas Yojana-Gramin (PMAY-G) is a flagship rural housing scheme by the Government of India, aimed at providing "Housing for All" by 2022. The scheme has been extended to 2028-29, with a target to construct an additional 2 crore houses.

In 2025, a new survey is being conducted to identify additional eligible rural households. This survey is facilitated through the Awaas+ 2024 Mobile App, which allows for both self-surveys and assisted surveys by pre-registered surveyors. The app was launched on September 17, 2024, and available on 28 December 2024 and has already seen over 2 lakh surveyors and field functionaries

== See also ==
- Housing for All scheme in India
- Bharat Nirman
- Union budget of India
- 2011 Union Budget of India
- Minister of Rural Development (India)
