= T App Folio =

Official app of the government of Telangana, India

- Developer: Government of Telangana
- Release: February 2017; 9 years ago
- Operating system: Android, iOS, Windows, USSD
- Available in: 2 Languages of India
- Type: Online service provider, DigiLocker, Bill Payment System
- License: Freeware, proprietary
- Website: www.telangana.gov.in/Pages/News/PromotedNews/T-App-Folio.aspx

T App Folio is an integrated app for government to citizen provided by Government of Telangana in India. The service, as a part of Mee Seva 2.0, an integrated app that provides services like Mee Seva services, RTA services, fee payments and bill payment services etc. It is available in Telugu and English.

== History ==
It was launched on 28 February 2018 by IT minister of Telangana, K. T. Rama Rao.

== Services ==
Around 150 services including the most used services like MeeSeva, RTA services, fee payments and bill payments.

Other informational services like location services like MeeSeva centers, Ration shops, Hy-Fi hotspots are available on the app.

== Platform ==
The platform supports single sign on feature for using multiple services in on go. It is now extended to mobile platform under M-Governance. T app folio is an app with 180 services from various departments bundled into one single app, similar to Government of India’s, UMANG.
