= Achyut Madhav Gokhale =

Indian civil servant (1946–2021)

- Born: 3 January 1946; India
- Died: 18 April 2021 (aged 75); Pune
- Education: University of Mumbai
- Occupation: IAS officer
- Employer: Government of India
- Organization: Indian Administrative Service
- Awards: Padma Shri

Achyut Madhav Gokhale (3 January 1946 – 18 April 2021) was an Indian civil servant (former Indian Administrative Service officer), writer and a former Secretary to the Government of India at the Ministry of Non Conventional Energy Sources, known for his contributions towards the government initiatives such as Village Development Boards and Jawahar Rozgar Yojana.

== Biography ==
He was an executive director of the MS Swaminathan Research Foundation, a former Chief Secretary of the state of Nagaland and a former chairman of the Genetic Engineering Approval Committee of the Ministry of Environment and Forests. Born on 3 January 1946, Gokhale graduated with a degree in physics from the University of Mumbai in 1965, entered the Indian Administrative Service in 1968 from the Nagaland cadre and served various government offices until his superannuation in January 2006. During his tenure with the Government of Nagaland, he is known to have launched a people's programme, Nagaland Empowerment of People through Economic Development (NEPED), which had reported success in getting the involvement of the people of Nagaland. The Government of India awarded him the fourth highest civilian award of Padma Shri in 1990.

Gokhale died on 18 April 2021, aged 75, due to COVID-19.

== See also ==
- Sampoorna Grameen Rozgar Yojana
- MS Swaminathan Research Foundation
