= The Assam Tenancy Act, 2021 =

Assam Legislative Assembly
- Long title: An Act to establish a Rent Authority to regulate the renting of premises and to protect the interests of landlords and tenants and to provide a speedy adjudication mechanism for resolution of disputes and matters connected therewith or incidental thereto.
- Citation: Assam Act No. XXXI of 2021
- Territorial extent: State of Assam
- Passed by: Assam Legislative Assembly
- Passed: 13 August 2021
- Assented to by: Governor of Assam
- Royal assent: 23 September 2021
- Commenced: By notification in the Official Gazette
- Bill citation: Assam Tenancy Bill, 2021
- Introduced by: Ashok Singhal, Minister of Housing and Urban Affairs

Repeals
- Assam Urban Areas Rent Control Act, 1972
- Status: In force

The Assam Tenancy Act, 2021 (Assam Act No. XXXI of 2021) is an Act of the Assam Legislative Assembly that regulates the renting of premises in the Indian state of Assam and provides a mechanism for the resolution of disputes between landlords and tenants. The Act establishes a Rent Authority to regulate the rental of residential and commercial premises and to protect the interests of both landlords and tenants.

The Assam Legislative Assembly passed the legislation on 13 August 2021, making Assam the first state in India to adopt a tenancy law modelled on the Union government's Model Tenancy Act. The Bill received the assent of the Governor of Assam on 23 September 2021 and was published in the Assam Gazette (Extraordinary) on 1 October 2021. On its commencement, the Act repeals the Assam Urban Areas Rent Control Act, 1972.

== Background ==
Rental relations in urban Assam were earlier governed by the Assam Urban Areas Rent Control Act, 1972, which imposed controls on the rent that could be charged. In 2021 the Union Ministry of Housing and Urban Affairs circulated a Model Tenancy Act for adoption by states and union territories, with the aim of creating a more balanced and market-driven rental housing framework. Assam became the first Indian state to adopt and enact legislation based on this model.

Introducing the legislation, the state's Minister for Housing and Urban Affairs, Ashok Singhal, said the Act was intended to ease the renting-out process and to address long-pending disputes between landlords and tenants that had accumulated in the civil courts.

== Legislative history ==
The Bill was passed by the Assam Legislative Assembly on 13 August 2021. It was moved by Minister of Parliamentary Affairs Pijush Hazarika on behalf of the Minister of Urban Development, Ashok Singhal. The Bill received the assent of the Governor of Assam on 23 September 2021 and was published in the Assam Gazette (Extraordinary) on 1 October 2021 as Assam Act No. XXXI of 2021. Under the Act, the State Government may bring its provisions into force by notification in the Official Gazette, and different dates may be appointed for different provisions.

== Provisions ==
=== Objectives and scope ===
The Act extends to the whole of the State of Assam. Its stated objects are to establish a Rent Authority to regulate the renting of premises, to protect the interests of landlords and tenants, and to provide a speedy adjudication mechanism for the resolution of disputes.

=== Tenancy agreements ===
The Act requires that, after its commencement, no premises may be let or taken on rent except by a written agreement, which the landlord and tenant must jointly inform to the Rent Authority within two months of the date of the agreement. Sub-letting or assignment of tenancy rights is permitted only through a supplementary agreement, which must similarly be reported to the Rent Authority.

=== Rent and dispute resolution ===
The Act moves away from the imposition of a statutory ceiling on rent, allowing rent to be fixed by mutual agreement between the landlord and the tenant rather than by an artificial cap. It establishes a three-tier quasi-judicial structure for dispute resolution, comprising district-level Rent Authorities and Rent Courts and a state-level Rent Tribunal. Civil courts are barred from exercising jurisdiction over matters covered by the Act.

=== Exemptions ===
Certain categories of premises are excluded from the Act, including premises owned or promoted by the central or state government, government undertakings, statutory bodies and cantonment boards; premises owned by a company, university or organisation and let to its employees as part of a service contract; and premises owned by specified religious or charitable institutions. Parties to such excepted tenancies may, however, opt to be governed by the Act by informing the Rent Authority.

== Reception ==
Commentators noted that, by dismantling rent control and replacing it with a market-based framework and a dedicated dispute-resolution mechanism, the Act had the potential to rationalise the rental housing sector and to build confidence among property owners. As the first state law of its kind in India, the legislation was widely reported as a template that other states might follow.

== See also ==
- Model Tenancy Act
- Assam Urban Areas Rent Control Act, 1972
- Renting
- Rent regulation
