= National Health Claims Exchange =

Health insurance claim processing portal in India

National Health Claims Exchange (NHCX) is an online system for processing health insurance claims in India.

== Overview ==
In 2023, India's National Health Authority (NHA), the organization implementing the Ayushman Bharat Yojana and Ayushman Bharat Digital Mission, aimed to create an unified portal for hospitals nationwide to process claims with nearly 50 insurance providers. The NHCX aims to standardize and simplify the exchange of health claims, making it easier for insurance companies, government schemes, and healthcare providers like hospitals and labs to share data, documents, and images. This system also aims to make claims processing more transparent and efficient, lowering operational costs.

== Operations ==
Like internet and email networks, the NHCX allows data packets to be transferred between different points, ensuring "interoperability" of health claims processing. The platform went online in June 2024 when it processed its first claim.
