= Ram Sewak Sharma =

Indian academic and retired bureaucrat

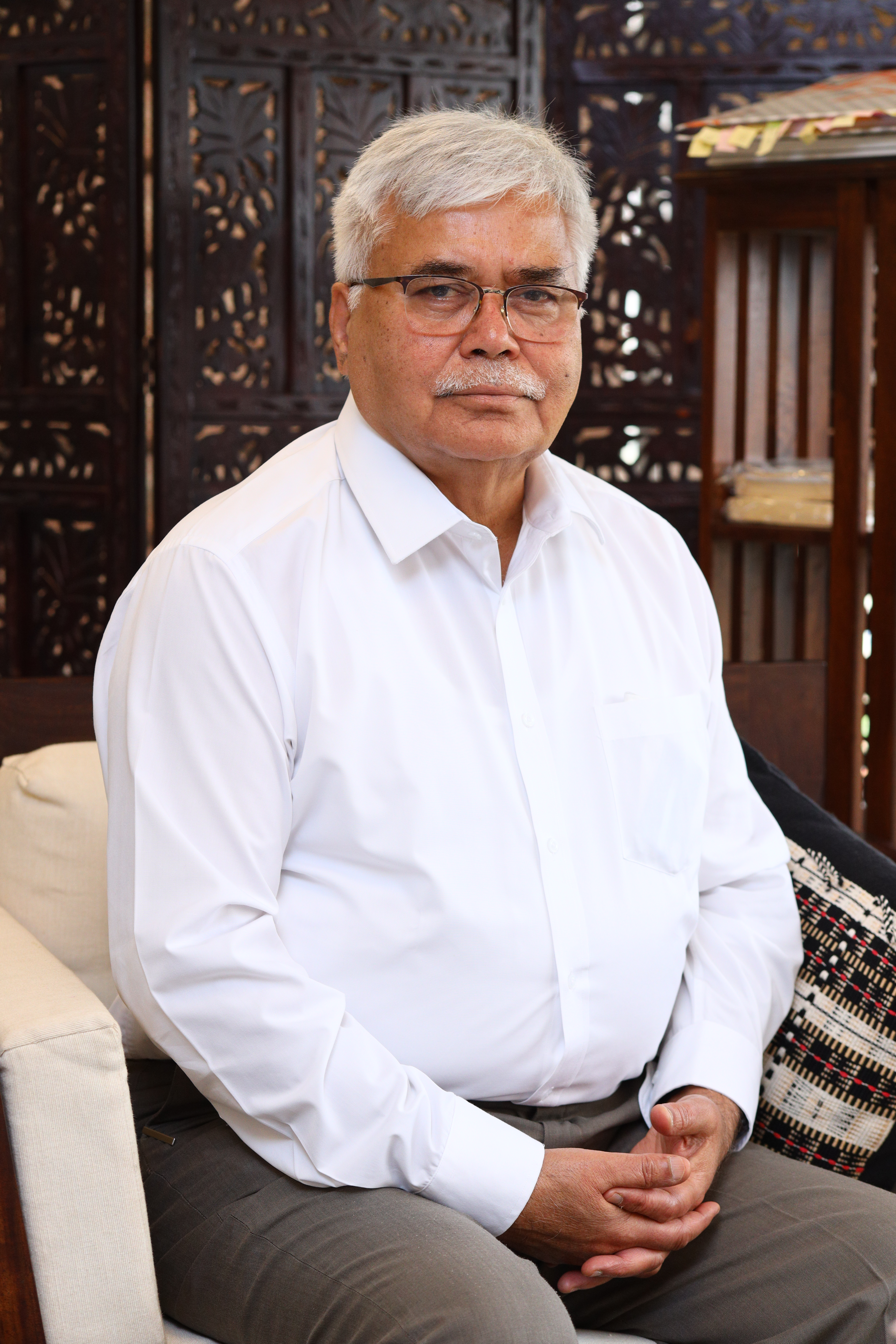
- Ram Sewak Sharma

CEO, National Health Authority
- In office 1 February 2021 – 31 January 2023
- Preceded by: Indu Bhushan
- Succeeded by: Dipti Gaur Mukharjee

Chairman, Telecom Regulatory Authority of India
- In office 20 August 2015 – 30 September 2020
- Preceded by: Rahul Khullar
- Succeeded by: PD Vaghela

Director General, Unique Identification Authority of India
- In office 31 July 2009 – 31 March 2013
- Preceded by: Position Established
- Succeeded by: Vijay Madan

Personal details
- Born: 1 October 1955 (age 71)
- Education: University of Allahabad; IIT Kanpur; University of California Riverside
- Occupation: Retired Civil servant

Ram Sewak Sharma (born 1 October 1955) is a retired Indian bureaucrat and former civil servant. He is currently a Distinguished Visiting Professor at the Indian Institute of Technology (IIT Kanpur), where he teaches Technology and Policy. He also served as the non-executive Chairperson of Open Network for Digital Commerce (ONDC), a non-profit organisation aimed at fostering digital commerce.

In the past, he has served as the chief executive officer of the National Health Authority, an Indian governmental organisation tasked with managing public health insurance; the Chairperson of Telecom Regulatory Authority of India; and the first Director General of the Unique Identification Authority of India.

== Early life and education ==
Born in a small village of Uttar Pradesh, he completed his early education from schools near his village. He joined University of Allahabad from where he earned his Bachelor of Science (BSc). He completed his master's in Mathematics from IIT, Kanpur, in 1978. While on leave from the Government of India, he earned a master's in computer science from University of California, Riverside in 2002 and subsequently a PhD from IIT, Delhi.

== Career ==
Ram Sewak Sharma joined the Indian Administrative Service (IAS) in 1978.He belongs to the Jharkhand cadre. In 1986, he wrote a program in DBASE, a programming language that would keep a record of all stolen firearms in the crime-prone district. As soon as a firearm would be found, the programme would run a search query among thousands of age-old records. This software enabled the solving of 22 cases in just 30 days.

He held responsibilities in his home cadre of Jharkhand as well as in ministries of the Central government, including, as Secretary, Department of Electronics and Information Technology and Chief Secretary of Jharkhand .

=== UIDAI ===
As the first Director General of the Unique Identification Authority of India, he helped create the 12-digit identity number, called Aadhaar, which is available to all eligible residents in India. He has authored a book titled The Making of Aadhaar: World's Largest Identity Platform (ISBN 9390356121) describing this project.

=== TRAI ===
He was appointed the Chairman of Telecom Regulatory Authority of India (TRAI) from August 2015 for a period of three years. At the end of this tenure, he was given a further extension of two years. As Chairman of TRAI, he steered the adoption of net neutrality regulations in India. He has taken measures to enable consumer choice in determining market outcomes, e.g. a new framework for broadcasting and cable services, regulations for mobile number portability, and the use of crowd-sourced information or field measurements to inform customers. As the TRAI chairman, his goal to gradually reduce Interconnect Usage Charges earned him acclaim from some and criticism from others. Critics allege that the decision is biased towards Jio while those defending TRAI claim that reducing these charges was necessary for the continuous growth of the sector.

=== CoWIN ===
He is the chairperson of an empowered committee for administration of COVID-19 vaccine delivery technology platform (Co-WIN). CoWIN along with the national COVID-19 vaccination campaign was launched by the Prime Minister on January 16, 2021. Dr. Sharma was called back from retirement to take the responsibility of developing and executing the CoWIN or the COVID-19 Vaccine Intelligence Network. India crossed a mark of administering 2 billion vaccinations in July, 2022. The country also signed an MoU with the government of the Co-operative Republic of Guyana for sharing CoWIN.

Dr. Sharma also served on the National Expert Group on Vaccine Administration for COVID-19, a body constituted by the Government of India to tackle the COVID-19 pandemic in India.

=== NHA ===
In February 2021, Sharma was appointed as the chief executive officer of the National Health Authority of India, a body responsible for implementing two health initiatives of the Government of India, Ayushman Bharat Jan Arogya Yojana (AB PM-JAY) which is a public health insurance scheme and Ayushman Bharat Digital Mission, a platform to promote digitization of healthcare in India and served the office till January 2023.

== Controversies ==
In 2018, Sharma dismissed concerns regarding privacy and potential misuse of India's national biometric ID, and disclosed his Aadhar number on twitter, challenging users to “do any harm to me.” and stating that the purpose of the challenge was "... to debunk the theory that Aadhaar compromises the privacy of the person.” Following this, individual researchers were able to locate his personal address, the number of the mobile phone he used as well as an alternate phone number that he used, his WhatsApp profile picture, his voter identification card and his tax identification card (PAN card). Sharma dismissed these disclosures on Twitter, stating that the information could not be used to harm him. The information was used to make a symbolic deposit of ₹1 in one of his bank accounts, to demonstrate the potential for misuse. The UIDAI made a statement indicating that this personal information concerning Mr. Sharma was already in the public domain. In December 2020, Sharma's Aadhar number was used to fraudulently register him for an agricultural benefit scheme, the PM Kisan Yojana, as a result of which benefits that he was not eligible for were deposited into his account. Sharma has blamed the state government for failing to conduct adequate verification.

== Awards ==
- Voice and Data "Telecom Person of the Year" award for his role in balancing the interests of the telecom industry and consumers - 2019
- Voice & Data Lifetime Achievement Award - 2022
- Economic Times Telecom Award for Lifetime Achievement - 2022

Recognition for CoWIN platform developed under his leadership

- In 2021, Voice & Data recognized CoWIN as a "Pathbreaker" for its role in the vaccination drive during the COVID-19 pandemic.
- In 2023, CoWIN received the Global Game Changer Award from Marico Foundation, recognizing its innovative use of technology to facilitate the vaccination process.
