= ISPIRT =

Indian software industry think tank

iSPIRT
- Formation: February 4, 2013; 13 years ago
- Purpose: Think tank
- Region served: India
- Website: Official website

Indian Software Products Industry Round Table (iSPIRT), is a think tank for the Indian software products industry.

== History ==
iSPIRT was officially launched on 4 February 2013, though preparatory work had been done over the preceding year. It was founded as an offshoot of NASSCOM. Around June 2017, some key members quit iSPIRT after co-founder Sharad Sharma, who was associated with an emphasis on Aadhaar and India Stack, admitted to online trolling of anti-Aadhaar advocates, leading to dissent and resignations among those concerned with the organisation's governance and direction.

== Activities ==
The think tank claims its aim is to help software product companies with policies, playbooks and market catalysts, describing its three pillars as:

1. Policy - converting ideas into policy proposals to take to government stakeholders
2. Playbooks - converting conversations into playbooks for product entrepreneurs
3. Market Catalysts - converting actions of self-help communities into market catalysts for the Software Product Industry.

=== India Stack ===
iSPIRT has been involved in promoting India Stack applications and has been acknowledged by the United States Agency for International Development for initiating the project.

=== OCEN ===
Open Credit Enablement Network or OCEN is a lending ecosystem where any company dealing with consumers and small or medium sized industries can become a loan service provider. Government eMarketplace (GeM) and private load providers who are part of OCEN can use account aggregator system for data-sharing of financial data.

== Concerns and controversies ==
There have been concerns with the arguably close links between India Stack, Aadhaar, India's personal digital identity system, and the Government; with legal researcher Usha Ramaanthan explaining "The same people who worked within the government to set the framework for Aadhaar went on to create products in the private sector to harness its commercial potential – a clear case of conflict of interest." Furthermore in 2017, iSPIRT's Sharad Sharma admitted to anonymous trolling of Aadhaar critics.

Rohin Dharmakumar, writing for The Ken, claimed of iSPIRT: "In two short years, they built a world-class example of a volunteer-driven industry think tank with hundreds of passionate volunteers," but by September 2017, "India Stack is the dominant gene in iSPIRT. And iSPIRT’s original mission seems a relic".
