= CoWIN =

Indian Government COVID-19 vaccination portal

Co-WIN
- Website type: National government portal
- Available in: English, Hindi, Marathi, Malayalam, Bengali, Kannada, Telugu, Tamil, Punjabi, Odia, Assamese, Gujarati
- Owner: Government of India
- Website: cowin.gov.in
- Commercial: No
- Registration: Required
- Launched: 16 January 2021; 5 years ago
- Current status: Active

CoWIN (Covid Vaccine Intelligence Network) is an Indian government web portal for COVID-19 vaccination registration, owned and operated by India's Ministry of Health and Family Welfare. It displays booking slots of COVID-19 vaccine available in the nearby areas and can be booked on the website. The site also provides vaccination certificates to the beneficiaries, which act as vaccine passports for the beneficiaries and can be stored in Digilocker. Users can access the platform via desktop, tablet, and mobile phones.

== About ==
CoWIN serves the function of registration, appointment scheduling, identity verification, vaccination and certification of each vaccinated member. Registration for the vaccination slots can be booked on the same day or a few days prior. The platform has also been integrated in the Aarogya Setu and UMANG Apps. The certificate after COVID-19 vaccination can also be obtained through the platform. To expedite the development of this platform, several existing digital assets were leveraged, such as: Electronic Vaccine Intelligence Network (eVIN), Digital Infrastructure for Vaccination Open Credentialing (DIVOC), DigiLocker, Surveillance and Action for Events Following Vaccination (SAFE-VAC). CoWIN application was developed with five modules: the orchestration module; the vaccination cold chain module; the citizen registration module; the vaccinator module; and the certificate, feedback, and adverse event following immunization reporting module. As of now, eight vaccines can be registered on the platform in the country Covishield (18+), Covaxin (15+), Corbevax (12-14), Sputnik V (18+), Corbevax (12-14), Gemcovac (18+) Incovacc (18+), ZyCoV-D (18+) and Covovax (12+).

In the future, the Health ministry is working on upgrading CoWIN for the effective implementation of India's universal immunization programme. Co-WIN platform will be used for booking slots for the routine vaccinations like Polio and Hepatitis. This will allow healthcare professionals to digitally track the immunization status of beneficiaries (mother and children) on a real-time basis and address the vaccination needs immediately.

Doctors and medical professionals may soon be able to manage appointments and maintain patient records over the vaccine platform CoWIN, with the National Health Authority (NHA) integrating it with the Ayushman Bharat Digital Health Mission (ABDM)—the backbone of India's digital healthcare system. This lightweight health management information system (HMIS) solution will allow small clinics and providers to manage appointments, patient information and prescriptions. The HMIS will be integrated with all ABDM modules and allow the doctor and clinic to create a health professional ID and a health facility ID.

== History ==
Prime Minister, Narendra Modi had envisioned roll-out of a technology based citizen facing platform for smooth running of COVID-19 vaccination in India, long back in May 2020. The government repurposed its eVIN platform and tested it in more than 700 districts before the launch of CoWIN. However, the PM sensed that the technological backbone would need more robustness and decided to revive the team that had delivered Aadhaar and brought Dr RS Sharma on board who previously headed the Telecom Regulatory Authority of India and the Unique Identification Authority of India. Within days, Sharma was appointed Chair of the Empowered Group of technology and Data management and member of National Expert Group on Vaccine Administration(NEGVAC), a body constituted by the Government of India and also the CEO of the National Health Authority (NHA).

CoWIN software was designed by Trigyn Technologies and KPMG India was hosted on Amazon Web Services.

On 16 January 2021, CoWIN was launched and started offering COVID-19 vaccination for Frontline Workers in the country.

On 1 March 2021, the platform started offering vaccination to all residents over the age of 60, residents between the ages of 45 and 60 with one or more qualifying comorbidities, and any health care or frontline worker that did not receive a dose during phase 1.

From 1 April 2021, eligibility was extended to all residents over the age of 45. Registration for the next phase began on 28 April 2021 for 1 May 2021, extending eligibility to all residents over the age of 18.

On 28 June 2021, it was announced that an open source version will be given to over 50 interested countries. CoWIN has been the fastest growing tech platform in the world. India has also signed an MoU with the government of the Co-operative Republic of Guyana for sharing CoWIN.

On 17 September 2021, CoWIN handled the volume of 25 million doses in 24 hours without any glitches.

On 21 October 2021, according to the CoWIN portal, India crossed 1 billion doses.

From 3 January 2022, eligibility was extended for the citizens above 15 years of age, for which registration started from 1 January 2022, on CoWIN. Currently Covaxin, Corbevax, Covovax vaccine is approved for 15-18 age group.

From 10 January 2022, COVID booster dose drive has been started for frontline workers, 60+ people with comorbidities, healthcare workers and workers on election duty. Either they can visit the vaccination center or book the slot on CoWIN Platform. Booster (precaution dose) will only be given with same shots as prior, and there should be gap of nine to twelve months from 2nd shot.

India crossed a mark of administering 2 billion vaccinations in July, 2022 which includes, dose 1, 2 and precaution dose.

As of January 2023, there are more than 1 billion registrations on the CoWIN Portal, with 5132 public and private health facilities providing slots for vaccinations.

== See also ==
- COVID-19 vaccination in India
- COVID-19 vaccine
