= Bharat Connect =

Integrated bill payment system in India

- Operating area: India
- Founded: 2013; 13 years ago
- Owner: NPCI
- Website: www.bharat-connect.com

Bharat Connect is an integrated bill payment system in India offering interoperable and accessible bill payment service to customers through a network of agents of registered members as Agent Institutions (AI), enabling multiple payment modes, and providing instant confirmation of payment.

National Payments Corporation of India (NPCI) functions as the authorized Bharat Bill Payment Central Unit (BBPCU), which will be responsible for setting business standards, rules and procedures for technical and business requirements for all the participants and requirement. NPCI, as the BBPCU, will also undertake clearing and settlement activities related to transactions routed through Bharat Connect. Existing bill aggregators and banks are envisaged to work as Operating Units to provide an interoperable bill payment system, irrespective of which unit has on-boarded a particular biller. Payments may be made through the Bharat Connect using cash, transfer cheques, and electronic modes. Bharat Connect has also been integrated with the Unified Payments Interface (UPI) for instant payments through UPI enabled smartphones.

== Background ==
The Committee headed by RBI Executive Director G. Padmanabhan was set up in 2013 to study the feasibility of implementation of Giro-based payment systems. It had estimated that over 30,800 million bills amounting to ₹6223 billion are generated each year in the top 20 cities in the country.

It was felt that an integrated bill payment system is required in the country that could offer interoperable and accessible bill payment services to customers through a network of agents, allow multiple payment modes, and provide instant confirmation of payment. This should also serve as an efficient, cost-effective alternative to the existing systems and enhance consumer confidence and experience.

On 6 August 2022, the Reserve Bank of India (RBI) allowed BBPS cross border inward billing facility for non-resident Indians. NRIs can now directly pay utility bills, education fees, municipal tax and insurance-related payments without the need to send money first to a resident Indian bank account. The facility became active from 13 September 2022. On 20 September, RBI governor Shaktikanta Das officially launched Bharat BillPay Cross-Border Bill Payments at Global Fintech Fest 2022.

At the Global Fintech Fest (GFF) 2024, Vivek Deep, executive director of the Reserve Bank of India (RBI), announced the rebranding of the Bharat Bill Payment System (BBPS) to Bharat Connect.

=== Unified Presentment Management System ===
NPCI on 4 January 2022 launched Unified Presentment Management System (UPMS) for recurring payment. Customers can set up standing instructions for any mode of payment. The payment will be done automatically in terms of auto-debit and bill payment management. UPMS will help in payment of mutual funds, insurance, subscriptions, school fee payments etc.

=== Banking Connect ===
Banking Connect is an interoperable payment system designed to transform online merchant payments by resolving long-standing issues such as fragmented integrations, non-standardized settlements, and inefficient dispute resolution. It enables a single, unified integration between banks and payment aggregators (PAs), eliminating the need for multiple point-to-point connections. The initiative was introduced at this year’s Global Fintech Fest, marking a major step toward simplifying and standardizing digital payment infrastructure. The pilot phase includes leading banks such as HDFC Bank, SBI, Federal Bank, AU Small Finance Bank, and ICICI Bank, along with payment gateways including SBI ePay, Pine Labs, and Razorpay.

== See also ==
- India Stack
- Aadhar
- Indian passport
- Immediate Payment Service
- Merchant account
- National Payments Corporation of India
- Permanent account number
- Indian ration card
- RuPay
- Unified Payments Interface
