= Bharat Nirman =

Indian rural development program

- Country: India
- Prime Minister(s): Dr. Manmohan Singh

The Bharat Nirman Yojana was a flagship program launched in 2005 by the United Progressive Alliance government under the leadership of then-Prime Minister Dr. Manmohan Singh. It was designed as a time-bound initiative to build and upgrade rural infrastructure in India, aiming to improve the quality of life in villages and boost rural development.

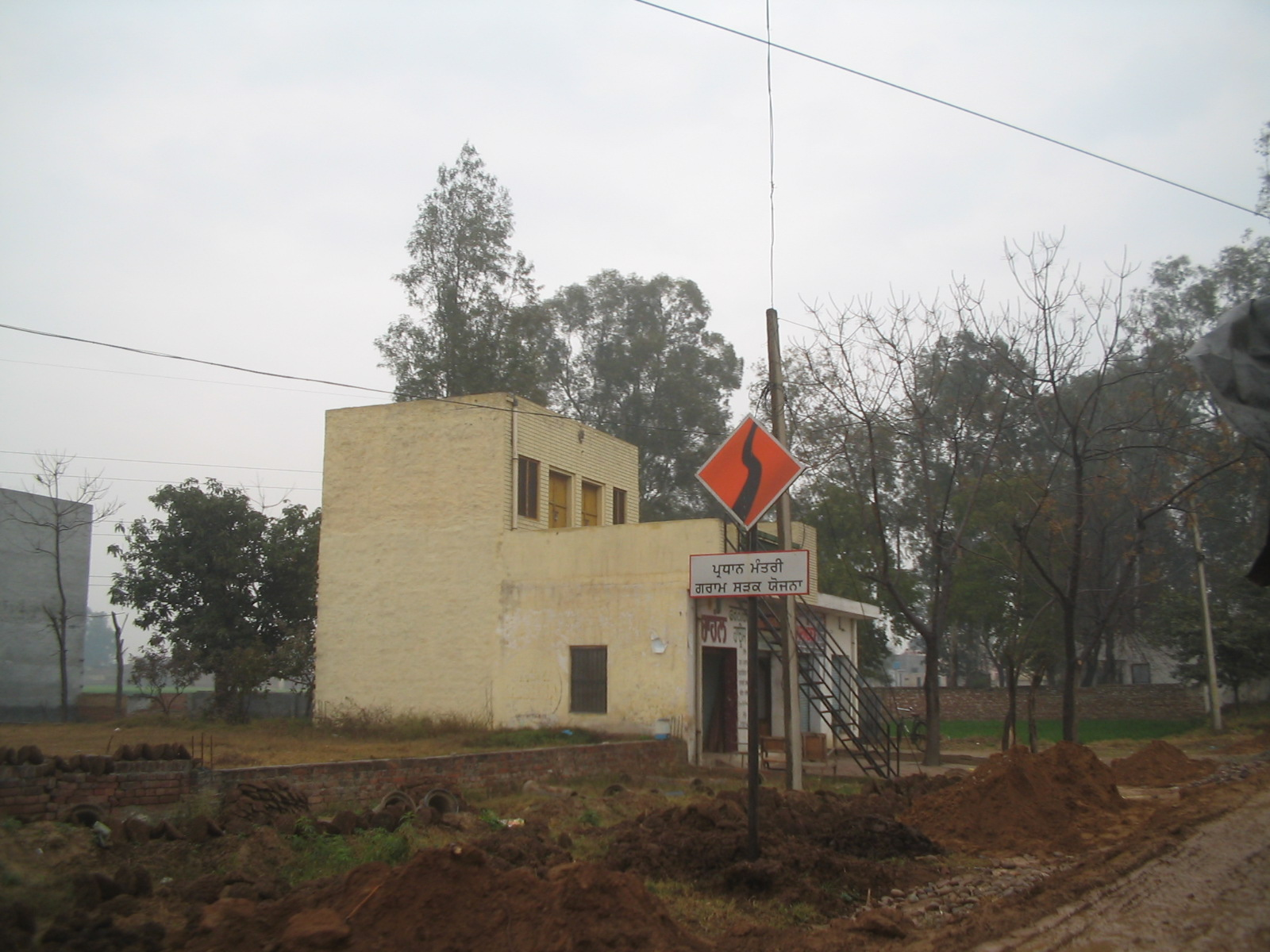
Pradhan Mantri Gram Sadak Yojana marker in a village in Punjab

It comprises projects on irrigation, roads (Pradhan Mantri Gram Sadak Yojana), housing (Indira Awaas Yojana), electrification (Rajiv Gandhi Grameen Vidyutikaran Yojana), water supply and telecommunication connectivity.

== Progress ==
By September 2007, significant progress was reported across its six components: Under the rural roads component, 48,215 km of roads were constructed to connect remote habitations. In housing, 36.81 lakh houses were built, progressing towards the target of 60 lakh. Drinking water initiatives focused on addressing contamination issues, covering 2,982 uncovered habitations and other affected areas. The irrigation segment aimed to create potential for 1 crore hectares, with a target of 28.50 lakh hectares for the fiscal year 2007-08. During the twelfth five-year plan, received a substantial budget allocation of 76,435 crore rupees from the Planning Commission in 2012.

The Pradhan Mantri Gram Sadak Yojana (PMGSY) was launched on 25 December 2000. The primary objective of PMGSY is to provide good quality all-weather roads in all the rural areas where urban-rural road connectivity is found to be very weak. All unconnected habitations with a population of more than 500 persons has been provided connectivity by 2007.
