= Rahul Khullar =

Indian civil servant (1953–2021)

Rahul Khullar IAS

Chairman Telecom Regulatory Authority of India
- In office 15 May 2012 – 14 May 2015
- Preceded by: J.S. Sarma
- Succeeded by: Ram Sewak Sharma

Personal details
- Born: 5 April 1953
- Died: 23 February 2021 (aged 67)
- Occupation: Civil Servant

Rahul Khullar (5 April 1953 – 23 February 2021) was an IAS officer of the 1975 batch and a former chairman of the Telecom Regulatory Authority of India (TRAI).

== Early life and education ==
Khullar was in the 1969 undergraduate batch in Economics at the St. Stephen's College, Delhi where he was a contemporary of economist Kaushik Basu and NITI Aayog Vice Chairman Rajiv Kumar. He completed his post-graduation from the Delhi School of Economics. He subsequently obtained a PhD in economics from Boston University after joining the Indian Administrative Service in 1975.

== Career ==
He was the secretary of the Ministry of Commerce and Trade prior to his selection as chairman of TRAI by the Appointments Committee of the Cabinet. He had a three-year term and one of the first orders of business for him was to sort out the various claims over the new auction and the 2G case. He was also a former Income Tax Commissioner. In recent years, he had been teaching economics and mathematics at Vasant Valley School in New Delhi, India.

== Personal life ==
He was married to IAS batchmate and former chairperson of Niti Aayog Sindhushree Khullar and they have two daughters.

== Death ==
He died on 23 February 2021, following a long illness.
