= Model Tenancy Act, 2019 =

Proposed tenancy law

The Model Tenancy Act, 2019 is a proposed tenancy law by the Government of India, designed to overhaul the tenancy market in India.

In 2019, finance minister Nirmala Sitharaman, spoke about creating the Model Tenancy Act to replace the archaic rental laws of the country, stating that "they do not address the relationship between the lessor and the lessee realistically and fairly". The Act seeks to solve the housing availability deficit and contribute to the Housing for All initiative by 2022.

The draft Act is currently under review by the states and union territories.

== Aspects ==
The Model Tenancy Act seeks to implement the following rules:

1. Formation of a Rent Authority department.
2. Residential housing security deposit is capped at two months' rent, and one month for non-residential tenancy.
3. Penalty on tenants for refusing to vacate the premises after the tenancy agreement expires or is mutually terminated.
4. Landlord must provide access to basic essentials and utilities, and cannot increase the property rent in the middle of an ongoing tenancy period.
5. Every executed tenancy agreement has to be reported to the Rent Authority within two months, and a unique identification number will be issued.
6. Terms of the tenancy agreement to be binding on the successors of both the landlord and the tenant.
7. Tenants cannot sublet the property without permission from the landlord.
8. Existing tenancies will not be affected by the Act.
