= Ayushman Bharat Digital Mission =

Government agency in India

The Ayushman Bharat Digital Mission (ABDM) is implemented by the National Health Authority (NHA) an agency of the Government of India. The ABDM aims to develop the backbone necessary to support the integrated digital health infrastructure of the country. It bridges the existing gap amongst different stakeholders of Healthcare ecosystem through digital highways. The Mission aims to create an integrated healthcare system that will link practitioners and patients digitally by giving them access to real-time health records. This will promote prompt and structured healthcare across the country leading to the creation of a national digital health ecosystem that supports universal health coverage in an efficient, accessible, inclusive, affordable, timely and safe manner.

To achieve this objective, digital building blocks in the form of digital public goods in federated architecture were commissioned. These are based on a range of data, information and infrastructure services, duly leveraging open, interoperable, standards-based digital systems that will ensure security, confidentiality and privacy of health-related personal information.

The program aligns with other government programs, including the Aadhaar identification program and the Ayushman Bharat Yojana healthcare program.

== Responses ==
Forbes remarked that because of the large population of India any precedent for data management in the NDHM (now renamed as ABDM) would establish a model for other national health programs to study.

Commentators for The Ken criticized the announcement of the program for being very expensive with no publicly stated plan for either allocating money to achieve it nor for sustainably funding it in the longer term.

== See also ==
- National Health Claims Exchange
