= Jal Jeevan Mission =

Schemes of government of India

Har Ghar Jal

Agency overview
- Formed: 2019
- Parent department: Jal Jeevan Mission
- Parent agency: Ministry of Jal Shakti
- Website: https://jaljeevanmission.gov.in/

Har Ghar Jal is a scheme initiated by the Ministry of Jal Shakti of Government of India under the Jal Jeevan Mission in 2019 with the aim to provide 55 litres of tap water to every rural household per capita per day regularly on a long-term basis by 2024. It is a restructuring of National Rural Drinking Water Programme (NRDWP) by Modi government in August 2019.

Indian Prime Minister Narendra Modi during his Independence Day speech on August 15, 2019, addressed the goal of providing potable water connections to rural households across India by 2024 under a budget of 3.60 lakh crores. In this the central government share is 2.08 lakh crore. The scheme envisages cost sharing in the ratio of 100:0 between Central Government-Union Territories, 90:10% between Central Government-North Eastern States/Himalayan State Governments and 50:50% between Central Government and other state governments.

== History ==
- In 1972, Central government assistance to states for rural water supply under the "Accelerated Rural Drinking Water Supply Scheme" launched.
- In 2009, the project was renamed as "National Rural Drinking Water Program" (NRDWP), making it a joint project between the central and state governments. One of the NRDWP's objectives is to "ensure that all households have access to safe and adequate drinking water as much as possible, a goal proposed to be achieved by 2030 in collaboration with the United Nations".
- As of now, the target is planned to be achieved by 2024 through the Jal Jeevan Mission (JJM). As per the information in DDWS, as on 31.3.2019, only 18.33% of rural households i.e. 3.27 crore out of total 17.87 crore rural households in the country have piped water connection.
- Finance Minister Nirmala Sitharaman announced the scheme in 2019 Union budget. In August 2019 National Rural Drinking Water Programme (NRDWP) was restructured by Modi government as Jal Jeevan Mission.
- Since its inception, the scheme has significantly improved household clean tap water availability in India. The government has also published website based dashboard to track the progress details of the mission.
- In August 2022, Goa and Dadra and Nagar Haveli and Daman and Diu became the first 'Har Ghar Jal' certified State and UT respectively with 100% tap-water access.

== Jal Jeevan Mission 2.0 ==
Jal Jeevan Mission 2.0 (JJM 2.0) is the extended and restructured phase of India's rural drinking water programme, approved by the Government of India on 22 March 2026. It builds upon the original Jal Jeevan Mission (launched in 2019) and aims to ensure tap water to rural household by 2028.

On 1 April 2026, Central Government released ₹1,561 crores under JJM 2.0 for five states, including ₹792.93 crore to Uttar Pradesh, ₹536.53 crore to Chhattisgarh, ₹154.02 for Madhya Pradesh and the remaining amount for Odisha and Maharashtra.

On 31 August 2026, four states; Assam, Jharkhand, Chhattisgarh, and Nagaland — achieved 100% functional household tap connection coverage in their urban areas under Jal Jeevan Mission (Urban), marking a significant milestone as all four had previously ranked among India's lowest-coverage states when the mission launched in 2019.

== Impact ==
- Rural India is now saving 5.5 crore hours a day in water fetching through this project, increasing labor participation and productivity, especially from women.
- The World Health Organization says nearly 400,000 deaths from diarrheal diseases are prevented because of a safely managed drinking water program for all households in the country.
- About 1.36 lakh child deaths can be prevented by providing safe drinking water to all rural households.

== Criticism ==
- A report by the Comptroller and Auditor General of India, tabled in the Gujarat Legislative Assembly on 11 September 2026, found that 88.64% of water samples tested in 48 villages across the state were unfit for consumption under the mission.
- The audit, covering implementation in the state from 2019–20 to 2023–24, also flagged delays of 3 to 25 months in several bulk pipeline projects and financial irregularities including ₹54.32 crore in excess contractor payments attributed to incorrect price-index calculations and ₹28.79 crore spent on items such as staff quarters and office buildings that it deemed inadmissible under the scheme.

== Statistics ==
Rural tap water connection
Year	Rural tap water connection (in crores)
2019 Aug	3.23
2020 Aug	5.32
2021 Aug	8.05
2022 Aug	10.04
2023 Aug	12.96
2024 Aug	15.11
2025 Aug	15.69

- Rural tap water connection % barchart

State	Total number of households	Households with water supply as of April 14, 2024	Percentage as of August 15, 2019	Percentage as of April 14, 2024	Year set to achieve 100% target						
State	Total number of households	Households with water supply as of April 14, 2024	Percentage as of August 15, 2019	Percentage as of April 14, 2024	Year set to achieve 100% target	Goa	263,002	263,002	75.7	100.00	2021
Telangana	53,98,219	53,98,219	29.113	100.00	2021						
Andaman & Nicobar Islands	62,037	62,037	46.016	100.00	2024						
Puduchery	1,14,908	1,14,908	81.33	100.00	2021						
Dadra and Nagar Haveli and Daman and Diu	85,156	85,156	0.00	100.00							
Haryana	30,41,314	30,41,314	58.08	100.00	2023						
Punjab	34,18,055	34,18,055	49.11	100.00	2022						
Gujarat	91,18,449	91,18,449	71.46	100.00	2023						
Bihar	1,66,29,634	1,60,34,628	1.90	96.42	2021						
Himachal Pradesh	17,08,727	1,708,727	44.64	100.00	2023						
Manipur	4,51,566	3,53,296	5.740	78.24	2022						
Maharashtra	1,46,71,746	1,25,13,721	33.01	85.29	2024						
Sikkim	1,33,147	1,17,912	52.83	88.56	2022						
Arunachal Pradesh	2,28,566	2,28,566	9.97	100	2023						
Mizoram	1,33,060	1,33,060	6.91	100	2023						
Uttarakhand	14,54,005	13,67,523	8.96	94.05	2022						
Andhra Pradesh	95,44,575	70,04,569	32.21	73.39	2024						
Jammu and Kashmir	18,71,488	14,47,088	30.75	77.32	2023						
Karnataka	1,01,14,843	76,88,890	24.226	76.02	2023						
Tripura	7,48,801	5,94,756	3.27	79.43	2023						
Tamil Nadu	1,25,23,029	1,02,71,639	17.38	82.02	2023						
Ladakh	40,808	37,723	3.47	92.44	2022						
Odisha	88,67,992	64,80,055	3.510	73.07	2024						
Nagaland	3,62,159	3,18,773	3.83	88.02	2024						
Madhya Pradesh	1,11,81,285	68,84,884	12.10	61.58	2024						
Kerala	70,80,541	37,17,974	23.542	52.51	2023						
Meghalaya	6,51,391	4,99,608	0.70	76.70	2023						
Assam	71,35,784	55,06,485	1.56	77.17	2024						
West Bengal	1,75,11,651	82,52,370	1.23	47.13	2024						
Chhattisgarh	50,00,306	39,01,291	6.39	78.02	2024						
Rajasthan	1,06,95,325	51,32,870	10.93	47.99							
Jharkhand	62,23,239	32,55,403	5.55	52.31	2024						
Uttar Pradesh	2,65,51,702	2,16,90,513	1.94	81.69	2022						
Total	19,30,29,941	14,66,54,447	16.77	75.97	2024						

== See also ==
- DigiLocker (easier access to online identity proof and services)
- One Nation, One Ration Card (food security card's national portability)
- Pradhan Mantri Awas Yojana (affordable housing for all)
- Saubhagya electrification scheme (electrification for all houses)
- Swachh Bharat (sanitation mission)
- Ujjwala Yojana (clean cooking gas connections for all)
- Pradhan Mantri Gram Sadak Yojana (for road development)
