= Digital public infrastructure =

Digital facilities and systems serving society

Digital public infrastructure (DPI) refers to digital systems and platforms that enable the delivery of services, facilitate data exchange, and support digital governance across various sectors. DPI includes elements such as digital identity systems, payment platforms, and data exchange protocols, designed to be scalable, interoperable, and accessible to both government and private sector participants. These infrastructures aim to support the functioning of public services, governance, and economic processes. It can also be understood as an intermediate layer in the digital ecosystem enabling applications across various public sectors.

Examples of DPI include India's Aadhaar system for digital identity, UPI for payments, and the India Stack data exchange framework. However, these systems have also faced criticism regarding privacy, mandatory participation requirements, and exclusion of vulnerable populations from welfare benefits due to authentication failures. Another example of digital public infrastructures is Estonia's X-Road, which is an open-source government data exchange system. Initiatives such as the German Sovereign Tech Fund provides funding for open digital infrastructure.

DPI plays a role in modernizing public services by supporting initiatives in areas like e-governance, health records management, and education. By ensuring the availability and operation of digital infrastructures, it can affect the efficiency of public service delivery and influence trust in digital systems. The implementation of DPI involves addressing issues related to privacy, data security, and equitable access. Critics argue that these concerns are often treated as implementation details rather than structural preconditions, with systems deployed before accountability mechanisms are established. The mandatory nature of some DPI systems has raised questions about whether they represent public goods or instruments of administrative control. DPI also implies governments taking more responsibility in the maintenance of the underlying technological stack for the digital public sphere to build a shared public infrastructure that prioritizes public values, democracy, and accessibility.

In the 2020s, discussion about digital public infrastructure has increased in prominence, with actors from both the public and private sectors endorsing its applications.

== History ==
The concept of treating digital systems as public infrastructure has evolved over decades. Early examples of DPI date back to foundational technologies like the Internet and GPS, which were publicly funded and made universally available. However, until recently, such systems were often siloed and not thought of as one cohesive public infrastructure.

The term "digital public infrastructure" itself gained prominence in the early 2020s, especially as countries started building integrated digital service platforms. India provided an early model for the concept: its government launched the Aadhaar digital ID system in 2010 (now the world's largest biometric ID database) and opened it up for use in both public and private services. This was followed by open digital payment platforms and data-sharing frameworks, collectively known as the India Stack. These were conceptualized as "government-owned, non-competing" digital utilities on which others could build services. Other nations had parallel developments: Estonia built its X-Road data exchange system in the 2000s, enabling government and private databases to talk to each other securely and laying the groundwork for the later development of Estonia's e-government services.

By the 2020s, thinkers and policymakers began explicitly using the infrastructure analogy, framing online services as critical infrastructure that should be broadly accessible, akin to public roads. In 2023, global consensus on a definition of DPI emerged. G20 leaders in 2023 welcomed a framework for systems of digital public infrastructure, describing DPI as shared, interoperable digital systems for service delivery at societal scale. During India's G20 presidency, world leaders agreed to describe digital public infrastructure as "a set of shared digital systems that are secure and interoperable, built on open standards, to deliver equitable access to public and/or private services at societal scale." That same year, the United Nations also identified DPI as a high-impact initiative for achieving the Sustainable Development Goals, with over 100 countries committing support.

== Criticism and concerns ==
=== Definitional ambiguity ===
Critics have noted that the term "digital public infrastructure" conflates two distinct meanings of "public": population-scale deployment versus public accountability and governance. A system may serve an entire population while remaining structurally unaccountable to those it affects. The G20 definition uses aspirational language ("should be," "can be") rather than verifiable structural conditions, leading scholars to argue that current definitions exclude nothing and therefore define nothing.

=== Privacy and surveillance ===
Digital public infrastructure systems have raised significant privacy concerns. Large-scale identity systems collect biometric data and transaction records that enable comprehensive surveillance of populations. Critics drawing on Shoshana Zuboff's analysis of surveillance capitalism argue that DPI systems, even when government-operated, can enable the commodification of personal data and behavioral prediction at population scale.

The mandatory nature of some DPI systems, where refusal results in exclusion from essential services, raises questions about whether consent can be freely given when the alternative is denial of food rations, banking, or healthcare.

=== Exclusion and the digital divide ===
DPI implementations have documented patterns of excluding vulnerable populations. In India, biometric authentication failures in the Aadhaar system have led to denial of food rations and welfare benefits, with reports linking such failures to deaths from starvation. The digital divide means that populations without reliable internet access, digital literacy, or stable biometrics (manual laborers, elderly people) face systematic exclusion from systems designed to serve them.

The assumption that digital systems improve efficiency can mask the creation of new barriers. Binary authentication (success or failure) replaces human discretion that previously allowed for edge cases and exceptions.

=== Commons governance ===
Scholars applying Elinor Ostrom's framework for common-pool resource governance have argued that most DPI systems fail the conditions required for legitimate commons management. Ostrom's design principles require that those affected by rules participate in making them, that monitoring be accountable to users, and that dispute resolution be accessible and low-cost. Critics observe that DPI systems typically invert these conditions: citizens are fully visible to the system while the system remains opaque to citizens; rules are set through executive or technocratic processes without meaningful public participation; and redress requires litigation rather than accessible local resolution.

=== Structural accountability ===
Some researchers distinguish between systems that are merely population-scale and those that are structurally accountable to affected populations. This perspective argues that genuine public infrastructure requires: the ability to refuse participation without penalty; transparent and inspectable execution; independent verification of system behavior; binding governance input from those affected; and the feasibility of alternative implementations. By these criteria, systems such as the Linux kernel, Let's Encrypt, and Wikipedia meet structural requirements for public infrastructure, while some systems promoted as DPI do not.
