= Pradhan Mantri Ujjwala Yojana =

Indian government energy scheme

Pradhan Mantri Ujjwala Yojana (PMUY)
- Ujjawala Yojana
- Country: India
- Prime Minister(s): Narendra Modi
- Ministry: Energy
- Key people: Dharmendra Pradhan
- Launched: 1 May 2016; 10 years ago Ballia
- Status: Active
- Website: www.pmujjwalayojana.com

Pradhan Mantri Ujjwala Yojana (PMUY, translation: Prime Minister's Lightening Scheme) was launched by Prime Minister of India Narendra Modi on 1 May 2016 to distribute 50 million LPG connections to women of Below Poverty Line (BPL) families. A budgetary allocation of ₹80 billion (US$830 million) was made for the scheme. The scheme was replaced by the Ujjwala Yojana 2.0 in 2021. Although the scheme has expanded access to clean cooking technologies, the use of polluting fuels remains common, particularly in rural India.

== Overview ==
In the first year of its launch, the connections distributed were 22 million against the target of 15 million. As of 23 October 2017, 30 million connections were distributed, 44% of which were given to families belonging to scheduled castes and scheduled tribes. The number crossed 58 million by December 2018.

In 2018 Union Budget of India, its scope was widened to include 80 million poor households. 21,000 awareness camps were conducted by oil marketing companies (OMC). The scheme led to an increase in LPG consumption by 56% in 2019 as compared to 2014.

The scheme has benefited over 14.6 million BPL families in Uttar Pradesh, 8.8 million in West Bengal, 8.5 million in Bihar, 7.1 million in Madhya Pradesh, 6.3 million in Rajasthan and 3.24 million in Tamil Nadu.

On 7 September 2019, Prime Minister Narendra Modi distributed a fuel cylinder to the 8th crore beneficiary under this scheme.

In the Union Budget of 2021–2022, the government announced that 1 crore more connections will be provided under this scheme. The Prime Minister launched the Ujjwala Scheme II on 10 August 2021 to provide fuel to 1 crore families who were left out of the first scheme.

At the 107th Indian Science Congress held in January 2020 in Bengaluru, Narendra Modi declared that technology has helped India "in recognizing the 8 crore [80 million] women who were still using coal or wood for cooking" and also "in understanding how many new distribution centres must be built, with the help of technology".

The National Family Health Surveys demonstrate significant improvement in access to cleaner cooking fuels due to PMUY. Yearly growth in access to cleaner fuel accelerated around 2015 and increased by almost seven times, from 0.8% in rural areas before 2015 to 5.6% after. The International Energy Agency termed Ujjwala Yojana a "game-changer in ending energy poverty".

India's Gas cylinder penetration has improved from 62 percent in May 2016 to 99.8 percent on 1 April 2021.

On 30 December 2023, Prime Minister Narendra Modi visited the home of the 10 crore beneficiary of the Ujjwala scheme.

Rajasthan CM Bhajan Lal Sharma announced that the rate of the cylinder will be Rs 450 in Rajasthan under Pradhan Mantri Ujjwala Yojana.

== Statistics ==
To increase the number of beneficiaries under the Ujjwala scheme, by renovating the structure, it is easy to bring the last mile beneficiaries under the scheme, so the government also tried to renovate the structures. Direct and indirect employments were also increased through it.

Item	1 Apr 2014	1 Apr 2022	Growth %
No. of Bottling plants in Nos.	186	202	9%
Bottling Capacity in TMPTA	13535	21573	59%

Item	1 Apr 2014	1 Apr 2022	Growth %
Total distributors	13896	25269	82%
Distributors Catering to rural areas	6724	17375	158%

Item	1 Apr 2014	1 Apr 2022	Growth %
Domestic Customers	14.52	30.53	110%
PMUY Customers	0	9	

Item	FY 2014–15	FY 2021–22	Growth %
Domestic LPG sales in TMT	16041	25502	59%
Total LPG sales including commercial in TMT	17639	28577	62%

== Ujjwala Scheme 1.0 State Wise Statistics ==
On 7 September 2019, the number of beneficiaries under Ujjwala Scheme I touched 8 crore. Number of beneficiaries state wise.

S.No	States / Union Territories	Number of connections released as on 31–03–2017	Number of connections released as on 22–05–2019	Total connection
1	Andaman & Nicobar Islands	1,189	7,878	9,067
2	Andhra Pradesh	63,428	3,43,221	4,06,649
3	Arunachal Pradesh		39,565	39,565
4	Assam	2	28,37,505	28,37,507
5	Bihar	24,76,953	78,98,945	10,375,898
6	Chandigarh		88	88
7	Chhattisgarh	11,05,441	26,92,109	37,97,550
8	Dadra and Nagar Haveli	3,211	14,106	17,317
9	Daman and Diu	73	423	496
10	Delhi	516	73,555	74,071
11	Goa	954	1,070	2,024
12	Gujarat	7,52,354	25,22,246	32,74,600
13	Haryana	2,78,751	6,79,727	9,58,478
14	Himachal Pradesh	1,601	1,12,889	1,14,490
15	Jammu and Kashmir	2,65,787	10,65,226	13,31,013
16	Jharkhand	5,36,912	28,92,151	34,29,063
17	Karnataka	15,840	28,20,262	28,36,102
18	Kerala	11,241	2,09,826	2,21,067
19	Lakshadweep	-	289	289
20	Madhya Pradesh	22,39,821	64,43,604	86,83,425
21	Maharashtra	8,58,808	40,70,602	49,29,410
22	Manipur	25	1,30,922	1,30,947
23	Meghalaya		1,40,252	1,40,252
24	Mizoram		25,722	25,722
25	Nagaland		49,462	49,462
26	Odisha	10,11,955	42,29,797	52,41,752
27	Puducherry	760	13,388	14,148
28	Punjab	2,45,008	12,08,880	14,53,888
29	Rajasthan	17,22,694	56,97,192	74,19,886
30	Sikkim		7,782	7,782
31	Tamil Nadu	2,72,749	31,47,742	34,20,491
32	Telangana	41	9,23,911	9,23,952
33	Tripura		2,38,221	2,38,221
34	Uttar Pradesh	55,31,159	1,29,59,693	1,84,90,852
35	Uttarakhand	1,13,866	3,52,768	4,66,634
36	West Bengal	25,20,479	80,61,694	1,05,82,173
	India	2,00,31,618	6,40,13,768	9,19,44,331

== Criticism ==
The effectiveness of the Ujjwala scheme has been questioned. Complaints of corruption included delayed installations, high consumption rates, and lack of data on environmental or women's benefits.

Almost 90 lakh beneficiaries refused refills due to high prices, and over 1.18 crore bought no refills, highlighting implementation failures.

== Ujwala Scheme Subsidy ==
The Cabinet approved a subsidy of Rs.200 per 14.2 kg LPG cylinder for up to 12 refills per year.The total expenditurewill be Rs.6,100 crore for financial year 2022-23 and Rs.7,680 crore for 2023–24. Average LPG consumption of PMUY consumers has increased by 20 percent from 3.01 refills in 2019–20 to 3.68 in 2021–22. Gross gas cylinder consumption increased to 3.71 in 2022-23 and 3.8 in 2023–24.

The government has increased the subsidy for poor women under the Ujjwala scheme to Rs. 300 per cylinder for the next financial year. The subsidy of Rs. 300 per cylinder was applicable for the current financial year, ending on March 31. Union Minister for Commerce and Industry, Piyush Goyal informed that the Economic Affairs Committee of the Cabinet has now decided to extend this subsidy until 2024–25.

== History ==
- On 16 October 2009, the Government of India launched the RGGLV (Rajiv Gandhi Gram LPG Vidarak Yojana) scheme, which aims to increase LPG penetration and establish LPG distributors in remote and inaccessible areas.
- In 2009, the government also launched a scheme to provide one-time financial assistance for LPG connections to Below Poverty Line (BPL) households. The assistance was provided through the Corporate Social Responsibility (CSR) Fund of the government's Oil Marketing Companies (OMCs).
- In 2015, Rajiv Gandhi Gram LPG Vidarak scheme was discontinued.
- From 2009 to 2016, 1.62 crore households were provided with LPG before the Ujjwala scheme.

On 31 March 2016, the subsidy for purchase of fuel given to below poverty line households through the Corporate Social Responsibility Fund was discontinued.

Yearwise India's LPG connection
Year	No of LPG Connection (in Cr)	No of PMUY Connection (in Cr)
1977	0.32	
1984	0.8	
1990	1.96	
2001	5.78	
2005	8	
2009		RGGLV Launched
2011	11.4	
2012	12.61	
2013	13.9	
2014	14.52	
2015	14.86	
2016	16.6	PMUY I launched
2017	19.9	2
2018	22.4	3.56
2019	26.5	7.18
2020	27.9	8.02
2021	28.9	8 (PMUY II Launched)
2022	30.5	8.99
2023	31.40	9.58
2024	32.42	10.32
2025	32.89	10.33

== See also ==
- Atal Pension Yojana (A pension Yojana)
- DigiLocker (easier access to online identity proof and services)
- Har ghar jal (water connection for each house)
- Pradhan Mantri Awas Yojana (affordable housing for all)
- Ration card (India) (food security card)
- Saubhagya scheme (electrification of all houses)
- Swachh Bharat Abhiyan (toilet for all houses)
