= Non-profit laws of India =

Laws related to non profit organisations in India

This article describes the various laws related to non profit organisations in India. A non profit organisation can be registered in India as a Society, under the Registrar of Societies or as a Trust, by making a Trust deed, or as a Section 8 Company, under the Companies Act, 2013.

Whether a trust, society or Section 8 company, the Income Tax Act, 1961 gives all categories equal treatment, in terms of exempting their income and granting 80G certificates, whereby donors to non-profit organisations may claim a rebate against donations made. Foreign contributions to non-profits are governed by FC(R)A regulations and the Home Ministry.

For an organisation to be termed as charity it requires Income tax clearances under 12A Section of Income Tax Act. Section 2(15) of the Income Tax Act defines ‘charitable purpose’ to include ‘relief of the poor, education, medical relief and the advancement of any other object of general public utility’. A purpose that relates exclusively to religious teaching or worship is not considered as charitable.

== Registration ==
A Non-Profit can be organized in India in the following ways:

- Trust under Public Trust Acts of various state governments
- A Society under Societies Registration Act, 1860
- Section-8 Company under Companies Act, 2013 (Formerly, Section-25 Under Companies Act, 1956)

== Trusts ==
A public charitable trust is usually floated when there is a property involved, especially in terms of land and building.

=== Legislation ===
Different states in India have different Trusts Acts in force, which govern the trusts in the state. In the absence of a Trusts Act in any particular state or territory, the general principles of the Indian Trusts Act, 1882 are applied.

=== Main Instrument ===
The main instrument of any public charitable trust is the trust deed, wherein the aims and objects and mode of management (of the trust) should be enshrined. In every trust deed, the minimum and maximum number of trustees has to be specified. The trust deed should clearly spell out the aims and objects of the trust, how the trust should be managed, how other trustees may be appointed or removed, etc. The trust deed should be signed by both the settlor/s and trustee/s in the presence of two witnesses. The trust deed should be executed on non-judicial stamp paper, the value of which would depend on the valuation of the trust property.

=== Application for Registration ===
- The application for registration should be made to the official having jurisdiction over the region in which the trust is sought to be registered.
- After providing details (in the form) regarding designation by which the public trust shall be known, names of trustees, mode of succession, etc., the applicant has to affix a court fee stamp of Rs.2/- to the form and pay a very nominal registration fee which may range from Rs.3/- to Rs.25/-, depending on the value of the trust property.
- The application form should be signed by the applicant before the regional officer or superintendent of the regional office of the charity commissioner or a notary. The application form should be submitted, together with a copy of the trust deed.
- Two other documents which should be submitted at the time of making an application for registration are affidavit and consent letter.

== Society ==
According to section 20 of the Societies Registration Act, 1860, the following societies can be registered under the Act: ‘charitable societies, military orphan funds or societies established at the several presidencies of India, societies established for the promotion of science, literature, or the fine arts, for instruction, the diffusion of useful knowledge, the diffusion of political education, the foundation or maintenance of libraries or reading rooms for general use among the members or open to the public, or public museums and galleries of paintings and other works of art, collection of natural history, mechanical and philosophical inventions, instruments or designs.’

=== Legislation ===
Societies are registered under the Societies Registration Act, 1860, which is a federal act. However, every state has its own legislation of Societies Act, which lays down the procedures for registration, management and dissolution of the society.

=== Main Instrument ===
The main instrument of a society is the memorandum of association and article of association. Memorandum of association is the charter of a society. It is a document describing the objects of its existence and its operations. The article of association includes the rules and regulations of the society. It describes the mode of management of the society.

=== Trustees ===
A Society needs a minimum of five managing committee members; there is no upper limit to the number of managing committee members. The Board of Management is in the form of a governing body or council or a managing or executive committee

=== Application for Registration ===
Registration can be done either at the state level (at the office of the Registrar of Societies) or at the district level (at the office of the District Magistrate or the local office of the Registrar of Societies).

- The procedure varies from state to state. Generally, the application should be submitted together with: (a) memorandum of association and rules and regulations; (b) consent letters of all the members of the managing committee; (c) authority letter duly signed by all the members of the managing committee; (d) an affidavit sworn by the president or secretary of the society on non-judicial stamp paper of Rs.20-/, together with a court fee stamp; (e) a declaration by the members of the managing committee that the funds of the society will be used only for the purpose of furthering the aims and objects of the society; (f) a no-objection certificate by the owner of the property which is used as postal address for communication.
- All the aforesaid documents which are required for the application for registration should be submitted in duplicate, together with the required registration fee. Unlike the trust deed, the memorandum of association and rules and regulations need not be executed on stamp paper.

== Section-8 Company ==
According to section 8(1)(a), (b) and (c) of the Indian Companies Act, 2013, a section-8 company can be established for promoting commerce, art, science, sports, education, research, social welfare, religion, charity, protection of environment or any such other object, provided the profits, if any, or other income is applied for promoting only the objectives of the company and no dividend is paid to its members.

=== Legislation ===
Section 8 of the Companies Act, 2013

=== Main Instrument ===
For a section-8 company, the main instrument is a Memorandum and articles of association (no stamp paper required)

=== Trustees ===
A section-8 Company needs a minimum of two members; there is no upper limit to the number of members. The Board of Management is in the form of a Board of directors or managing committee and should preferably be Indian nationals.

=== Application for Registration ===
1. An application has to be made for availability of name to the registrar of companies, which must be made in the prescribed form no. INC-1, together with a fee of Rs.1000/-. It is advisable to suggest a choice of five other names by which the company will be called, in case the first name which is proposed is not found acceptable by the registrar.

2. Once the availability of name is confirmed, an application should be made in writing to the regional director of the company law board. The application should be accompanied by the following documents:

- Three printed or typewritten copies of the memorandum and articles of association of the proposed company, duly signed by all the promoters with full name, address and occupation.
- A declaration by an advocate or a chartered accountant (Or practicing company secretary or cost accountant) that the memorandum and articles of association have been drawn up in conformity with the provisions of the Act and that all the requirements of the Act and the rules made thereunder have been duly complied with, in respect of registration or matters incidental or supplementary thereto.
- Three copies of a list of the names, addresses and occupations of the promoters (and where a firm is a promoter, of each partner in the firm), as well as of the members of the proposed board of directors, together with the names of companies, associations and other institutions in which such promoters, partners and members of the proposed board of directors are directors or hold responsible positions, if any, with description of the positions so held.
- A statement showing in detail the assets (with the estimated values thereof) and the liabilities of the association, as on the date of the application or within seven days of that date.
- An estimate of the future annual income and expenditure of the proposed company, specifying the sources of the income and the objects of the expenditure.
- A statement giving a brief description of the work, if any, already done by the association and of the work proposed to be done by it after registration, in pursuance of section-8 of Companies Act, 2013 (section-25 of Companies Act, 1956).
- A statement specifying briefly the grounds on which the application is made.
- A declaration by each of the persons making the application that he/she is of sound mind, not an undischarged insolvent, not convicted by a court for any offense and does not stand disqualified under section 164 of the Companies Act, 2013 (section 203 of the Companies Act 1956), for appointment as a director.

3. The applicants should also, within a week from the date of making the application to the registrar of the companies, publish a notice in the prescribed manner at least once in a newspaper in a principal language of the district in which the registered office India of the proposed company is to be situated or is situated and circulating in that district, and at least once in an English newspaper circulating in that district.

4. The registrar of companies may, after considering the objections, if any, received within 30 days from the date of publication of the notice in the newspapers, and after consulting any authority, department or ministry, as he may, in his discretion, decide, determine whether the license should or should not be granted.

5. The registrar of companies may also direct the company to insert in its memorandum, or in its articles, or in both, such conditions of the license as may be specified by him in this behalf.

== See also ==
Non-governmental organisations in India
