= UMANG =

Indian government app

UMANG Unified Mobile Application for New-age Governance
- Developer: Government of India
- Release: November 2017; 9 years ago
- Operating system: Android, iOS
- Available in: 22 Languages of India
- Type: Online service provider, DigiLocker,
- License: Freeware, proprietary
- Website: umang.gov.in

Unified Mobile Application for New-age Governance (UMANG) is a mobile app that is part of the Digital India initiative by the Ministry of Electronics and Information Technology (MeitY) of the Government of India. It provides access to services from both central and state governments. The app supports 23 Indian languages and is available for both Android and iOS platforms.

The app is aimed at all citizens of India and offers hundreds of services including payment, registration, information search and application forms. It is a component of the Digital India initiative, intending to make government services available to the general public online and around the clock.

The app was developed by the Ministry of Electronics and Information Technology with the National e-Governance Division and launched in November 2017 by Prime Minister of India Narendra Modi at the Global Conference on Cyberspace in New Delhi. At launch the app offered 162 services from 33 state and central government departments and four states.

== See also ==
- Aarogya Setu
- BharatNet
- T App Folio
- CoWIN
