= ESign (India) =

Aadhaar eSign is an online electronic signature service in India to facilitate an Aadhaar holder to digitally sign a document. The signature service is facilitated by authenticating the Aadhaar holder via the Aadhaar-based e-KYC (electronic Know Your Customer) service.

To eSign a document, one has to have an Aadhaar card and a mobile number registered with Aadhaar. With these two things, an Indian citizen can sign a document remotely without being physically present.

== Procedure ==
The notification issued by Government of India in this regard stipulates the following procedure for the e-authentication using Aadhaar e-KYC services.

Authentication of an electronic record by e-authentication technique, which shall be done by

1. the applicable use of e-authentication, hash function, and asymmetric cryptosystem techniques, leading to issuance of digital signature certificate by Certifying Authority,
2. a trusted third party service by subscriber's key pair generation, storing of the key pairs on hardware security module and creation of digital signature provided that the trusted third party shall be offered by the certifying authority (the trusted third party shall send application form and certificate signing request to the Certifying Authority for issuing a digital signature certificate to the subscriber),
3. issuance of digital signature certificate by Certifying Authority shall be based on e-authentication, particulars given in the prescribed format, digitally signed verified information from Aadhaar e-KYC services and electronic consent of digital signature certificate applicant,
4. the manner and requirements for e-authentication shall be as issued by the Controller from time to time,
5. the security procedure for creating the subscriber's key pair shall be in accordance with the e-authentication guidelines issued by the Controller,
6. the standards referred to in rule 6 of the Information Technology (Certifying Authorities) Rules, 2000 shall be complied with, in so far as they relate to the certification function of public key of Digital Signature Certificate applicant, and
7. the manner in which information is authenticated by means of digital signature shall comply with the standards specified in rule 6 of the Information Technology (Certifying Authorities) Rules, 2000 in so far as they relate to the creation, storage and transmission of Digital Signature.

== eSign Service Providers ==
Organisations and individuals seeking to obtain the eSigning Service can utilize the services of various service providers. There are empanelled service providers with whom organisations can register as an Application Service Prover after submitting the requisite documents, getting UAT access, building the application around the service and going through an IT Audit by an CERT-IN empanelled auditor.

However, the process of registering as an Application Service Provider is cumbersome, and requires huge investments of time, money and resources in complying with the regulations and building a suitable application. Most organisations prefer using services of plug-n-play gateway providers who take the responsibility of complying with the regulations, hence simplifying the process for the market.

== See also ==
- DigiLocker
