= Pradhan Mantri Awas Yojana =

Housing initiative in India

Pradhan Mantri Awas Yojana (Urban)
- Country: India
- Prime Minister(s): Narendra Modi
- Ministry: Ministry of Housing and Urban Poverty Alleviation
- Key people: Manohar Lal Khattar
- Launched: 25 June 2015; 11 years ago
- Status: Active
- Website: pmaymis.gov.in

Pradhan Mantri Awas Yojana (PMAY) is a credit-linked subsidy scheme by the Government of India to facilitate access to affordable housing for the low and moderate-income residents of the country. It envisaged a target of building 2 crore (20 million) affordable houses by 31 March 2022. It has two components: Pradhan Mantri Awas Yojana (Urban) (PMAY-U) for the urban poor and Pradhan Mantri Awaas Yojana (Gramin) (PMAY-G and also PMAY-R) for the rural poor, the former administered by Ministry of Housing and Urban Affairs and the latter by Ministry of Rural Development. This scheme converges with other schemes to ensure that houses have a toilet, Saubhagya Scheme for universal electricity connection, Ujjwala Yojana LPG connection, access to drinking water and Jan Dhan banking facilities, etc.

== History ==
Public housing programme in India started with the rehabilitation of refugees immediately after the partition. Till 1960, nearly five lakh families were provided houses in different parts of Northern India. In 1957, within the ambit of the second five-year plan of Prime Minister Nehru, Village Housing Programme (VHP) was introduced providing loans to individuals and cooperatives of up to ₹5,000 per unit. Only 67,000 houses could be constructed in this scheme till the end of the fifth Five Year Plan (1974–1979). Another scheme introduced in the fourth called House Sites-cum-Construction Assistance Scheme (HSCAS) was also transferred to the State Sector from 1974 to 1975.

With the launch of Indira Awas Yojana (IAY) by the then Prime Minister Rajiv Gandhi in 1985, the public housing programme in India got a boost. IAY was launched as a rural housing programme targeting SC/ST and the Minority population. The programme was gradually extended to cover all Below Poverty Line (BPL) population.

As a part of the continuous efforts of the Indian Government to fulfill the housing needs of rural and urban poor, Pradhan Mantri Awaas Yojana was launched by Prime Minister Narendra Modi in June 2015 with an aim to provide affordable housing.

Under PMAY, it is proposed to build 2 crore houses for the urban poor including Economically Weaker Sections and Low-Income Groups in urban areas by the year 2022 through the financial assistance of ₹2 lakh crore (US$21 billion) from the central government. Under the Pradhan Mantri Awas Yojana, a subsidy of ₹2.67 lakh is provided by the government on the interest of home loan for buying a house. The Uttar Pradesh Housing Development Council will provide houses at affordable rates under the Pradhan Mantri Awas Yojana. Applications have been sought under this scheme for about 3,516 houses in Uttar Pradesh. The booking starts from 1 September 2020 and the last date of booking is 15 October 2020. These houses are located in 19 cities in the state of Uttar Pradesh. People from poor families will be able to buy these houses for only ₹3.5 lakh. All those people whose annual income is less than ₹3 lakh are eligible to apply for these houses. The Uttar Pradesh Housing Development Council had earlier kept the repayment time of the house up to 5 years, which has been changed to 3 years.

Indira Awas Yojana or IAY is one of the first centralised housing schemes for Indians. It was introduced by the then Prime Minister, Rajiv Gandhi, in 1985. The scheme's primary objective was to provide housing for the economically weaker sections in the country, and individuals belonging to below the poverty line or BPL. At first, its benefits were exclusive to beneficiaries from the Scheduled Caste and Scheduled Tribe minority groups. However, as of 2016, IAY was officially merged with the Pradhan Mantri Awas Yojana Gramin scheme.

== The scheme ==
The features of Pradhan Mantri Awas Yojana are that the government will provide an interest subsidy of 6.5% (for EWS and LIG), 4% for MIG-I and 3% for MIG-II on housing loans availed by the beneficiaries for a period of 20 years under credit link subsidy scheme (CLSS) from the start of a loan. The houses under Pradhan Mantri Awas Yojana would be constructed through an eco-friendly technology while allotting ground floors in any housing scheme under PMAY, preference will be given to disabled and older persons.

=== Finance ===
The government has approved an investment of ₹43,922 crore (US$4.6 billion) for construction of 6,83,724 houses for urban poor including central assistance commitment of ₹10,050 crore (US$1.0 billion) by April 2016.

=== Eligibility criteria ===
Condition for PMAY:

(a) Beneficiary max age 70 years.

(b) EWS (Economic Weaker Section) family income limit is ₹3 lakhs per annum and for LIG (Lower Income Group) Family Income limit is ₹6 Lakhs per annum, and Middle Income Group -(MIG-I) income between ₹6 lakhs to ₹12 lakhs per annum, (MIG-II) income between ₹12 lakhs to ₹18 lakhs per annum.

c) The beneficiary should not have an own dwelling unit in the name of any family member in any part of India.

d) The loan applicant should not have availed any central/state government subsidy or benefit for buying a home under the PMAY scheme.

e) Currently, the loan applicant should not own any property under their name and along with any of the family members (including the dependents).

f) The home renovation or improvement loans, self-construction loans will be allocated only for EWS and LIG categories.

The houses given under this scheme will be owned by females or jointly with males.

=== Phases ===
3 Phases of PMAY envisage starting and completing the house construction work as follows:

- PMAY Phase-1 from April 2015 to March 2017 to cover 100 cities.
- PMAY Phase-2 from April 2017 to March 2019 to cover an additional 200 cities.
- PMAY Phase-3 from April 2019 to March 2021 to cover the remaining cities.

=== States and cities covered ===
As of 25 April 2016, the government has identified 2,508 cities and towns in 26 states for beginning construction of houses for urban poor. Construction of 1,86,777 additional houses for the benefit of urban poor with an investment of ₹11,169 cr with central assistance of ₹2,797 cr was approved in February 2018, taking the cumulative total houses approved to 39,25,240 houses including subsumed RAY scheme, of the targeted 1 crore houses by March 2022.

1. Chhattisgarh – 1,000 cities/towns
2. Jammu and Kashmir – 19 cities/towns
3. Jharkhand – 15 cities/towns
4. Madhya Pradesh – 74 cities/towns
5. Rajasthan
6. Haryana, 53,290 houses in 38 cities and towns with an investment of ₹4,322 crore (c. Feb 2018)
7. Tamil Nadu, 40,623 houses in 65 cities and towns with an investment of ₹2,314 crore (c. Feb 2018)
8. Karnataka, 32,656 houses in 95 cities with an investment of ₹1,461 crore (c. Feb 2018)
9. Gujarat, 15,584 houses in 45 cities and towns with an investment of ₹946 crore (c. Feb 2018)
10. Maharashtra, 12,123 houses in 13 cities and towns with an investment of ₹868 crore (c. Feb 2018)
11. Kerala, 9,461 houses in 52 cities with an investment of ₹284 crore (c. Feb 2018)
12. Uttarakhand, 6,226 houses in 57 cities and towns with an investment of ₹258 crore (c. Feb 2018)
13. Orissa, 5,133 houses in 26 cities and towns with an investment of ₹156 crore (c. Feb 2018)
14. West Bengal 7,682 houses in 17 cities and towns with an investment of ₹318 crore (c. Feb 2018)

=== Private contributors ===
ICICI Bank is giving subsidised home loans to the people eligible for this scheme.

"Rajiv Awas Yojana (RAY)" was an Indian government program that attempts to help slum dwellers gain appropriate housing and address the processes by which slums are created and reproduced. It was introduced by the Indian government's Ministry of Housing and urban poverty Alleviation. The programme was a Centrally Sponsored Scheme, which ran from 2013 to 2014. The scheme aimed to make India slum-free by 2022 by providing people with shelter or housing, free of cost. It began with a pilot project, before launching in mission mode. The government earmarked ₹32,230 crore (US$3.3 billion) for its implementation during India's 12th Five Year Plan. One million beneficiaries were proposed to be covered under Rajiv Awas Yojana.

Site selection was to be made by the states in consultation with the Centre giving priority to district headquarters, cities of religious heritage and tourist importance, with due consideration to the criterion of the pace of growth of the city, of slums within the city and predominance of Scheduled Caste, Scheduled Tribe and minority population and other weaker and vulnerable section of the society. SBI has now slashed down the interest rate of home loans above ₹75 lakh by 10 basis points. From 15 June 2017, the rate for the same will be 8.55-8.6%.

== See also ==
- DigiLocker (easier access to online identity proof and services)
- Jal Jeevan Mission (water connection for each house)
- One Nation, One Ration Card (food security card's national portability)
- Saubhagya electrification scheme (electrification of all houses)
- Swachh Bharat Mission (toilet for all houses)
- Ujjwala Yojana (clean cooking gas connections for all)
