= Saubhagya scheme =

Indian government project

Saubhagya Scheme or Pradhan Mantri Sahaj Bijli Har Ghar Yojana was an Indian government project to provide electricity to poor and disadvantaged households. The project was announced in September 2017 by Prime Minister Narendra Modi, who said that the aim was to complete the electrification process by December 2018. Certain households identified via the Socio-economic and Caste Census (SECC) of 2011 will be eligible for free electricity connections, while others will be charged Rs. 500. On 16 November 2017, the government launched a website saubhagya.gov.in to disseminate information about the scheme. The total outlay of the project is Rs. 16, 320 crore while the Gross Budgetary Support (GBS) is Rs. 12,320 crore. The beneficiary household will get One LED lights, one DC power plug. It also includes the Repair and Maintenance of Meter Only (R&M) for 5 years. The scheme was closed in March 2022 since the target of 100% electrification was met.

== Responses ==
91% of rural Indian households have received electricity access by June 2019. Commentators have noted that while the scheme would provide the capacity for electricity in poor and rural households, it did not solve the problem of power outages and made no provision for cases where households could not afford electricity bills. In October 2018, Bihar completed its target of 100 per cent electrification of willing households under Saubhagya scheme. As it completed 4 years of implementation, 2.82 crore households have been given electricity access as of March 2021.

In 2022, the Jammu and Kashmir administration was awarded by the Government of India for providing electricity ahead of the deadline to all the villages under the Saubhagya scheme. But for Kamach, a remote hamlet in Chatroo tehsil of Kishtwar district electricity continues to remain a distant dream.

== See also ==
- Rajiv Gandhi Grameen Vidyutikaran Yojana, the rural electrification scheme implemented by the Singh Government
- Common man empowerment:
  - DigiLocker (easier access to online identity proof and services)
  - Har ghar jal (water connection for each house)
  - One Nation, One Ration Card (food security card's national portability)
  - Pradhan Mantri Awas Yojana (affordable housing for all)
  - Swachh Bharat (toilet for all houses)
  - Ujjwala Yojana (clean cooking gas connections for all)
  - Mohid Ahmad design logo of Saubhagya scheme.
