= Government e Marketplace =

Indian government internet platform

Government e Marketplace (GeM)
- Country: India
- Ministry: Ministry of Commerce and Industry, Government of India
- Key people: Mihir Kumar, CEO
- Launched: 9 August 2016; 10 years ago New Delhi, India
- Website: gem.gov.in

Government e Marketplace (GeM) is an online platform for public procurement in India. The initiative was launched on 9 August 2016, by the Ministry of Commerce and Industry in the Government of India, with the objective to create an open and transparent procurement platform for government buyers. It was built in a record time of 5 months to facilitate the online procurement of goods and Services. Use of GeM by Government users has been authorized and made mandatory by the Ministry of Finance by adding a new Rule No. 149 in the General Financial Rules, 2017.

The platform is owned by GeM SPV, a Special Purpose Vehicle which is a 100 percent Government-owned, non-profit company under the Ministry of Commerce and Industries, Government of India.

GeM is a contactless, paperless and cashless online marketplace which replaced a variety of manual processes undertaken within a fragmented policy context, formerly overseen by the Directorate General of Supplies and Disposals (DGS&D) in 2016. Since its inception, GeM has brought in the visibility and transparency in public procurement. The portal has transformed public procurement in India by driving its three pillars, namely openness, fairness and inclusiveness, and aims to achieve greater usability, transparency, efficiency and cost savings.

According to an independent assessment made by the World Bank, average savings for buyers in Government e Marketplace portal is about 9.75% on the median price. The Government of India has made it mandatory for sellers to display the 'country of origin' on products to be sold on GeM portal.

== History ==
Government e Marketplace was launched in August 2016 to enable central and state governments and CPSEs for online procurement of goods and services. The initial version of GeM portal was developed and hosted by the erstwhile Directorate General of Supplies and Disposals (DGS&D) under the Ministry of Commerce and Industry with technical support of National E-Governance Division (NeGD), Ministry of Electronics and Information Technology. The National Mission on GeM (NMG) was launched on 5 September 2018, by Suresh Prabhu, the Commerce and Industry Minister, to accelerate the adoption and use of GeM by major central ministries, states, UTs and their agencies, including CPSUs, PSUs, local bodies.

Currently, a Managed Service Provider (MSP) is responsible for enhancing and maintaining the GeM portal. For payment services, GeM has linked with numerous banks and the IT systems of significant buyers.

As of 2026, the chief executive officer of Government e-Marketplace is Mihir Kumar, an officer of the 1996 batch of the Indian Defence Accounts Service (IDAS), who assumed charge in April 2025.

== Objectives ==
GeM identifies efficiency, transparency and inclusiveness as its three principles for government procurement. It is inclusive since it allows anyone and everyone to do business on GeM, Efficient for conducting business operations smoothly, and Transparent for fair business practices. In addition, the platform seeks to improve openness, effectiveness, and speed in public procurement. It offers a wide range of procurement methods, including direct purchase, electronic bidding, electronic reverse auction, and direct reverse auction. The digital platform enables economies of scale, efficient price discovery, and dissemination of best practices. According to Rule 149 of the General Financial Rules 2017, the procurement of goods and services by ministries, government agencies, and Public Sector Enterprises is now mandated to be done through the GeM portal. State Governments are also encouraged to purchase through GeM.

== Initiatives ==
- In December 2019, GeM launched a two-month-long national outreach program called GeM Samvaad to facilitate the onboarding of sellers while catering to specific requirements and procurement needs of buyers.
- The Union Minister of State for Agriculture and Farmers' Welfare, Parshottam Rupala, launched the dedicated web page for bamboo products and quality planting materials on the GeM portal in June 2021. The page is referred to as 'The Green Gold Collection'.
- In order to help the proprietors, meet with large-scale orders, GeM launched a Google Playstore App GeM SAHAY in June 2021 that helps the proprietors in getting loans against their purchase orders.
- On the occasion of World Environment Day 2021, a new product category of 'Green Room Air Conditioners' was launched on GeM portal.
- GeM launched a dedicated page for COVID-19 products in June 2021, which helped in meeting with emergency requirements of oxygen cylinders, concentrators, kits etc.
- GeM as a mark of inclusivity, its third pillar, opened the portal for onboarding specially abled sellers under its initiative 'Divyangjan entrepreneurs' in June 2021.
- The Unified Procurement System for goods and services was launched in October 2020 with the integration of the Central Public Procurement Portal (CPPP) with GeM and the functionalities of the "GeM Availability Report and Past Transaction Summary" and "custom bids".
- GeM Start-up Runway was launched to facilitate startups in selling innovative products and services to government users in April 2019.
- In February 2019, GeM started an initiative called SWAYATT to promote Startups, Women and Youth Advantage through eTransactions on the Government e Marketplace portal. It was launched by Suresh Prabhu, the Union Minister of Commerce & Industry and Civil Aviation.
- On 14 January 2019, the Union Government launched an initiative called 'Womaniya on Government e Marketplace' that enables women entrepreneurs and Women Self-Help Groups to sell handicrafts, handloom, and accessories directly to Government departments.
- New functionality was adopted during 2021 allowing automatic receipt generation and calculating penalty interest on delayed payments.

== Financials and statistics ==
By May 2025, GeM had facilitated more than 2.86 crore (28.6 million) orders, with a gross merchandise value (GMV) exceeding ₹13.6 lakh crore and a median price saving of 9.75%.

As of August 2026, GeM had facilitated procurement worth more than ₹20 lakh crore since its launch in 2016. It recorded a GMV of ₹1.47 lakh crore during the first four months of the 2026–27 financial year. Micro and small enterprises accounted for 45.6% of cumulative GMV, with orders worth more than ₹9.07 lakh crore. The platform had 12.25 lakh registered MSEs and 25.45 lakh registered sellers. The portal has over 1.64 lakh buyer organisations and offers more than 10,900 product categories and 330 service categories.

== Awards and recognition ==
- GeM won the Gold Award for "Best Use of AI/ML, Data Analytics and Emerging Technologies in Public Services" at the prestigious ET Government DigiTechAwards 2025.
- GeM was recognised as Procurement Organisation of the Year, for "Excellence in Procurement Transformation" and "Excellence in Public Procurement" by the Institute for Supply Management – India at the 8th Annual ISM –India Conference and CPO Awards 2023.
- The Chartered Institute of Procurement & Supply (CIPS) has awarded GeM as the winner under the 'Best use of digital technology' category at its Excellence in Procurement awards, 2021.
- Winner of the Dun & Bradstreet India's Top PSUs Awards, 2021 in the category of "E-Governance Solutions for Public Procurement".
- The company won The Hindu Business Line Changemaker Award for Digital Transformation in March 2020.
- The platform was also nominated for the United Nations' ITU WSIS Prize.
- In 2018, it was honoured with Digital India Platinum Award for 'Exemplary Online Service' by the Ministry of Electronics and Information Technology (MeitY).
- Government e Marketplace was awarded the South Asia Procurement Innovation Award by the World Bank in 2016.

== See also ==
- Atmanirbhar Bharat
- Digital India
