= DigiLocker =

Indian secure cloud-based digital document wallet

- Developers: Ministry of Electronics and Information Technology, Government of India
- Release: December 2015; 10 years ago

Stable release(s)
- Android: 9.0.3 / 29 April 2025; 18 months ago
- iOS: 4.0.4 / 22 May 2025; 18 months ago
- Operating system: Android 10 or above; iOS 13.4 or above; Web browsers
- Platform: Google Play; App Store
- Size: 53 MB (Android); 102.8 MB (iOS)
- Type: Digitization
- License: Freeware
- Website: digilocker.gov.in

DigiLocker is an Indian state-owned cloud digitization service provided by the Ministry of Electronics and Information Technology (MEITy) of the Government of India under its Digital India initiative. DigiLocker allows access to certified digital versions of a wide variety of government-issued and privately-issued documents, including driver's licenses, vehicle registration and insurance documents, birth and death certificates, and academic transcripts. It also provides 1 GB storage space to each account to upload scanned copies of legacy documents.

Users need to possess an Aadhaar number, a unique identifier proving one's identity, to use DigiLocker. During registration, user identity is verified using a one-time password (OTP) sent to the linked mobile number.

The beta version of the service was rolled out in February 2015, and was launched to the public on 1 July 2015. Storage space for uploaded legacy documents was initially 100 MB. Individual files are limited to 10 MB.

In July 2016, DigiLocker recorded 2.013 million users with a repository of 2.413 million documents. The number of users saw a large jump of 753,000 new users in April when the central government urged municipal bodies to use DigiLocker to make their administration paperless.

From 2017, the facility was extended to allow students of the CISCE exam board to store their grades 11 and 12 academic certificates in DigiLocker and share them as required. In February 2017, Kotak Mahindra Bank started providing access to documents in DigiLocker from within its net-banking application, allowing users to electronically sign and share them. In May 2017, over 108 hospitals, including the Tata Memorial Hospital were planning to launch the use of DigiLocker for storing cancer patients' medical documents and test reports. According to a UIDAI architect, patients would be provided a number key, which they could share with other hospitals to grant them access to their test reports.

As of December 2019, DigiLocker provides access to over 372 crore (3.72 billion) authentic documents from 149 issuers. Over 3.3 crore users are registered on the platform, and 43 requester organisations accept documents from DigiLocker. In 2023, the Government of India integrated the Passport Application Form with DigiLocker. As of December 2024, the DigiLocker platform facilitated 9.4 billion document issuances to 43.49 crore (approximately 434.9 million) users.

There is also an associated facility for e-signing documents. The service is intended to minimise the use of physical documents and reduce administrative expense, while proving the authenticity of the documents, providing secure access to government-issued documents.

== Structure of DigiLocker ==
Each user's digital locker has the following sections.

- My Certificates: This section has two subsections:
  - Digital Documents: This contains the URIs of the documents issued to the user by government departments or other agencies.
  - Uploaded Documents: This subsection lists all the documents which are uploaded by the user. Each file to be uploaded should not be more than 10MB in size. Only pdf, jpg, jpeg, png, bmp and gif file types can be uploaded.
- My Profile: This section displays the complete profile of the user as available in the UIDAI database.
- My Issuer: This section displays the issuers' names and the number of documents issued to the user by the issuer.
- My Requester: This section displays the requesters' names and the number of documents requested from the user by the requesters.
- Directories: This section displays the complete list of registered issuers and requesters along with their URLs.

== Amendments to IT Act for Digital Locker ==
DigiLocker is not merely a technical platform. The Ministry of Electronics and IT has notified rules concerning the service. Amendments made to the Information Technology Act, 2000 in February 2017 state that the documents provided and shared through DigiLocker are at par with the corresponding physical certificates.

Per this Rule, the following apply:

(1) Issuers may start issuing and Requesters may start accepting digitally (or electronically) signed certificates or documents shared from subscribers’ Digital Locker accounts at par with the physical documents in accordance with the provisions of the Act and rules made thereunder.

(2) When such certificate or document mentioned in sub-rule (1) has been issued or pushed in the Digital Locker System by an issuer and subsequently accessed or accepted by a requester through the URI, it shall be deemed to have been shared by the issuer directly in electronic form.

== Security measures of DigiLocker ==
The following are the security measures used in the system:

- 256 Bit SSL Encryption
- Mobile Authentication based Sign Up
- ISO 27001 certified Data Centre
- Data Redundancy
- Timed Log Out
- Security Audit

== See also ==
- India Stack
  - Aadhaar
  - Direct Benefit Transfer
  - eSign (India)
  - UMANG
  - Unified Payments Interface
  - National Informatics Centre
- Common man empowerment:
  - Har ghar jal (water connection for each house)
  - One Nation, One Ration Card (food security card)
  - Pradhan Mantri Awas Yojana (affordable housing for all)
  - Saubhagya electrification scheme (electrification of all houses)
  - Swachh Bharat (toilet for all houses)
  - Ujjwala Yojana (clean cooking gas connections for all)
  - Unified University and College Management System
