= National Health Authority =

Organization in India

Agency overview
- Formed: 2 January 2019; 7 years ago
- Preceding Agency: National Health Agency
- Jurisdiction: Government of India
- Headquarters: New Delhi
- Agency executive: Sunil Kumar Barnwal, CEO
- Parent Agency: Ministry of Health and Family Welfare
- Website: nha.gov.in

The National Health Authority (NHA) is responsible for implementing India’s flagship public health insurance/assurance scheme Ayushman Bharat Pradhan Mantri Jan Arogya Yojana (AB PM-JAY). NHA has been set-up to implement the PM-JAY at the national level. In the States, SHAs or State Health Agencies in the form of a society/trust have been set up with full operational autonomy over the implementation of this scheme including extending the coverage to non SECC beneficiaries.

== History ==
National Health Authority is the successor of National Health Agency, which was functioning as a registered society since 23 May 2018. Pursuant to Cabinet decision for full functional autonomy, National Health Agency was reconstituted as the National Health Authority on 2 January 2019, under Gazette Notification Registered No. DL –(N) 04/0007/2003-18. On 2 January 2019 the organization renamed itself to become the "National Health Authority". The reason for the rename was the Union Council of Ministers wish for the organization to be autonomous.

== Governing Board ==
The NHA is governed by a Governing Board chaired by the Union Minister for Health and Family Welfare, Government of India; and is headed by a full-time Chief Executive Officer (CEO) supported by Deputy CEO and Executive Directors. The CEO of the NHA functions as the Member Secretary of the Governing Board.

The Governing Board comprises Chairperson and 11 members.

== List of Chairperson ==
Chairperson
Name	Tenure Began	Tenure end
Indu Bhushan	2018	2021
Ram Sewak Sharma	2021	2023
Dipti Gaur Mukharjee	2023	2024
LS Changsan	2024	2025
V Hekali Zhimomi	2025	2025
Sunil Kumar Barnwal	2025	Incumbent

== Functions of NHA ==
From 2018-19, the organization was under the control of the Ministry of Health and Family Welfare. After 2019, the organization became independent and answerable to its own board of experts and policy makers. The organization's primary activity is to manage the Pradhan Mantri Jan Arogya Yojana (PM-JAY), which is a national health insurance program in India. Other goals include improving access to health information and data for the public sector and supporting the Insurance Regulatory and Development Authority. NHA also oversees the development and adoption of ABHA (Ayushman Bharat Health Account), previously called Health ID. This program aims to establish a digital health identity for Indian citizens.

In October 2019, the organization announced a collaboration with Google. In the collaboration, Google will provide digital training to staff and partners, while the organization will seek to increase public access to data.
