= Health care access among Dalits in India =

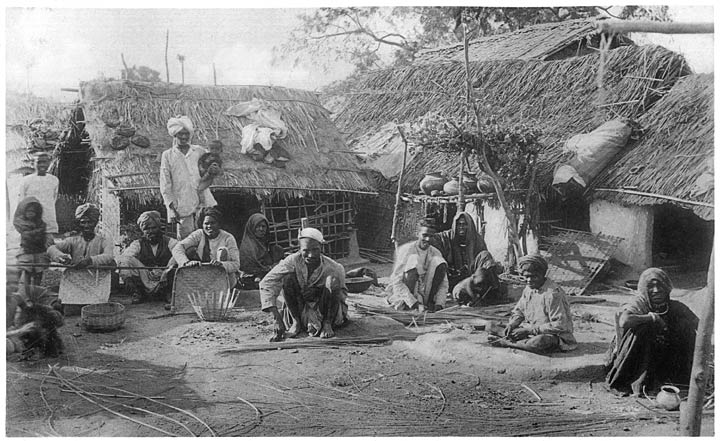
Dalit Community in India

Achieving Universal Health Care has been a key goal of the Indian Government since the Constitution was drafted. The Government has since launched several programs and policies to realize 'Health for All' in the nation. These measures are in line with the sustainable development goals set by the United Nations. Health disparities generated through the Hindu caste system have been a major roadblock in realizing these goals. The Dalit (untouchables) community occupies the lowest stratum of the Hindu caste system. Historically, they have performed menial jobs like - manual scavenging, skinning animal hide, and sanitation. The Indian constitution officially recognizes the Dalit community as 'Scheduled Castes' and bans caste-based discrimination of any form. However, caste and its far-reaching effects are still prominent in several domains including healthcare. Dalits (Scheduled Caste or SC) and Adivasis (Scheduled Tribes or ST) have the lowest healthcare utilization and outcome percentage. Their living conditions and occupations put them at high risk for disease exposure. This, clubbed with discrimination from healthcare workers and lack of awareness makes them the most disadvantaged groups in society.

== Healthcare Utilisation ==
Lack of basic amenities and sanitation in Indian villages

Historically, Dalits lived on the outskirts of civilization, worked as bonded labourers, and lacked access to basic amenities. They were denied access to water, land, and education. They had limited access to doctors and healers. According to research, socioeconomic discrimination affects health outcomes in three ways- 1) health status, 2) quality of healthcare services, and 3) healthcare access. The inequalities in health created by the caste system are prominent even today.

Most of the Dalit population resides in rural areas and face challenges in travelling to healthcare centres. In urban areas, Dalit families can be found in urban slums. Most do not avail healthcare subsidies due to a lack of identification documents. Surveys reveal that there is mutual distrust between Dalit communities and healthcare workers. This is a form of institutionalized discrimination. Auxiliary-trained midwives (ANMs) and nurses are less likely to visit Dalit households, often citing sanitation concerns or social norms. Dalits often complain that they receive differential treatment from workers at regional health subcenters. As a result, they prefer to rely on unqualified healers and doctors and end up paying a lot. Increased privatization of the healthcare system has only worsened the problem due to price hikes.

According to data from the National Family Health Survey, life expectancy at birth for the general caste is 68.0 years. The life expectancy of SC and ST is significantly lower at 63.0 and 64.0 years respectively- with the life expectancy of men lower than that of women; this is likely due to the uncertain and unsafe conditions they are exposed to. Dalits are at a higher risk of contracting HIV-AIDS. Most Dalits suffer from skin problems, respiratory disease, parasitic illnesses, and diminishing vision and eyesight. The India Inequality Report of 2021 reports that SC and ST communities have the highest fertility rates yet the infant mortality rate and under-5 mortality rate in these communities are higher than the national average. The percentage of stunted children in SC and ST households is 12.6 and 13.6% higher than that in general castes. A majority of these children are also anaemic. Dalit children also face discrimination through the Midday Meal Scheme, defeating its purpose. Nonetheless, there have been some encouraging results from government programs. Due to an increased push from the government for childhood vaccinations and appropriate antenatal care in mothers, there is an increasing trend in vaccine utilization during infancy and pregnancy, however, the degree of adherence is still low and most individuals do not complete their vaccination schedule. The gap between institutional births between SC & ST and the general category is also decreasing. SC & ST households receive higher food supplements than the national average, indicating improvements in government food programs.

Healthcare indicators have been improving in urban, high-income families; most SC - ST communities are rural and low-income. Although household medical expenditures have improved over the years, an average general category household spent 1.7 times higher than Dalits in 2017-18. Huge out-of-pocket expenses on medication and tests discourage these communities from seeking healthcare. Dalit practitioners in the healthcare workforce are rare, despite measures for affirmative action. All these factors, skew the healthcare experience received by different social groups.

=== Dalit women ===
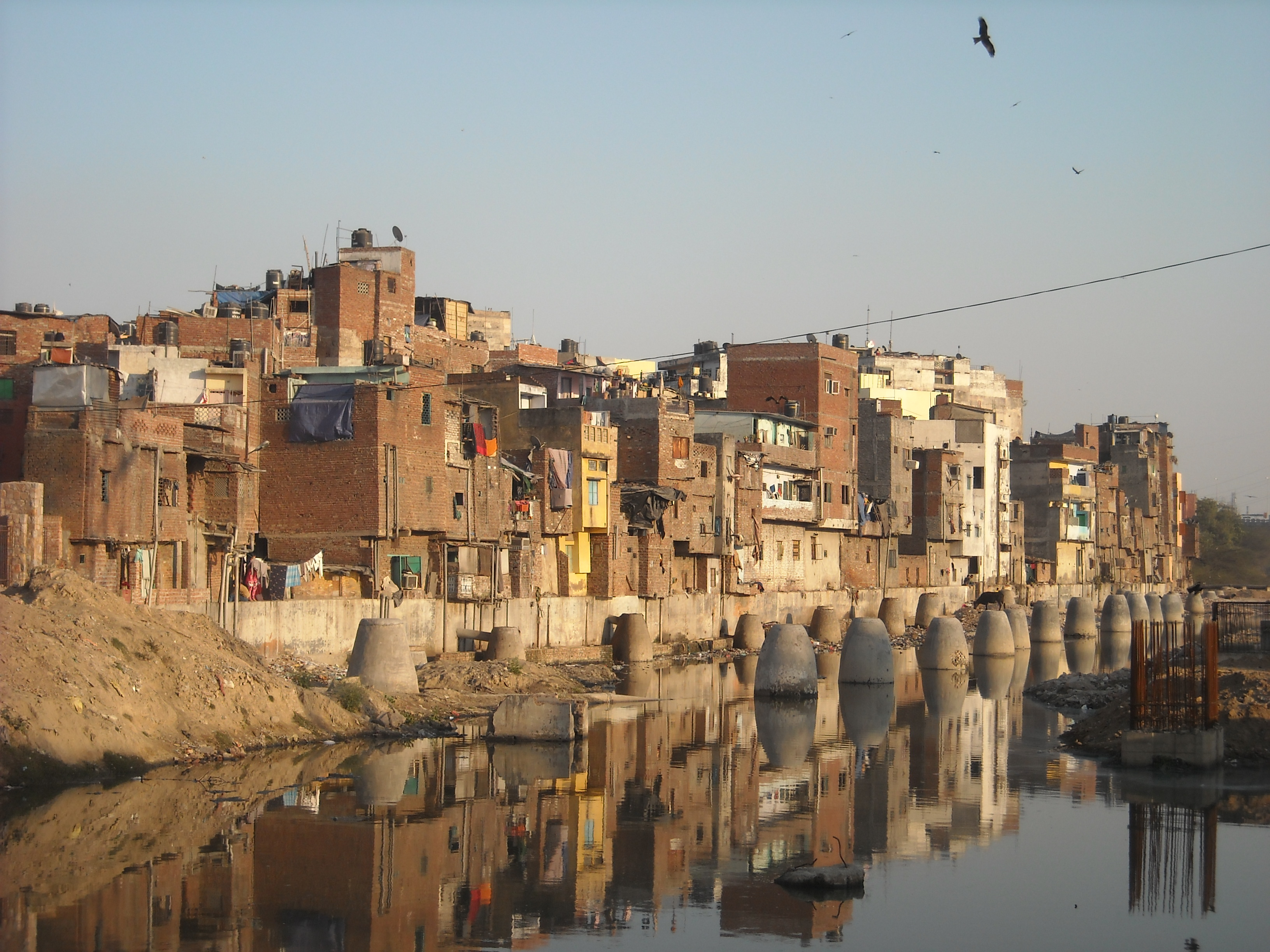
An urban slum in Delhi, India

Dalit women face the double burden of being lower caste and female. This can be attributed to the lack of safety, sanitation, and exposure to diseases as an occupational hazard. In rural areas, Dalit women perform household chores as well as work as bonded labours with little to no pay. In urban areas, they usually work in households as maids. These women lack any form of social security in society. Most women are married by the age of 20 and are responsible for the care of multiple children. In most households, the men are the primary decision-makers. Studies reveal that healthcare utilisation is higher in households where the woman has the freedom to make decisions of her own. Surveys reveal that Dalit women have to travel long distances on foot to reach the regional healthcare subcentres- which may or may not be functional. Even though the government provides antenatal care medications like- anti-parasitic tablets, folic acid tablets, tetanus shots, and education for pregnancy- very few women can avail these.

According to a study on healthcare-seeking behaviour and healthcare spending by young mothers in India, women from lower castes spent less on public sector practitioners than higher caste women. Additionally, lower caste women also spent less on private practitioners and self-medication than higher caste women and non-Hindu women, yet experienced more self-reported morbidities than women from higher castes. Only 23.7% of Dali households have access to toilets. Girls and women usually travel long distances for sanitation purposes, which poses a serious challenge to reproductive and menstrual health. Another study on the utilisation of antenatal care among women in southern India found that lower-caste women were less likely to have received maternal healthcare than women from higher castes. In the state of Andhra Pradesh, scheduled castes and scheduled tribes were 30 per cent less likely to have received antenatal care than women from higher castes- even when potentially confounding factors, such as age, birth order, and education level, were held constant. Also, while controlling for other factors, women belonging to scheduled castes or scheduled tribes in the state of Karnataka were about 40% less likely to have had antenatal care during the first trimester of pregnancy than women from higher castes. The study also found that women belonging to scheduled casts or scheduled tribes were less likely to give birth at hospitals and to be assisted by a health professional during delivery than women from higher castes. The country witnessed a 45 per cent rise in reported cases of rape in Dalit women between 2015 and 2020. Dalit women are frequently exposed to domestic violence, physical assaults as punishment for being lower castes, human trafficking, and prostitution. Dalit women's literacy has improved their social status, however, the situation remains glum.

== The COVID-19 Effect ==
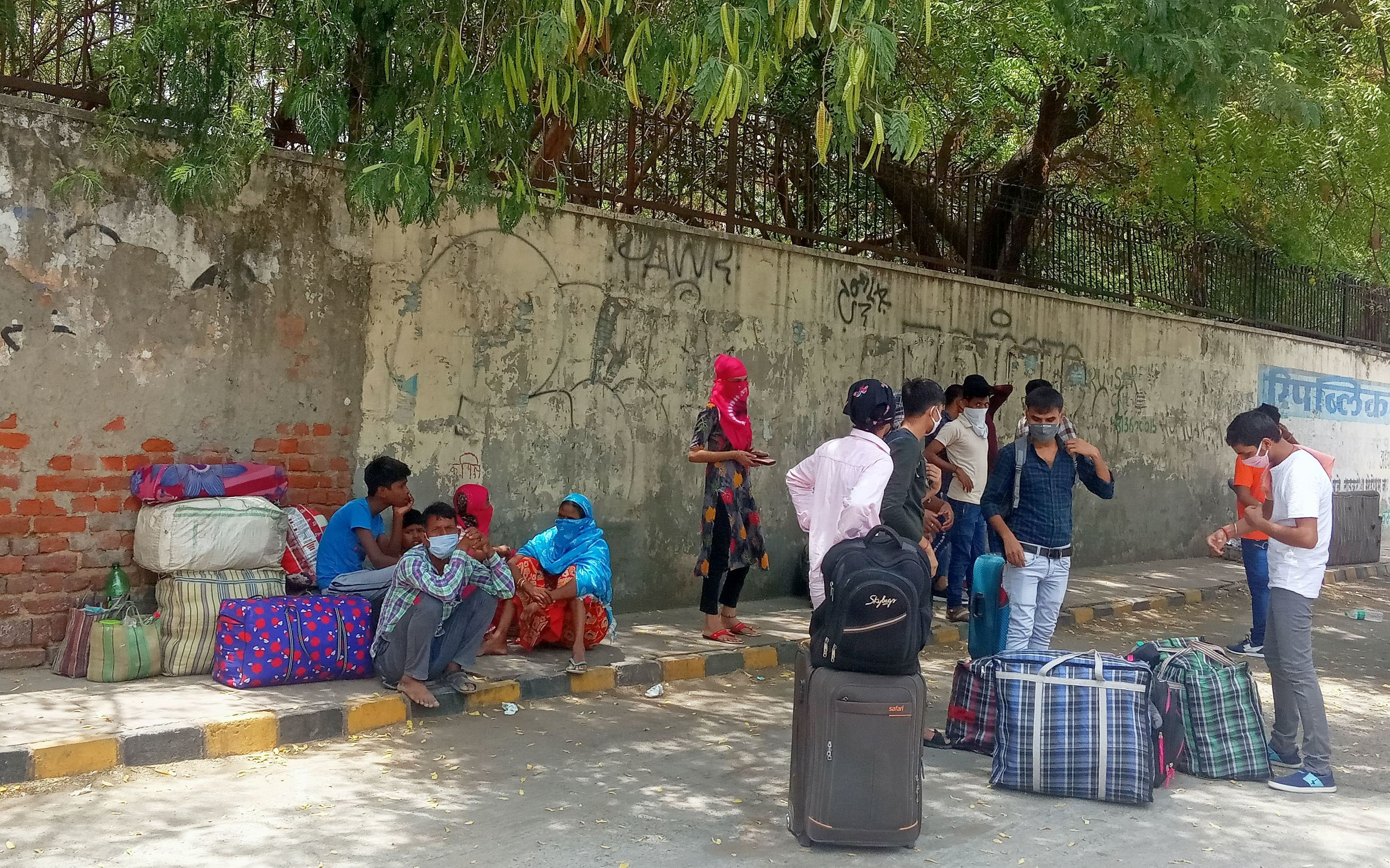
Stranded migrant workers during the lockdown

The COVID-19 pandemic sheds more light on the healthcare disparities in India. The impact of the complete lockdown in India was felt the most by the poorest of the poor who worked as daily wage workers and labour. While the government issued guidelines on home quarantine, the fact that most Dalit households do not have basic amenities like a toilet and food supplies was overlooked. Approximately 11,000 migrant labourers were stranded away from home due to the lockdown and 96 per cent did not receive any government-sponsored ration during this period. Several migrant workers chose to walk on foot across state borders and were met with severe hostility. This period also saw a spike in hate crimes against Dalits. The guidelines on 'social distancing' reinforced the means of caste-based discrimination. For instance, the Yanadi (SC) community of Vijaywada, Andhra Pradesh was barred from travelling to local markets for buying food and medicine since the lockdown. The municipal corporation is responsible for providing safety equipment like clean clothes, soap, headgear, gloves, rubber boots etc. to manual scavengers. The Ministry of Family Health and Welfare recommended that sanitation workers receive personal protective equipment like N-95 masks, sanitisers, rubber gloves and boots during the pandemic as they dealt with biological waste. This recommendation was barely acted on by the Municipal Corporations. Thus, Dalits were at a higher risk of being exposed to COVID and received little government support during the lockdown.

During the pandemic, the SC-ST groups faced greater difficulty in securing healthcare. 21% of villages did not allow SC families access to public health centres during the pandemic. Most lacked the connections to arrange for transportation, oxygen tanks, or beds in private hospitals. Reports also suggest that these communities faced serious travel accessing non-COVID-related care during this period. During the vaccination drive, high-income, urban dwellers were able to secure vaccine appointments through private hospitals at a higher cost. Poor marginalized communities queued up outside government centres for receiving their vaccination. Vaccine distribution between hospitals was also unequal. In a country with a huge digital literacy gap, schemes to digitize vaccinations only made COVID- care more inaccessible to Dalit families.

== Current programs and policies ==
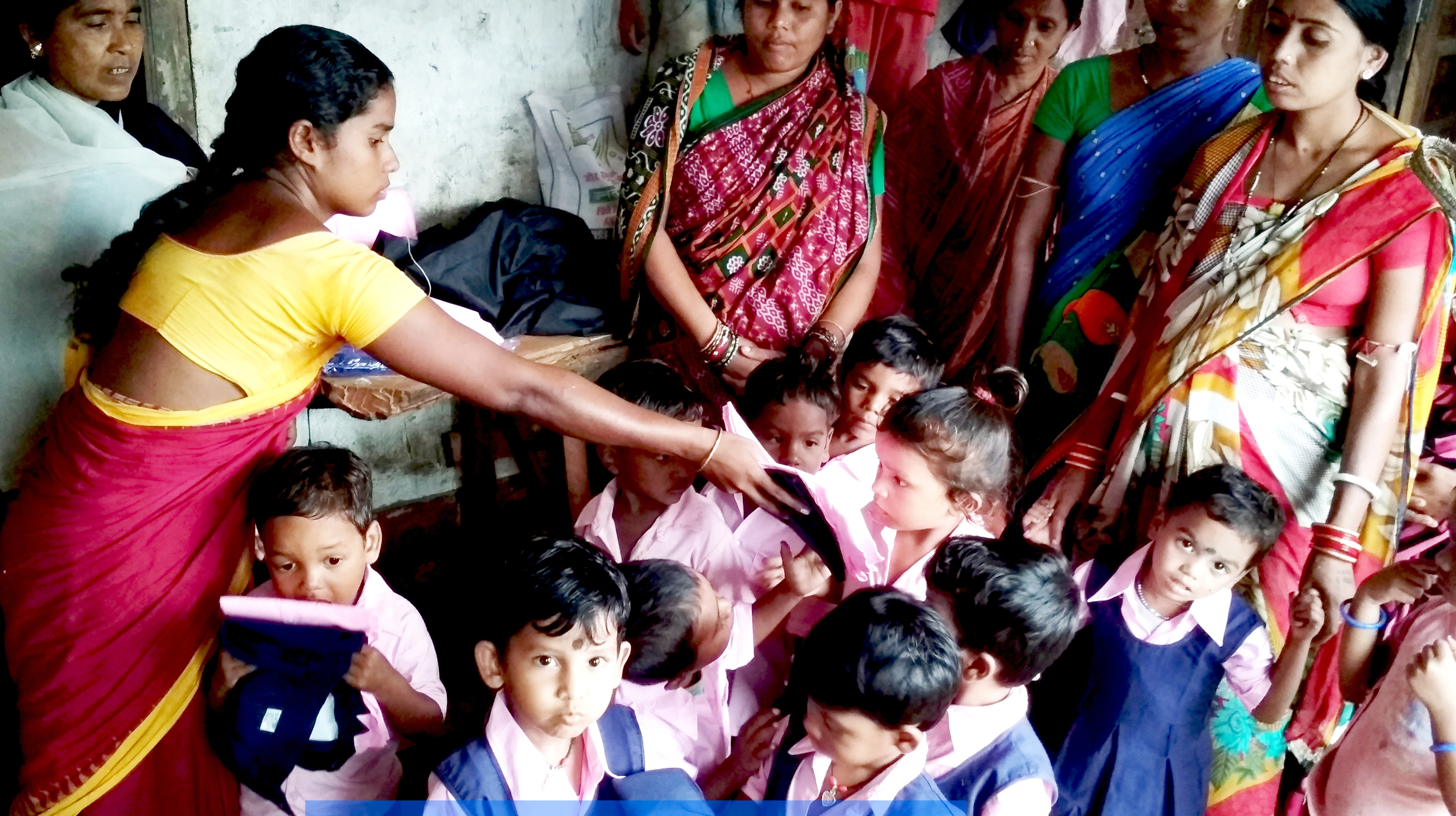
Anganwadi programs for rural children

Led by B.R. Ambedkar, the Dalit Movement gained momentum in 1956. He was also one of the authors of the Indian Constitution which provides guidelines to ensure equality and prevent discrimination in society. Article 17 laid out stipulations for abolishing 'untouchability' of any kind. To create a level playing field, the Constitution laid out guidelines for reservation and affirmative action for members of lower caste communities in employment, education, and political representation. The Prevention of Atrocities Act of 1989, recognized the discrimination and threat to lower caste individuals. Despite these efforts, Dalits receive little benefit that the State promised them- Dalits are still subject to hate crimes, affirmative action provisions have failed to reduce grassroots-level issues in primary education, Dalit students have a high dropout ratio and employees are less trained, and discrimination against Dalits is evident across the health sector.

The Dalit sub-plan adopted during the fifth and sixth Five Year Plan of India, laid out stipulations for all 23 ministries to allocate 2-32 per cent of their budget to Dalit development. This resulted in a significant boost in Dalit welfare program funding in comparison to the previous plans. Recently, the government discontinued the five-year plans, resulting in concerns about the allocation of funds to Dalit welfare.

=== Health centres and schemes ===
The National Health Policy of 1983 focused on primary healthcare and aimed to reduce infant mortality rates, maternal mortality, and the occurrence of anaemia in girls among other things. According to the World Health Organization, the creation of a robust primary healthcare system will reduce healthcare disparities. In recent years, a push towards private investment in healthcare has resulted in a narrow focus on improved technology, digitization, and a specialized focus on certain diseases. While this benefits high-income populations, most marginalized SC-ST communities exist without basic medical care. The primary healthcare system comprises sub-centres and primary health centres. A sub-centre serves a small population (3,000 - 5,000) and is run by a male and female nurse (at least). A primary health centre is a unit of six sub-centres and enables access to a medical officer. The patient-to-doctor and patient-to-bed ratio are extremely poor in these centres and there is limited availability of medication. Infrastructural growth of these centres would incentivize working in these centres. This again highlights the relationship between good healthcare and the economy.

There are several government-funded health insurance schemes: Employees' State Insurance Scheme (1952), Central Government Health Scheme(1954), Universal Health Insurance Scheme (2003), Aam Aadmi Bima Yojana, Rashtriya Swasthya Bima Yojana (RSBY, 2008), and Ayushman Bharat- Pradhan Mantri Jay Arogya Yojana (PM-JAY, 2018). In addition to this, there are State specific insurance schemes. The National Rural Health Mission was launched by the prime minister in 2005 to provide equitable healthcare to vulnerable groups. Some of the key features of NRHM include- the scaling up of public spending to 2–3% of the GDP for vulnerable populations; a focus on primary health care and improvement in secondary and tertiary referral facilities; and the implementation of a conditional cash transfer scheme to encourage facility-based births. The RSBY scheme targeted families living below the poverty line (BPL). It works by sharing the risk of a major health catastrophe by pooling the risks across many households. This scheme was succeeded by the PM-JAY scheme. This scheme emphasized achieving universal healthcare in the country by using the sustainable development goals as the guiding principles. The Ayushman Bharat Program aims to establish 15,000 health and wellness centres to improve the structure of primary healthcare. PM-JAY provide coverage of up to Rs. 5 lakhs per family for secondary and tertiary healthcare; it is the largest health insurance scheme in the world. According to the Indian Inequality Report of 2021, only 14 per cent of both SC and ST households are enrolled in PM-JAY. Most government-funded health insurance schemes failed because of the financial catastrophes marginalised households experienced in covering out-of-pocket expenses like oral drugs and medical tests. Although these plans hoped to target underprivileged families, a majority of families availing these schemes are on the higher income end. One of the goals of the National Health Policy, 2017 is the provision of ensuring free access to high-quality primary care through government services. This would require an increased expenditure in healthcare from the current 0.32 per cent of annual GDP.

Other measures that are currently being followed but need to be scaled up include: mandatory medical examinations of SC and ST individuals for detection of HIV, tuberculosis, and other communicable and non-communicable diseases; research is being carried out by the Indian Council of Medical Research on healthcare problem unique to the tribal community; several village based ASHA, Anganwadi workers, and Panchayat workers have been trained to aid the government in monitoring SC-ST health outcome; and the Swacch Bharat Abhiyan has increased focus on access to sanitation and toilets, especially in rural households. The Niti Aayog recommends improving data linkages between the National Digital Health Mission and the National Health Mission to leverage data on health outcomes. However, the government would have to address the digital divide in India. Thus we see that the government has taken several steps to improve healthcare access and coverage but a shift towards a robust primary healthcare structure integrated with awareness and economic development is essential for uprooting caste-based disparities in healthcare.

== Future outlook ==
Since independence, the Indian government has recognized the importance of improving Dalit health. There is an increased emphasis on studying the cross-cutting interactions of caste and income and how it affects health outcomes. Literacy, economic status, and health are positively correlated with each other. Improved literacy rates, especially in women have shown a positive effect on healthcare utilization by marginalized families. Similarly, land redistribution schemes have been seen as an important step in Dalit empowerment. However, most states failed to implement this policy. For instance, in Maharashtra, only 5% of 8,54,000 Dalit families received any land. Studies find that a trickling down of the funds allocated by ministries for Dalit development limits the efficacy of the planned programs.

The rise of Dalit political parties and organizations has created pressure to allocate more funds to Dalit development. Currently, the census does not collect information on healthcare outcomes by social group. Researchers suggest that improved data availability will enable better policy analysis. To improve Dalit healthcare access, the government is advised to improve its healthcare expenses and also establish Dalit-centric programs. The India Inequality Report recommends that the government increase primary healthcare funding to strengthen all basic healthcare access The report also highlights the positive correlation between low socioeconomic polarity and improved health outcomes. Educational campaigns to eradicate the societal roots of caste-based discrimination are key in achieving healthcare equality. Studies carried out by NGOs show that empowering local Dalit leaders, training vocal activists, and forming solidarity groups for community monitoring can increase healthcare utilization and outcome. Affirmative action policies need to be supplemented with improved education to remove social hierarchies from the grassroots. Vocational and skill-based training can supplement land reform efforts in providing financial independence to Dalit households. While the percentage of Dalit households covered by some form of insurance is higher than that in general caste households, due to a high-income gap and high out-of-pocket expenses these households still access less medical care. Increasing insurance coverage using public-private partnerships has been emphasized by economists. Improved spending in general healthcare and targeted funding towards Dalit programs is needed. Programs led by NGOs show that community-based monitoring, designating and training community activists, and forming solidarity groups can improve healthcare utilization in Dalit communities. Successful execution of these efforts can potentially help India improve healthcare access for marginalized castes and move towards universal healthcare.

== See also ==
- Dalit feminism
- Caste system in Nepal
- Caste-related violence in India
