= Mahatma Jyotiba Phule Jan Arogya Yojana =

Healthcare in Maharashtra, India

- Logo of Rajiv Gandhi Jeevandayee Arogya Yojana
- Founded: 2 July 2012; 14 years ago
- Purpose: Below Poverty Line and marginally Above Poverty Line families
- Origins: India
- Region served: Maharashtra
- Services: Free health insurance
- Owner: Government of Maharashtra
- Website: jeevandayee.gov.in

Mahatma Jyotiba Phule Jan Arogya Yojana, previously Rajiv Gandhi Jeevandayee Arogya Yojana (RGJAY), is a Universal health care scheme run by the Government of Maharashtra for the poor people of the state of Maharashtra who holds one of the 4 cards issued by the government; Antyodaya card, Annapurna card, yellow ration card or orange ration card. The scheme was first launched in 8 districts of the Maharashtra state in July 2012 and then across all 35 districts of the state in November 2015. It provides free access to medical care in government empanelled 488 hospitals for 971 types of diseases, surgeries and therapies costing up to Rs.1,50,000 per year per family (Rs.2,50,000 only for renal transplant). As of 17 January 2016, around 11.81 lakh procedures amounting to Rs.1827 crore have been performed on patients from 7.13 lakh beneficiary families which includes over 7.27 lakh surgeries and therapies. The scheme is called successful amid some allegations of hospitals directly or indirectly causing patients to incur out-of-pockets expenses on some part of the treatment.

== History ==
In 1997, the then Chief Minister of Maharashtra Manohar Joshi started 'Jeevandayee Yojana' for the poor people which covered cost of treatment of very serious illnesses. But this scheme had shortcomings. This scheme was used to cover only 4 procedures related to brain, heart, kidney and cancer. Also Rashtriya Swasthya Bima Yojana (RSBY) launched by the Government of India in 2008 had largely failed, while the Aarogyasri health insurance scheme of neighbouring Andhra Pradesh state had become very successful. So the Maharashtra government closed the RSBY scheme, revamped the old 1997 'Jeevandayee Yojana' and modelled it on the 'Aarogyasri' scheme of the Andhra Pradesh to cover 971 types of surgeries, therapies, procedures. It was renamed as 'Rajiv Gandhi Jeevandayee Arogya Yojana' after the former Prime Minister Rajiv Gandhi and it was launched as pilot project on 2 July 2012 over eight districts of the Maharashtra state and it covered 52.37 lakh families. These districts were Mumbai, Thane, Dhule, Nanded, Amravati, Gadchiroli, Solapur and Raigad. Under this scheme, more than 1 lakh procedures were carried out between July 2012 and October 2013. Following the success of this pilot scheme, government of Maharashtra decided to launch this scheme in all 35 districts of the state.

== Overview ==
=== Introduction ===
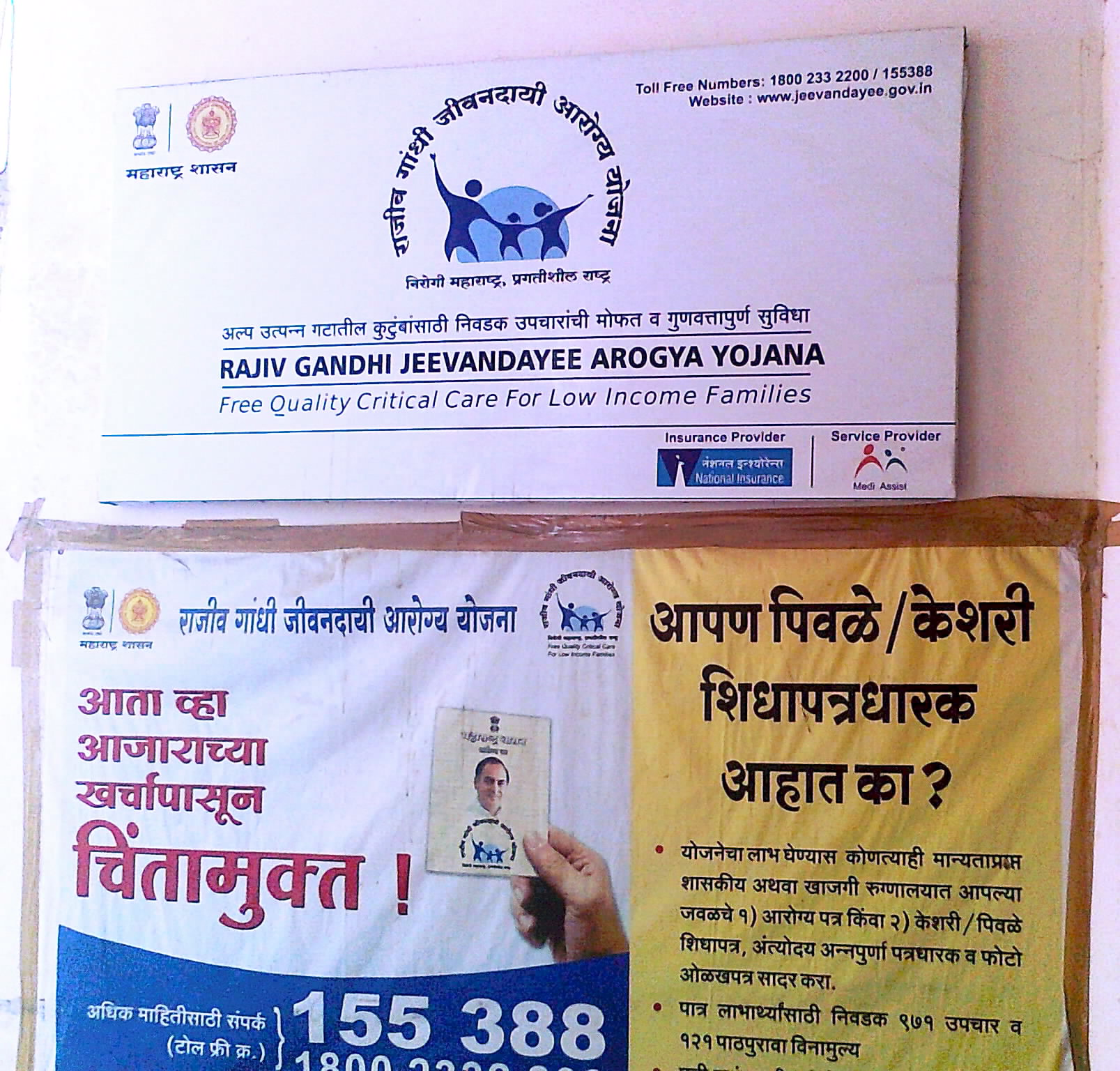
RGJAY information board in an empanelled hospital

The scheme was launched in all 35 districts of the Maharashtra on 21 November 2013 at Nagpur by the Indian National Congress president Sonia Gandhi in the presence of Maharashtra Chief Minister Prithviraj Chavan, Maharashtra Health Minister Suresh Shetty, Union Agriculture Minister Sharad Pawar, and others. The scheme now covers around 2.11 crore families from 35 districts of the Maharashtra state.

Under this scheme, Maharashtra govt pays insurance premium of Rs.333 plus taxes per year per one beneficiary family to the public sector National Insurance Company towards Rs.1,50,000 health insurance policy and the beneficiary family gets medical access for 971 surgeries, therapies and procedures in the government empanelled hospitals. The scheme covers pre-existing diseases and ailments. The scheme is launched on floater basis; that means a single member of family can get free medical access costing up to Rs.150,000 in one year or whole family can get free medical access costing up to Rs.150,000 in one year. Renal transplant is treated exceptional case and government offers up to Rs.250,000 per year for this operation. In December 2015 Maharashtra govt announced increase in limit on kidney transplant expenses from Rs 2.50 lakh to Rs 3 lakh which includes medical check-up of kidney donor and receiver. Govt also announced separate funds for poor patients to undergo dialysis.

=== Statistics ===
As per RGJAY society, 6,61,333 and surgeries/procedures were carried out throughout Maharashtra under this scheme until 15 November 2015 which amounted to 1641.10 crore rupees. Until December 2015, RGJAY Society had empanelled 476 hospitals across the Maharashtra state out of which 76 were government hospitals. Out of 6.62 lakh surgeries, 3.5 lakh were major surgeries and cancer surgeries ranked first followed by kidney and heart surgeries.

The TISS report observed that in public hospitals 53% beneficiaries were yellow ration card holders (BPL beneficiaries) while 47% beneficiaries were orange ration card holders (non-BPL beneficiaries). The report further observed that in private hospitals, 63% beneficiaries were orange ration card holders and 37% beneficiaries were yellow ration card holders.

Statistics of beneficiaries are daily updated on RGJAY Society website which reflects data since 2 July 2012 i.e. since the commencement of the scheme. As per these statistics available as of 17 January 2016, 12,48,970 patients (from 7,22,703 beneficiary families) were enrolled across the Maharashtra state out of which 11,81,066 patients were registered. The govt has incurred 1827.7 Crore rupees until 17 January 2016 for the treatment of these patients. Out of 11,81,066 patients, surgeries and therapies were carried out on 7,27,437 patients. 14,210 death cases have occurred; 5,300 patients died in govt hospitals while 8,910 patients died in private hospitals. 6169 health camps were organized across the Maharashtra state.

== Eligibility ==
Below Poverty Line families having income less than one lakh rupees per annum and who holds either Antyodaya card or Annapurna card or Yellow or orange ration card are eligible for free medical access under this scheme. The scheme does not cover Above Poverty Line families which holds white ration card. Data from valid card coupled with Aadhar card is used to issue 'Rajiv Gandhi Jeevandayee Arogya Yojana Health Card' to the beneficiary family which bears names, ages and photos of family members. Until this health card is issued, valid ration card and Aadhar card (or driving license, voter's ID card issued by the Election Commission of India) can be used to gain access to free medical care under this scheme.

== Benefits ==
The scheme covers 971 surgeries, therapies and procedures which falls under following 30 categories:

- 1 General surgery
- 2 ENT surgery
- 3 Ophthalmology surgery
- 4 Gynaecology and obstetrics surgery
- 5 Orthopedic surgery and procedures
- 6 Surgical gastroenterology
- 7 Cardiac and cardiothoracic surgery
- 8 Pediatric surgery
- 9 Genitourinary system
- 10 Neurosurgery
- 11 Surgical oncology
- 12 Medical oncology
- 13 Radiation oncology
- 14 Plastic surgery
- 15 Burns
- 16 Poly trauma
- 17 Prostheses
- 18 Critical care
- 19 General medicine
- 20 Infectious diseases
- 21 Pediatrics medical management
- 22 Cardiology
- 23 Nephrology
- 24 Neurology
- 25 Pulmonology
- 26 Dermatology
- 27 Rheumatology
- 28 Endocrinology
- 29 Gastroenterology
- 30 Interventional radiology

Out of 971 procedures, 131 procedures are performed only in government hospitals. Illnesses which can be treated in primary health center or any other ordinary hospital are not covered under this scheme. Pneumonia is not covered, but advanced and serious forms of this disease and other lung related procedures like lobar pneumonia, bronchopneumonia, aspiration pneumonia, pneumoconiosis, pneumothorax, pneumonectomy, etc. are covered in this scheme. Diarrhea is not covered, but various surgical and medical gastroenterology procedures are included in this scheme. diabetes is not covered, but advanced and complicated stages of diabetes like diabetic retinopathy, diabetic ketoacidosis, uncontrolled diabetes with infectious emergencies etc. are covered under this scheme. Snakebite without ventilation support is not covered, but snakebite with ventilation support is covered under this scheme. Hernia and appendicitis are not covered, but Diaphragmatic hernia and appendicular perforation are covered. In emergency case of appendicitis, hospital may admit the patient and RGJAY Society may approve the package mentioned in the policy.

In the original scheme knee replacement and hip replacement surgeries were not included. In July 2015 it was reported that the government was considering to include these surgeries in the scheme and roll out the same from November 2015.

== System ==
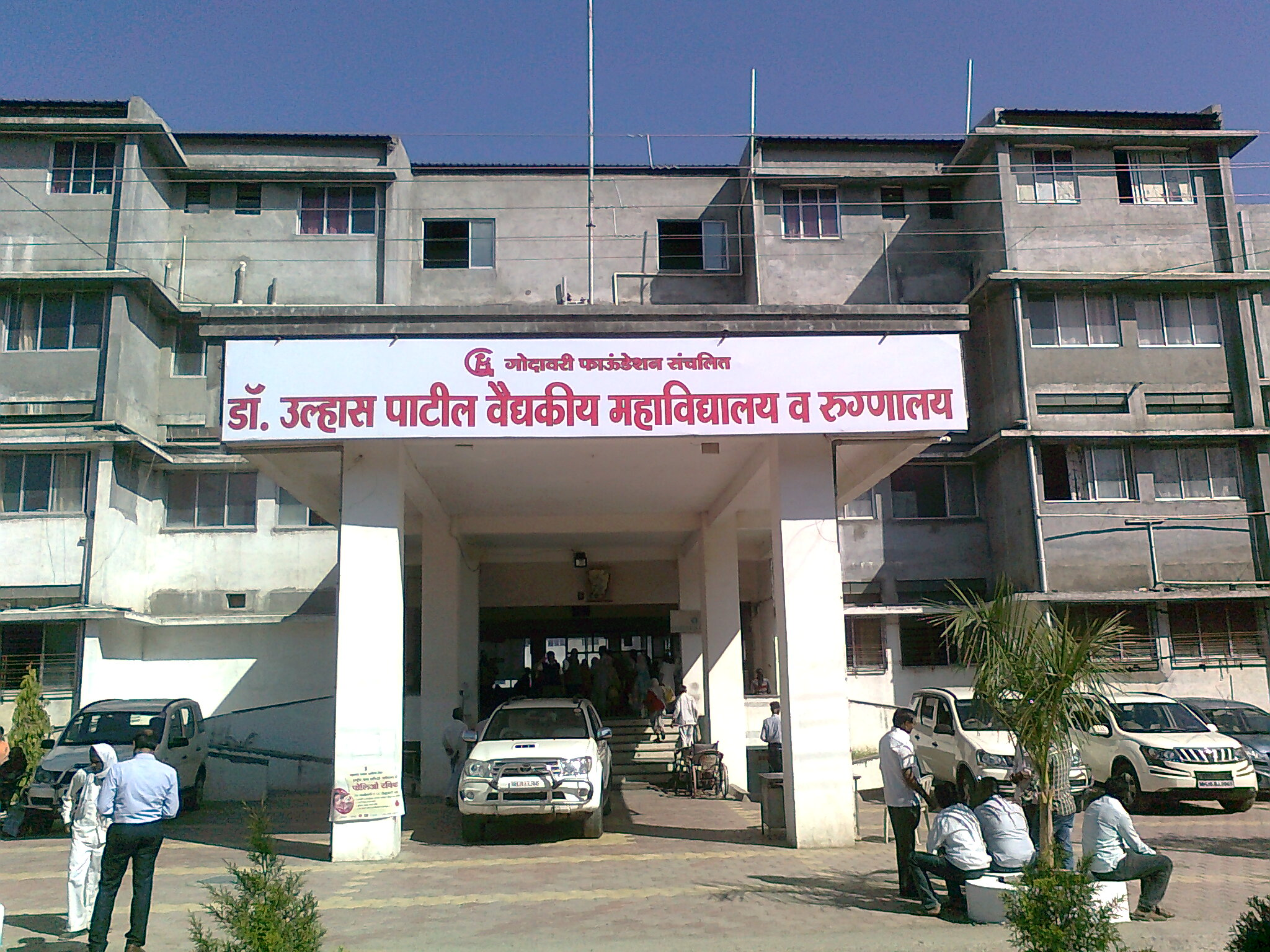
Dr. Ulhas Patil Medical College And Hospital at Jalgaon - one of the RGJAY empanelled network hospital

Maharashtra govt has formed 'Rajiv Gandhi Jeevandayee Arogya Yojana Society' (RGJAY Society) to implement and monitor this scheme in coordination with the National Insurance Company (NIC). RGJAY Society and NIC has identified eligible hospitals throughout the Maharashtra and has empanelled them to implement this scheme. As of January 2016, 488 hospitals are empanelled at 35 district places. NIC and RGJAY Society has connected all of these hospitals through a computer network with dedicated database of beneficiary families. These hospitals are referred as 'Network Hospitals'.

The beneficiary patient can directly approach the network hospital. Or the patient can be referred to the network hospital by a doctor in nearby govt hospital (run by the Zilla Parishad) or by a doctor in health camp.

=== Network hospital ===
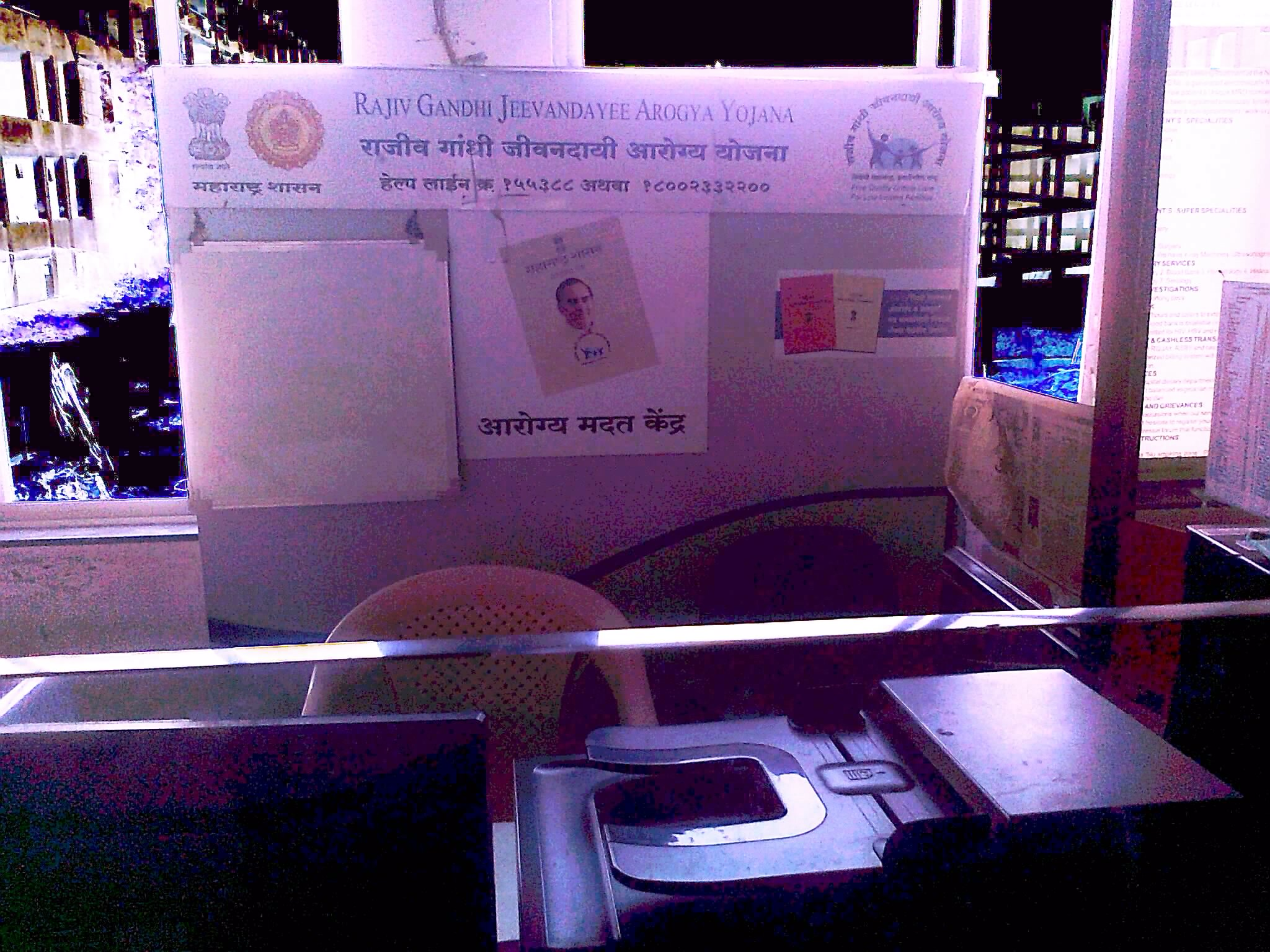
RGJAY Aarogyamitra help center in one of the RGJAY empanelled network hospital

The govt has appointed 'Aarogyamitra' (Health Friend) in all network hospitals. This Aarogyamitra checks referral card, health card or any other necessary documents. If all documents are in order, the network hospital admits the patient and sends online pre-authorization request to the insurer NIC which can also be reviewed by the RGJAY Society. The preauthorization request is processed within 24 hours. In emergency cases, network hospital can give telephonic intimation to the NIC and approval can be granted immediately.

Once the patient is admitted, all expenses pertaining to the patient are borne by the hospital and thereafter the hospital sends bill to the insurer NIC for reimbursement. These expenses include bed charges in general ward, nursing and boarding charges, fees of doctors involved in the treatment (surgeons, anaesthetists, medical practitioner etc.), consultants fees, cost of anaesthesia, blood bottles, oxygen, operating theater charges, cost of surgical appliances, medicines and drugs, cost of prosthetic devices, implants, X-ray and diagnostic tests, food to inpatient, one side transport cost (from Hospital to residence of patient only by bus or railway. The scheme does not cover ambulance charges for transporting patient from home to hospital or from one hospital to another hospital.) etc. That means, the patient can walk in hospital without a single rupee in his pocket and come out after full treatment of his ailment without paying any money for anything related to his treatment. The insurer has identified 125 procedures for free follow-up consultation and medicine. If the illness of the patient falls under these 125 procedures, then the hospital also covers cost of follow-up consultation and free medicine for one year from the date of discharge of the patient.

NABH audit of network hospitals is mandatory. Government hospitals which have A1 grade gets full reimbursement of expenses incurred on the patients. Other government hospitals which have grades below A1 receives more than 10% cuts in the refund.

=== Health camp ===
The process of health camps organizations is coordinated by the RGJAY Society and NIC and MDIndia Healthcare seNices acts as the third-party administrator. The venue of the health camp is identified by the district collector (or by the additional commissioner in case of BMC). Thereafter district coordinator of NIC, TPA and district health officer organizes the health camp in consultation with the network hospital and the district collector. Local NGOs can also participate in the organization of health camp. Organization of health camp is publicised through newspaper advertisements, pamphlets, local cable network, public address system etc. At least 6 MBBS doctors - 3 male and 3 female - are required to attend the patients along with 10 Aarogyamitras (5 male and 5 female).

Objectives of the health camp includes identifying beneficiary families and creating awareness about the scheme among them, training generalist medical officers of primary health centers (PHCs) about 971 types of procedures so that they can refer the patients from PHCs to network hospitals after proper screening, training Aarogyamitras of PHCs about helping patients in proper documentary work etc. Basic amenities -like shade, fans, chairs, water, snacks etc. - are provided to the patients attending the camp.

Network hospital is required to carry screening equipments like stethoscope, sphygmomanometer, glucometer, thermometer, ECG machine, fundoscope, pseudoscope, weigh machine, height scale, otoscope, tuning fork etc. Network hospital is also required to carry common drugs which includes ibuprofen, paracetamol, aspirin, diclofenac sodium, metronidazole, albendazole, norfloxacin, ciprofloxacin, ampicillin, ranitidine, B-complex etc. Doctors in health camp are required to carry out following investigations on the patients - hemogram, ESR, BSL, blood group, routine microscopic X-ray, fundoscopy, otoscopy, radiological ECG, USG, vision test, hearing test etc.

After proper screening, if the illness of patient does not fall within 971 predefined procedures, then only free consultation is provided to the patient. If the illness falls within predefined 971 procedures, then free treatment and medicine is given to the patient in the health camp. If the patient can be treated only in the network hospital, then doctors give 'Health Camp Referral Card' to the patient which mentions all the details and date of appointment.

== Updates ==
In February 2016, it was reported that the Maharashtra govt has decided to remove 130 procedures and add new 270 procedures in the scheme when it will sign fresh MOU with the insurance company in November 2016. Senior citizens will be the focus of new amended scheme. Govt may modify criteria of 'minimum 30 beds' to accommodate smaller hospitals in the interior area of Maharashtra. The State Government of Maharashtra launched a health insurance scheme, Rajiv Gandhi Jeevandayee Arogya Yojana (RGJAY) on 2 July 2012 in 8 districts of Maharashtra (Phase 1) and later on introduced to remaining 28 districts of Maharashtra (Phase 2). The scheme is renamed as Mahatma Jyotiba Phule Jan Arogya Yojana from 1 April 2017.

== Grievances ==
Under this scheme, full treatment of the beneficiary patient is supposed to be free and cashless, but as per Tata Institute of Social Sciences, 63% beneficiary patients had incurred out-of-pocket expenses for diagnostics, treatment or consumables. As per TISS, the reasons included lack of time to do paperwork, unawareness about the benefits of the scheme, lack of cooperation from the hospital staff etc. RGJAY Society denied this claim by stating that 6.62 lakh procedures were carried out, but only 6232 grievances were received which amounts to only 0.94%. The Society further said that out of 6232 grievances, 82.22% grievances were resolved. The Society has cancelled empanelment of 102 hospitals and 7 hospitals were suspended from the scheme.
