= Ayushman Bharat Yojana =

Healthcare programme in India

- Type of project: Health insurance
- Country: India
- Prime Minister(s): Narendra Modi
- Ministry: Ministry of Health and Family Welfare
- Launched: 23 September 2018; 8 years ago
- Budget: ₹17,588 crore (US$1.8 billion) (2026–27)
- Status: Active
- Website: www.pmjay.gov.in

Ayushman Bharat Pradhan Mantri Jan Arogya Yojana (AB PM-JAY) is a national public health insurance scheme of the Government of India that aims to provide free access to health insurance coverage for low income earners in the country. Roughly, the bottom 50% of the country qualifies for this scheme. It was launched in September 2018 by Prime Minister Narendra Modi.

Ayushman Bharat Pradhan Mantri Jan Arogya Yojana was later expanded to include all citizens aged 70 years and above, regardless of their economic status.

People using the program access their own primary care services from a family doctor and when anyone needs additional care, PM-JAY provides free secondary health care for those needing specialist treatment and tertiary health care for those requiring hospitalization.

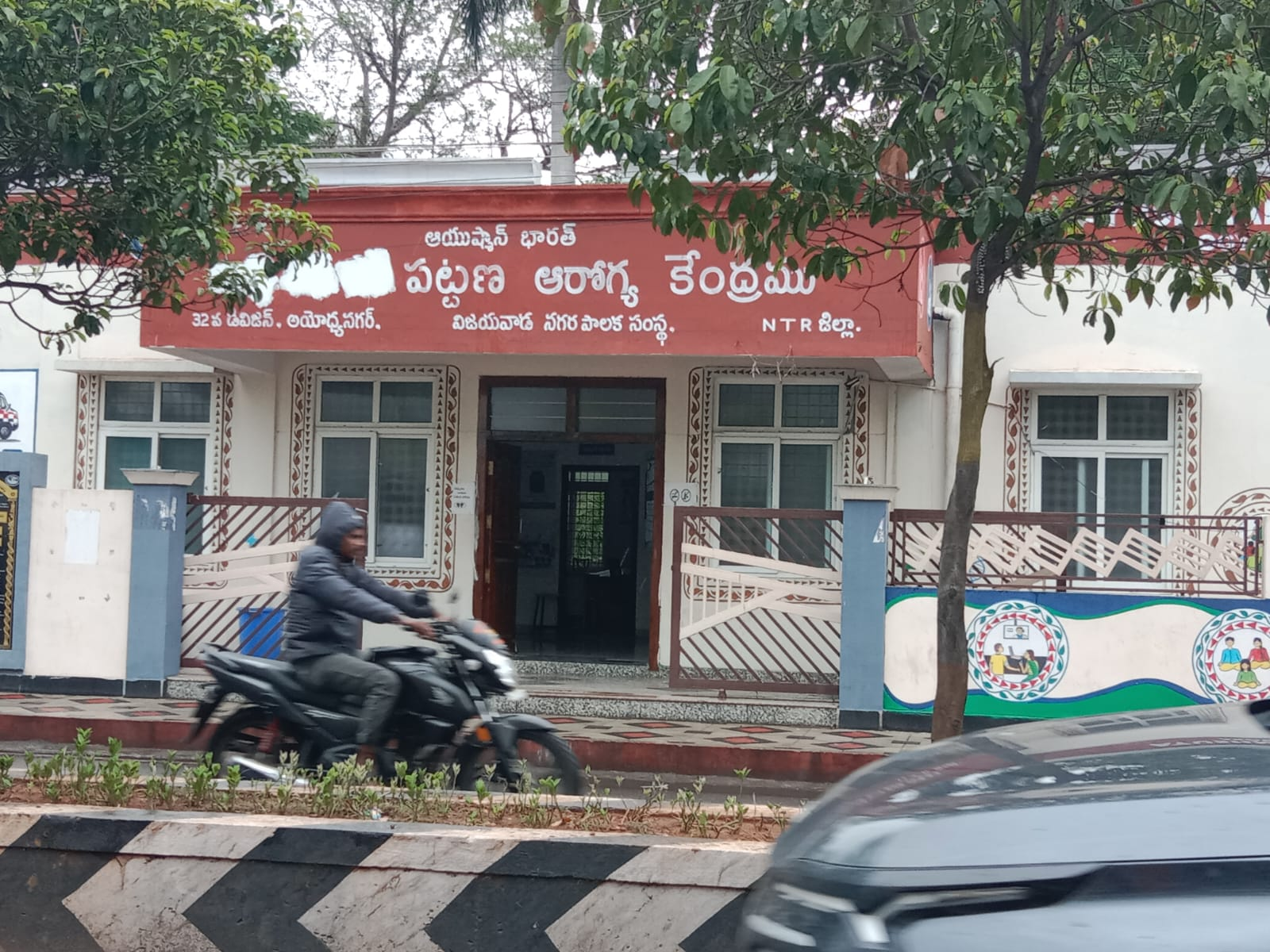
Urban healthcare center, 32nd Division Vijayawada, NTR District, Andhra Pradesh

The programme is part of the Indian government's National Health Policy and is means-tested. That ministry later established the National Health Authority as an organization to administer the program. It is a centrally sponsored scheme and is jointly funded by both the union government and the states. By offering services to 50 crore (500 million) people it is the world's largest government sponsored healthcare program. The program is a means-tested program, considering its users are people categorized as low income in India. However it is not implemented in all state due to the state government's divergent views.

== History ==
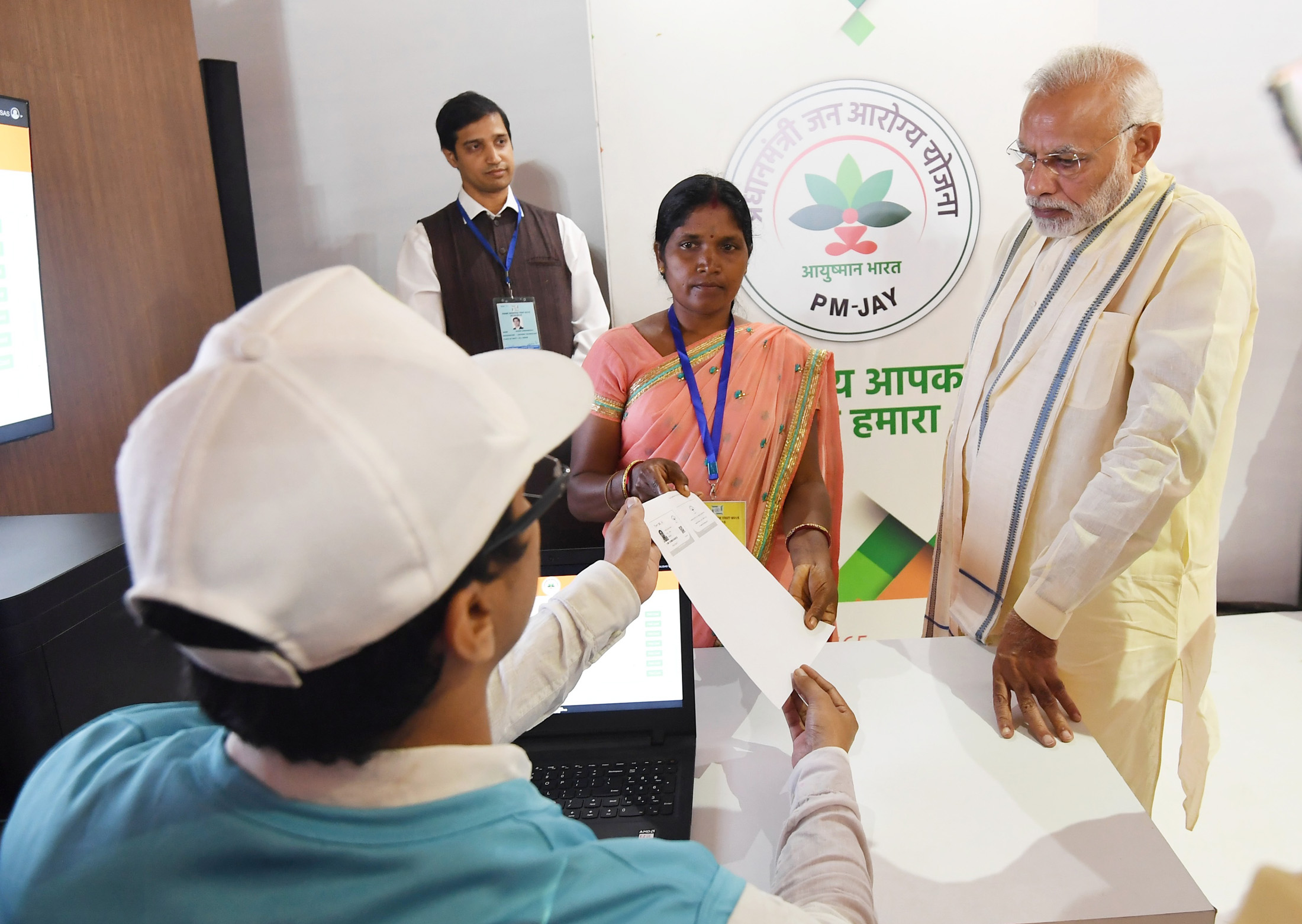
Prime Minister, Narendra Modi visiting an exhibition on Ayushman Bharat, at Ranchi, in Jharkhand

In 2017 an Indian version of the Global Burden of Disease Study reported major diseases and risk factors from 1990 to 2016 for every state in India. This study brought much interest in government health policy because it identified major health challenges which the government could address. A large percentage of the population is left underserved by the Indian health system, which relies on out-of-pocket payments from patients to fund care. These payments hinder many patients from being able to receive healthcare services. In 2018, the Indian government described that every year, more than six crores Indians were pushed into poverty because of out-of-pocket medical expenses. Despite various available regional and national programs for healthcare in India, there was much more to be done. The Indian government first announced the Ayushman Bharat Yojana as a universal health care plan in February 2018 in the 2018 Union budget of India. The Union Council of Ministers approved it in March. In his 2018 Independence Day speech Prime Minister Narendra Modi announced that India would have a major national health program later that year on 25 September, also commemorating the birthday of Pandit Deendayal Upadhyaya.

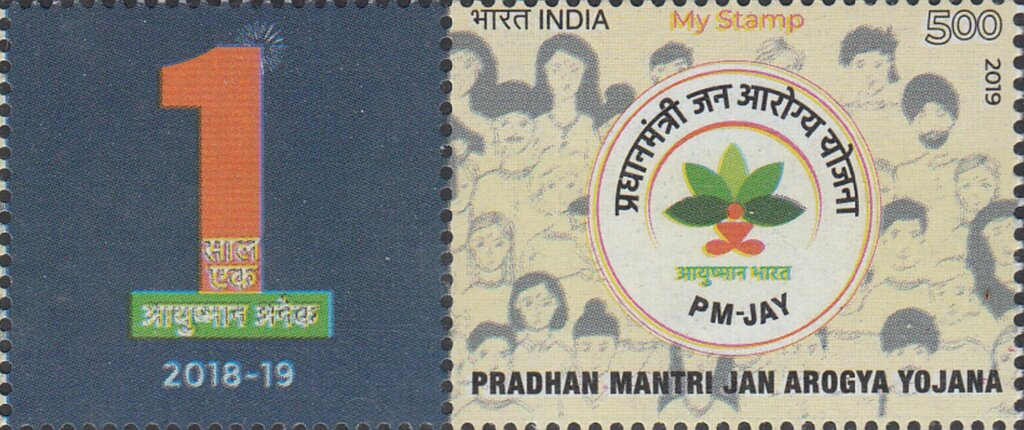
PM-JAY stamp

AB PM-JAY was first launched on 23 September 2018 at Ranchi, Jharkhand. By 26 December 2020 the scheme was extended to the Union Territories of Jammu Kashmir and Ladakh. The program has been called "ambitious".

In September 2024, the Ayushman Bharat Pradhan Mantri Jan Arogya Yojna was extended to include the senior population of the country, irrespective of their economic background. Seniors received an additional Rs. 5 lakh (approximately $5,300 USD as of 2026), to be used solely for their own care. Seniors receiving insurance under other governmental initiatives or private insurers would also be covered.

== Features ==
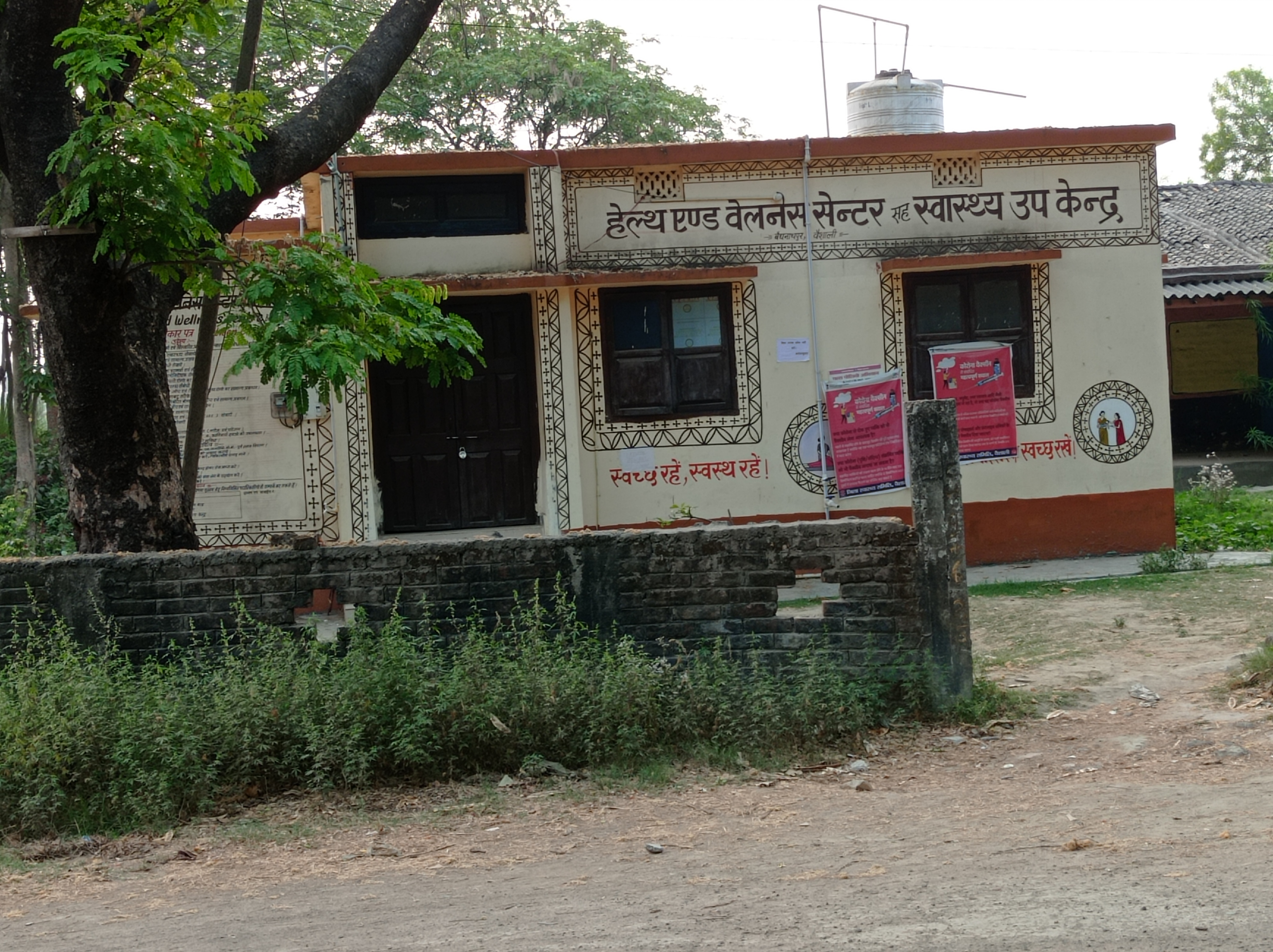
A health and wellness centre established as a part of Ayushman Bharat Yojna at Mahua community development bloc, Bihar.

Features of PM-JAY include the following— providing health coverage to 10 crores households or 50 crores Indians; providing a cover of ₹5 lakh (equivalent to ₹6.1 lakh or US$6,400 in 2026) per family per year for medical treatment in empaneled hospitals, both public and private; offering cashless payment and paperless recordkeeping through the hospital or doctor's office; using criteria from the Socio Economic and Caste Census 2011 to determine eligibility for benefits; no restriction on family size, age or gender; all pre-existing medical conditions are covered under the scheme; it covers 3 days of pre-hospitalisation and 15 days of post-hospitalisation, including diagnostic care and expenses on medicines; the scheme is portable and a beneficiary can avail medical treatment at any PM-JAY empanelled hospital outside their state and anywhere in the country.

In India, rather than focusing on strengthening essential primary, secondary, and tertiary healthcare in the public system, a shift toward an insurance-based system has been promoted. Chronic underfunding of India's public health sector compared to private sector, and the liberalization of the market for private health insurance by the Indian government in the late 1990s resulted in increased health disparities, as private health insurance is primarily accessible to economically advantaged groups. In the mid-2000s, government-funded health insurance emerged as a new type of healthcare financing, helping individuals prevent catastrophic out-of-pocket health expenditures. Through this model, the state would pay premiums to private insurers that would allow eligible individuals to receive free treatment at any public or private institution that has joined the PMJAY scheme. The Indian government recognized that individual out-of-pocket expenditures were pushing people into poverty and treatment in government hospitals could not protect people against catastrophic health expenditures. The alternative of government-funded health insurance allows poorer individuals to still be able to access private health care without the extra expenses.

=== Impact ===
The revenue of government hospitals has increased due to the Ayushman scheme, patients are receiving better facilities. Previously patients hesitant to visit government hospitals due to the lack of healthcare amenities; people now flock to these hospitals as they trust them for treatment under the Ayushman scheme.

The Lancet reported a 36% increase in early detection and treatment of cancer over six years, attributed to the PMJAY. Timely treatment, defined as starting within 30 days of diagnosis, improved significantly for the beneficiaries, who experienced a 90% increase in access compared to a 30% improvement for non-enrollees.

Ayushman Bharat Pradhan Mantri Jan Arogya Yojana (PM-JAY) has sanctioned hospital treatments worth ₹1.73 lakh crore, as informed in the Rajya Sabha. Since its launch, the scheme has recorded over 116.9 million hospital admissions. It provides health insurance coverage of up to ₹5 lakh per eligible family per year. The scheme targets nearly 40% of India's economically vulnerable population and includes thousands of empaneled public and private hospitals.

== Implementation ==
=== Participation by states and union territories ===
In September 2018, shortly after launch some states and territories declined to participate in the program. Maharashtra, Kerala, Tamil Nadu and Telangana initially declined to join it because they each had their own state healthcare programmes. Those programs such as Mahatma Jyotiba Phule Jan Arogya Yojana were already functioning well. These states later joined Ayushman Bharat Yojana with special exceptions to make it part of their existing infrastructures. West Bengal initially joined the program but then opted out in favor of establishing its own regional health programme before rejoining in May 2026. Delhi and Odisha joined the scheme in April 2025.

=== Participation by local people ===
In May 2020, Prime Minister Narendra Modi said in his radio show Mann Ki Baat that the Ayushman Bharat scheme had recently benefited more than one crore people. By May 2020, the scheme had provided more than 1 crore treatments with a value of ₹13,412 crore. The number of public and private hospitals empanelled nationwide stands at 24,432. The Ayushman Bharat Yojana programme announced a special collaboration with the Employees' State Insurance programme in November 2019. From June 2020, the program had entered a pilot to cover 120,000 workers with that insurance at 15 hospitals.

== Challenges ==
When Ayushman Bharat Yojana (Ayushman Card) began there were questions of how to reconcile its plans with other existing health development recommendations, such as from NITI Aayog. A major challenge of implementing a national health care scheme would be starting with infrastructure in need of development to be part of a modern national system. While Ayushman Bharat Yojana seeks to provide excellent healthcare, India still has some basic healthcare challenges including relatively few doctors, more cases of infectious disease, and a national budget with a comparatively low central government investment in health care. Some of the problems lay outside the Health Ministry such as urban development or transport. While many government hospitals have joined the program, many private corporate hospitals have not. The private hospitals report that they would be unable to offer their special services at the government low price, even with a government subsidy.

There has been misuse of the Ayushman Bharat scheme by private hospitals through submission of fake medical bills. Under the Scheme, surgeries have been claimed to be performed on persons who had been discharged long ago and dialysis has been shown as performed at hospitals not having kidney transplant facility. There are at least 697 fake cases in Uttarakhand State alone, where fine of ₹1 crore (equivalent to ₹1.2 crore or US$130,000 in 2026) has been imposed on hospitals for frauds under the Scheme. Initial analysis of high-value claims under PM-JAY has revealed that a relatively small number of districts and hospitals account for a high number of these, and some hint of an anti-women bias, with male patients getting more coverage. Despite all efforts to curb foul-play, the risk of unscrupulous private entities profiteering from gaming the system is clearly present in PM-JAY.
