= Jordana (producer) =

American music producer

Jordana LeSesne
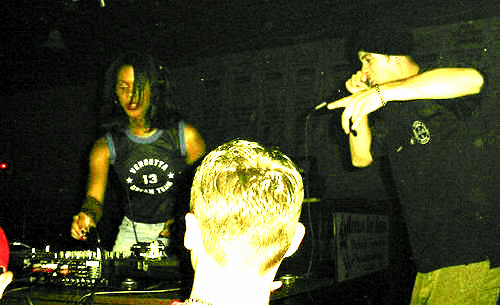
- Jordana at Technorganic Records showcase party with MC Collaborator

Background information
- Born: Pittsburgh, Pennsylvania, U.S.
- Genre: Drum and bass
- Occupations: Producer, musician, DJ
- Years active: 1992–present
- Website: www.jordana.co

Jordana LeSesne, formerly known as 1.8.7, is an American musician, producer and DJ from Pittsburgh, Pennsylvania. She now produces and performs as Jordana. She became known in the mid-1990s as a drum and bass producer. Vibe magazine called her "one of the most respected Drum ‘n' Bass producers in the US." In 2015, she was named as one of "20 women who shaped the history of dance music" by Mixmag. She is transgender and came out in 1998.

She has released over 50 tracks, including four albums, several EPs, and remixes under the alias 1.8.7. The 1997 album When Worlds Collide became known for its "dark pummeling assaults". She has licensed tracks for compilations as well as the Sci Fi Channel. Three of her albums charted in the Top 25 of both the CMJ (College Music Journal) and Mixmag U.S. (later Mixer Magazine, now defunct) for 1997 as well as 1998 and 1999. Her third album "The Cities Collection" debuted in the CMJ Top 5 climbed to the #2 position on CMJ Music Monthly's dance chart for June 2000.

Her works have been reviewed by Billboard, Spin, Rolling Stone, Urb, Mixer, Mixmag, Raygun, as well as Knowledge – the U.K. Drum and Bass magazine. In 1999, she was listed in Raygun's Who's Who of International DJs. She was one of the headlining DJs on Knowledge Magazine's 28 city Kung Fu Knowledge tour in 1999.

== Impact on music ==
Her work has influenced artists such as dubstep producer Bassnectar, who heavily sampled 5 A.M. Rinse (feat. MC Sphinx), the last song on her first album When Worlds Collide for his song Here We Go of his 2010 EP and single Timestretch. She has since unaligned herself with the aforementioned and is currently still awaiting some unpaid royalties promised to her by Bassnectar. Additionally, electronic rock act Celldweller sampled "Wake Up" off of her first album as well as "San Francisco" off of her third album "The Cities Collection" in their 2013 song "Uncrowned".

In 1999, Drum & Bass/Hip Hop producer and label owner Hive approached Jordana to remix her song Defcon-1 also off of When Worlds Collide. Hive's remix appears on his 2001 album The Raw Uncut. Jordana collaborated with Lady Sovereign on a song early in Sov's career after the two met through an internet chat room for StrikeFM.co.uk, an online radio station which Jordana had a show, and the now defunct UKGarageWorldwide.com forums. The two would later team up when Jordana under her Lady J alias, had Lady Sovereign MC for her radio show on Flex FM London.

== History ==
She first came to the attention of the music industry when she was asked to remix Blondie's "Atomic." Her remix appeared along with an Armand Van Helden remix on the single. A little over a year following that release, Mac McFarlane, the promoter of the well established and legendary New York City club, Konkrete Jungle, contacted her to create a themed song for a CD compilation/mix-CD. Jordana created the song "Konkrete Jungle" for that purpose. Described by CMJ as containing "menacing hardstep attacks", it was released on the Ultra Records compilation, Konkrete Jungle - Maximum Drum & Bass, mixed by BBC Radio 1 Drum'n'Bass show host Jumpin Jack Frost. Following extensive touring throughout North America and abroad as a music producer, Liquid Sky Music, an indie label distributed by Caroline Distribution signed her to a three-album contract in late 1996.

== Hate crime in Ohio ==
On the night of February 22, 2000 in Kent, Ohio, Jordana was attacked and beaten in a hate crime by a group of men including Matthew Gostlin. Gostlin and other assailants vaulted her in the parking lot outside of the Robin Hood nightclub where she had just performed on the Cities Collection tour. The group of men attacked suddenly and Jordana lost consciousness almost immediately after being struck in the face. She suffered nerve damage to the lower part of her face as a result. She was quoted, saying in the May 2000 issue of CMJ New Music Monthly that in the seconds just prior to the attack: "I saw his face. I remember the look on his face. It was this look of utter hate" In an interview with the Village Voice, George Meesig, a man from Cleveland, Ohio who defended her during the attack, stated that Gostlin had misgendered her, saying “this is personal”. Other reports noted by the Village Voice on the message board for Breakbeat Science (a Drum'n'Bass record store) mentioned transphobic slurs being shouted during the attack. She subsequently cancelled the tour. Gostlin, while charged, was never arrested nor spent any time in court. Her family was told by the Portage County (Ohio) prosecutor's office that attempts had been made to serve the warrant but Gostlin's whereabouts were unknown. She felt that justice would not be served so she left the United States for England.

== Additional work in music industry ==
In addition to music production, Jordana is a DJ, musician and singer. From 2001 to 2002, she worked at Flex FM in London, England as Lady J, with Lady Sovereign performing for her during her radio show. In 2002, she held a club residency performing UK garage, 2-step garage and house music at the club Trinity in Vauxhall.

After returning to the United States, Jordana returned to rock and fronted a goth metal band in Seattle. Prior to that, she was asked to play bass in another band briefly where she became close friends with singer Shelita Burke. She has been billed alongside Arca for Planet Zolean: Un/Tuck + Hot Mass on the Currents.FM Common Multiverse Initiative. She was featured as Mix of the Day for Resident Advisor, and recently contributed to the Daisychain Podcast. After a long hiatus Jordana has returned to DJing out and made her first appearance in over a decade at the Seattle, Washington music festival, Kremfest at Kremwerk. She's since played multiple underground raves with upcoming shows on the horizon.

In 2014, Jordana scored the documentary Free CeCe, produced and directed by Jacqueline Gares and Laverne Cox. The documentary details the struggles of CeCe McDonald, an African-American trans woman wrongfully incarcerated for murder for defending herself against an attack on her outside a Minneapolis bar.

== Literary mentions ==
She has been featured in several books. Her success in rising from living in a "rust belt" city to being an MTV-featured electronic music artist was mentioned in "The Rise of the Creative Class" by economist Richard Florida. She appears in two books detailing American electronic dance music scene history: Michaelangelo Matos's The Underground is Massive, and Rave Culture, an Insider's Overview by Jimi Fritz and Virginia Smallfry. Monica Roberts was a close confidante and cited Jordana's influence as pushing her to expand her printed publication TransGriot to a blog in 2006.

An interview with Jordana was featured in multiple books, including a book published in 2012 by rock journalist George Petros. She has spoken on her personal life in interviews for publications such as The Festival Voice, The Brooklyn Rail and href zine.

== Personal life ==
She currently lives in Seattle, Washington.

== Vinyl ==
- 1995 Blondie "Atomic (The Beautiful Drum and Bass Mix)" VV58320 Chrysalis Records/EMI
- 1996 RockStone Foundation "Dis Soun'" JS007 Jungle Sky
- 1997 V/A – Nirvana EP "We Are Not Alone" JS114 Jungle Sky
- 1997 Soul Slinger-Don't Believe "Abducted (1.8.7 Remix) JS118 Jungle Sky
- 1997 Soul Slinger-Don't Believe "Ethiopia/JungleSky (1.8.7 Megamix)" JS118 Jungle Sky
- 1997 1.8.7 – When Worlds Collide full-length album EP1 "Defcon 1"/"When Worlds Collide"/"Blueshift"/"Dragonfly" JSK121 Jungle Sky
- 1997 1.8.7 – When Worlds Collide full-length album EP2 "Wake Up"/"Distant Storm Approaching"/"Ghetto Style"/"Ghetto Style (West Philly Mix)" JSK122 Jungle Sky
- 1998 Murder 0ne (1.8.7)/T.Farmer "Annihilate"/"Memory" BOOST002 Boosted Records
- 1998 This is Jungle Sky Vol. 5: Rock N Roll EP Disc 2 "Break In"/"The Return of Shaft"/"Konkrete Jungle" Jungle Sky JSK131
- 1998 This is Jungle Sky Vol. 5: Rock N Roll EP Disc 3 "Atmosphere Remix"/"The Jam"/Beastie Boys – "Sabotage (1.8.7 JS Remix)" JSK132 Jungle Sky
- 1998 1.8.7 – Quality Rolls full-length album EP1 "Quality Rolls"/"Relax Your Mind"/"Phobic" JSK136 Jungle Sky
- 1998 1.8.7 – Quality Rolls full-length album EP2 *"Jerusalem"/"Get Amped" (215 Remix)/"Stigma" JSK 137 Jungle Sky
- 1998 1.8.7 – Quality Rolls full-length album EP3 "Rock The Party"/"Deep Stealth"/"Cross the Line" JSK138 Jungle Sky
- 1998 1.8.7 – Quality Rolls full-length album EP3 "United"/"Blue Nile"/"Reboot" JSK139 Jungle Sky
- 1999 Jordana – "Pure Funk"/Stardust – "Music Sounds Better".. [With Bass] (Jordana JS remix) *whitelabel* JSK149 Jungle Sky
- 1999 Jordana – Cities Collection 12" 1 "Hollywood (courtesy of Lucasfilm)"/"Los Angeles"/"New York" JSK157 Jungle Sky
- 1999 Jordana – Cities Collection 12" 2 "Pittsburgh"/"Miami"/"San Francisco" JSK158 Jungle Sky
- 2000 Loki and Jordana – "Murder" 12" *whitelabel*
- 2001 Jordana – "Tampa Tantrum"/"In Your Arms" 12" TECO008 Technorganic
- 2002 Lady J feat. Lady Sovereign – "The Intro Dub" (Flex FM)
- 2002 Jordana – Full Colour 12" 1 *whitelabel* ConceptAudio
- 2002 Jordana – Full Colour 12" 2 *whitelabel* ConceptAudio

== CD releases ==
- 1994 V/A – Interstellar Outback "Jungleman" ROM01 RomHyperMedia
- 1995 V/A – Scotto Presents: Drop Beats Vol.1 "Ravestock Anthem" DROP001 Drop Entertainment
- 1996 V/A – This Is Jungle Sky Vol.2 "Dis Soun" JSK008 Jungle Sky
- 1997 V/A – This is Jungle Sky Vol.4 "We Are Not Alone" JSK116 Jungle Sky
- 1997 V/A – Future Groove "We Are Not Alone" ?74321 50089 2 Ariola/BMG
- 1997 V/A – New York Junglist "We Are Not Alone" AVCD11540 Avex Trax
- 1997 Soul Slinger-Don't Believe CD "Abducted (187 Remix)" JSK120 Jungle Sky
- 1997 Soul Slinger-Don't Believe CD "Ethiopia/JungleSky" JSK120 Jungle Sky
- 1997 1.8.7 – When Worlds Collide CD album JSK124 Jungle Sky
- 1998 V/A – This is Jungle Sky Vol.5 "The Jam" JSK130 Jungle Sky
- 1998 V/A – This is Jungle Sky Vol.5 "Atmosphere Remix" JSK130 Jungle Sky
- 1998 Soul Slinger – Upload: A Continuous Mix CD "Rock the Party" JSK142 Jungle Sky
- 1998 V/A – Nu Balance: Domesticated Drum & Bass CD "5am Rinse" COA70016-2 City Of Angels
- 1998 1.8.7 – Quality Rolls CD album JSK135 Jungle Sky
- 1999 V/A – Sci Fidelity: This is Sci Fi. CD "Deep Stealth" SciFi Channel/Jungle Sky
- 1999 V/A – This is Jungle Sky Vol.6 CD "Pure Funk" JSK150 Jungle Sky
- 1999 V/A – This is Jungle Sky Vol.6 CD "Unite Remix" JSK150 Jungle Sky
- 1999 Jordana presents 1.8.7 – The Cities Collection CD album JSK162 Jungle Sky
- 1999 V/A – E-Sassin Absolute Friction CD "Worlds Apart" 21C.3007 Quantum Loop
- 2000 V/A – Digital Empire: DJ Girl "Deep Stealth" 6454-2 Cold Front Records
- 2001 Hive – The Raw Uncut EP CD "Defcon-1" (Hive Remix) VTXCD-002 Vortex Recordings
- 2002 Jordana – Full Colour album ConceptAudio Limited Release
- 2003 V/A – Girls In Space CD "In Your Arms" CD-9213 Urabon Records
- 2005 Jordana – Jordana EP CD "In Your Arms" TECO CD001 Technorganic Recordings
- 2005 Jordana – Jordana EP CD "Tampa Tantrum" TECO CD001 Technorganic Recordings
- 2005 V/A – DJ Psycle-Back From The Future CD "In Your Arms" TECO CD-9213 Technorganic Recordings
- 2005 V/A – DJ Psycle-Back From The Future CD "In Your Arms" TECO CD-9213 Technorganic Recordings
- 2008 V/A – What the Bleep & Foi Oi Oi-Feelings For Detroit Vol.3 Yabette – "Babylon (1.8.7 Remix)" EEMIX003 Electronic Enlightenment

== Digital releases ==
- 2001 Jordana - Full Colour [self released]
- 2003 Jordana - Numerology [self released]
- 2020 Jordana - Resistencia EP [self released]
- 2021 ill.Gates, Jordana and Mimi Page - The Arrival, "The Future" [Alpha Pup Records/Producer Dojo]
- 2025 Jordana - Trans and Proud [self released]
- 2025 B-Complex and Jordana feat. Zak Meow - Lorem Ipsum [Imagine Audio]
- 2025 Jordana - Slay / Slay (Levia Remix) [Imagine Audio]

== Videos ==
- We Are Not Alone (1998) – directed by MSKW1 aka Michael Whartnaby
- Defcon 1 (1998) – directed by MSKW1 aka Michael Whartnaby and DBIDWA aka Dan Bidwa
- Worlds Apart (1998) – directed by Gerard Ryan
- Atmosphere (1998) – directed by Gerard Ryan
- Ring Me Back (2002) – directed by Trevor McKinley
- The Future (2021) – animation by Adam Hatch
