= 2018 Union budget of India =

Government budget

2018 Union Budget of India 2018 Ke Liye Bhārat Kā Saṅghīya Bajaṭ
Annual Financial Statement of the Central Government for the year 2018–19 The Appropriation Bill, 2018 The Finance Bill, 2018
- Emblem of India
- Submitted by: Arun Jaitley
- Submitted to: Parliament of India
- Presented: 1 February 2018
- Passed: 1 February 2018
- Country: India
- Parliament: 16th (Lok Sabha)
- Party: Bharatiya Janata Party (BJP)
- Finance minister: Arun Jaitley
- Total revenue: ₹2,399,147 crore (equivalent to ₹37 trillion or US$390 billion in 2026)
- Total expenditures: ₹2,920,484 crore (equivalent to ₹45 trillion or US$480 billion in 2026) (grand total)
- Program spending: ₹2,442,213 crore (equivalent to ₹37 trillion or US$400 billion in 2026) (through budget)
- Tax cuts: 5% (in corporate tax for companies with turnover up to ₹250 crore (equivalent to ₹365 crore or US$39 million in 2026))
- Debt payment: ₹575,795 crore (equivalent to ₹8.8 trillion or US$94 billion in 2026)
- Deficit: ₹624,276 crore (equivalent to ₹9.6 trillion or US$100 billion in 2026) (3.3%) (Fiscal deficit) ₹416,034 crore (equivalent to ₹6.4 trillion or US$68 billion in 2026) (2.2%) (Revenue deficit)
- Website: Official website

The 2018 Union Budget of India (ISO: 2018 Ke Liye Bhārat Kā Saṅghīya Bajaṭ) was the annual financial statement (AFS), demand for grants, appropriation bill and finance bill of India for the financial year 2018–19.

It was presented to Parliament on 1 February 2018 by Finance Minister Arun Jaitley.

== Premise ==
The 2018 budget was considered to be a crucial one, as it would be the first since the rollout of the Goods and Service Tax (GST) regime in India. It was widely expected that the budget would either increase the exemption limit, or introduce a standard deduction for salaried people to reduce the tax burden, in addition to a reduction of the tax rate for the ₹5 lakh (equivalent to ₹7.3 lakh or US$7,800 in 2026)–₹10 lakh (equivalent to ₹15 lakh or US$16,000 in 2026) slab from 20% to 10%, and an increase in the 30% band above ₹10 lakh (equivalent to ₹15 lakh or US$16,000 in 2026). The budget also came on the heels of a cut in the corporate tax rate in the United States. Printing of the budget began on 20 January 2018 with the traditional Halwa ceremony.

== Significant announcements ==
The budget contained a number of significant announcements. It included a healthcare programme called the National Health Protection Scheme (Ayushman Bharat) to cover 10 crore (100 million) poor families. The Government proposed to contribute 12% to the Employees' Provident Fund for new employees for three years. It was proposed that the medical allowance and transportation allowance be replaced by a standard deduction of ₹40,000 (US$430) for salaried employees. The allocation to the Ministry of Defence was ₹404,365 crore (equivalent to ₹5.9 trillion or US$63 billion in 2026), with ₹195,947.55 crore (equivalent to ₹2.9 trillion or US$31 billion in 2026) to be spent on the day-to-day running of the armed forces, and ₹99,563.86 crore (equivalent to ₹1.5 trillion or US$16 billion in 2026) on modernisation, with the rest being allocated for pensions.

There was no reduction in personal income tax rates, and the Cess on income tax was to be increased from 3% to 4%. A 10% tax on long-term capital gains (LTCG) was reintroduced after a 14-year absence. The Corporate tax was reduced from 30% to 25% for companies with turnover up to ₹250 crore (equivalent to ₹365 crore or US$39 million in 2026). Customs duties were increased for various products. A special scheme to tackle air pollution in Delhi was also introduced. The salaries of Members of Parliament were doubled and their total emoluments are likely to go up from Rs 1.4 lakh to Rs 2.3 lakh per month. Further, the salaries will be increased every five years.

== Reactions ==
Reaction to the budget was mixed-to-positive.

=== Political ===
Political reaction to the budget was mixed. Bharatiya Janata Party (BJP) leader and Prime Minister, Narendra Modi said that the budget is "development-friendly," focused on the needs of the rural areas and will strengthen the vision of a "new-India". The Congress leader, former prime minister and noted economist Manmohan Singh suggested that the arithmetic behind the budget was "faulty". The general secretary of the Communist Party of India (Marxist) (CPI (M)), Sitaram Yechury said the budget was "unconnected to ground realities". Andhra Pradesh Chief Minister Sri.N.Chandra Babu Naidu is not satisfied with the budget planning as it completely ignored the special status and special package for the state.

Aam Aadmi Party (AAP) leader and chief minister of Delhi, Arvind Kejriwal said on Twitter that the budget contained nothing for the middle class and traders. Chief Minister of Bihar, Nitish Kumar, Janta Dal (United) (JDU) leader, praised the budget for the proposals on minimum support price for farmers and the healthcare scheme. Congress leader and former finance minister P. Chidambaram said that Finance Minister Arun Jaitley had failed the fiscal consolidation test, and that there was no relief for the average taxpayer.

=== Stock market ===
Both of India's national indices, the BSE SENSEX and NIFTY 50, fell sharply in the aftermath of the budget. The government, however, said that the fall in the stock market was not solely due to the budget. Finance and Revenue Secretary, Dr. Hasmukh Adhia said that fall in stock indices was due to global market meltdown, and not because of the reintroduction of LTCG tax, he added the government will look into the slump.

=== Others ===
Credit rating agency, Fitch, said that the budget, whilst supporting growth, does not address the problem of fiscal consolidation, and leaves the problem of India's relatively weak finances, to the next government. Economic Affairs Secretary, Subhash Chandra Garg, said, that the government would try to convince credit rating agencies, like Standard and Poor's and Fitch, on its commitments to fiscal consolidation.
