= Šaľa =

Šaľa Vágsellye
- Municipality
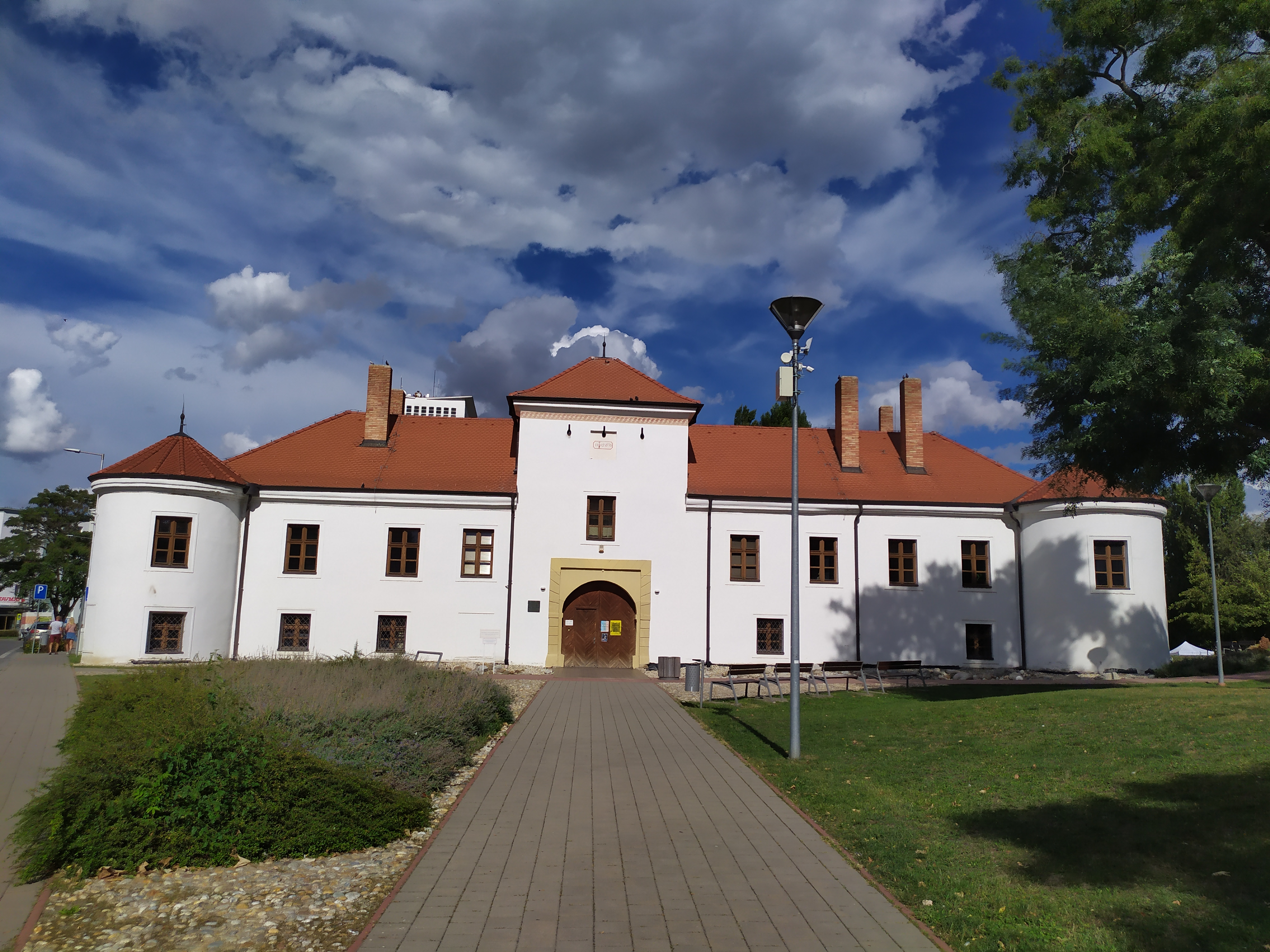
- Castle in the town

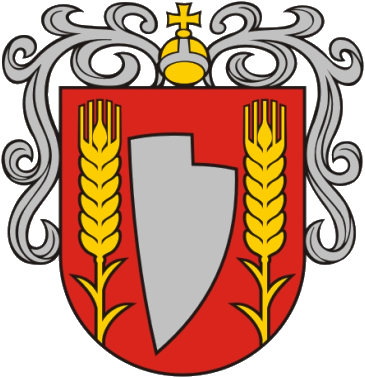
- Flag Coat of arms

- Location of Šaľa in the Nitra Region Location of Šaľa in Slovakia
- Coordinates: 48.15°N 17.88°E
- Country: Slovakia
- Region: Nitra Region
- District: Šaľa District
- First mentioned: 1002

Government
  - Mayor: Mgr. Jozef Belický

Area
  - Total: 44.96 km^{2} (17.36 sq mi)
- Elevation: 116 m (381 ft)

Population (2025)
  - Total: 19,534
- Time zone: UTC+1 (CET)
  - Summer (DST): UTC+2 (CEST)
- Postal code: 927 01
- Area code: +421 31
- Vehicle registration plate (until 2022): SA
- Website: sala.sk

Šaľa (Slovak: [ˈʃaʎa], locally [ˈʃala]; Hungarian: Vágsellye, German: Schelle) is a town in Šaľa District within Nitra Region in south-western Slovakia.

== Geography ==
The municipality lies at an altitude of 116 metres (381 ft) and covers an area of 44.96 km^{2} (17.36 sq mi) (2025).

Šaľa is located on the Danubian Lowland on both banks of the Váh River, around 65 km from Bratislava and 30 km from Nové Zámky. Besides the town itself, it also includes the settlements of Hetméň and Veča on the left and right banks of the river respectively. The town lies in the humid continental climactic zone.

== History ==
Šaľa was first mentioned in 1002 in a document of Pannonhalma Abbey. It was promoted into a market town in 1536. Šaľa was also ruled by Ottomans between 1663 and 1686 as part of Uyvar Eyalet. The railway, built in 1850 between Vienna and Budapest speeded development in Šaľa. After 1918, the town became part of Czechoslovakia, however belonging for a short time between 1938 and 1945 again to Hungary before being returned to Czechoslovakia again. Šaľa became part of Slovakia on 1 January 1993 when Czechoslovakia was formally dissolved.

== Population ==
Historical population
Year	Pop.	±%
1970	12,922	—
1980	19,167	+48.3%
1991	24,776	+29.3%
2001	24,564	−0.9%
2011	23,554	−4.1%
2021	21,183	−10.1%
Source: Censuses

Population statistic (10 years)
Year	1995	2005	2015	2025
Count	25,291	24,438	22,714	19,534
Difference		−3.37%	−7.05%	−14.00%

Population statistic
Year	2024	2025
Count	19,934	19,534
Difference		−2.00%

It has a population of 19,534 people (31 December 2025).

=== Ethnicity ===
Census 2021 (1+ %)
Ethnicity	Number	Fraction
Slovak	16,879	79.68%
Hungarian	3055	14.42%
Not found out	1539	7.26%
Total	21,183	

In year 2021 was 21,183 people by ethnicity 16,879 as Slovak, 3055 as Hungarian, 1539 as Not found out, 168 as Czech, 64 as Other, 63 as Romani, 39 as Russian, 28 as Ukrainian, 27 as Chinese, 19 as Vietnamese, 18 as Rusyn, 15 as Serbian, 15 as Polish, 10 as Turkish, 10 as Romanian, 10 as Croatian, 9 as Italian, 8 as Bulgarian, 7 as Jewish, 6 as German, 5 as Moravian, 5 as Albanian, 4 as Austrian, 3 as English, 2 as Irish, 2 as Korean, 2 as Canadian, 2 as Greek, 1 as Silesian and 1 as French.

Note on population: The difference values of population numbers in the table "Population statistic" and in the sections "Ethnicity" & "Religion" is caused by the use of various statistical methods.

=== Religion ===
Census 2021 (1+ %)
Religion	Number	Fraction
Roman Catholic Church	9975	47.09%
None	7779	36.72%
Not found out	1845	8.71%
Evangelical Church	648	3.06%
Calvinist Church	244	1.15%
Total	21,183	

In year 2021 was 21,183 people by religion 9975 from Roman Catholic Church, 7779 from None, 1845 from Not found out, 648 from Evangelical Church, 244 from Calvinist Church, 133 from Greek Catholic Church, 113 from Christian Congregations in Slovakia, 73 from Other, 68 from Ad hoc movements, 57 from Eastern Orthodox Church, 57 from Other and not ascertained christian church, 44 from Buddhism, 41 from Jehovah's Witnesses, 22 from Islam, 18 from United Methodist Church, 18 from Apostolic Church, 11 from Old Catholic Church, 10 from Jewish community, 9 from Paganism and natural spirituality, 7 from Seventh-day Adventist Church, 4 from Hinduism, 3 from Baptists Church, 2 from Czechoslovak Hussite Church, 1 from Church of the Brethren and 1 from Bahá'i Community.

== Economy ==
The economy of the town is primarily based on the chemical industry by the company Duslo Šaľa, just east of the town. Other industries include textile and construction.

== Twin towns — sister cities ==
Šaľa is twinned with:

- Końskie, Poland
- Kuhmo, Finland
- Oroszlány, Hungary
- Telč, Czech Republic
- Mohyliv-Podilskyi, Ukraine

== Notable people ==
- B-Complex, Slovak drum & bass producer and DJ; born in Šaľa

== See also ==
- FK Slovan Duslo Šaľa
