= B-Complex =

Slovak musician and DJ (born 1984)

Matia Lenická
- Also known as: B-Complex
- Born: Matúš Lenický; 9 May 1984 (age 42); Šaľa, Czechoslovakia
- Origin: Bratislava, Slovakia
- Genre: Drum and bass
- Years active: 1996–present

Matia Lenická (born 9 May 1984), also known by the stage name B-Complex, is a drum and bass producer and DJ from Bratislava, Slovakia. In 2015, she came out as bi-gender. (Note: This article follows the lead of B-Complex's SoundCloud page and other sources in using she/her pronouns.)

== Career ==
B-Complex began producing music in 1996 at the age of 12, being mainly interested in hardcore, trance, and psytrance, moving on to downtempo and hip hop. Following this period, she shifted to drum and bass, with the intention of creating a unique personal style.

The artist's first major label release was "Beautiful Lies", which appeared on the compilation Sick Music from Hospital Records. The compilation went on to reach the top 30 on the iTunes UK Download Chart, and was in the top 5 on the Beatport Drum and Bass Chart. Her first UK show was in September 2009 at Matter nightclub in London, for a Hospitality night. She started to use a female version of her name in 2015.

== Discography ==
EPs

- Shteel / Hunter (2006)
- Beautiful Lies VIP / Little Oranges (2010)
- Salad Is Ok (2010)

Singles

- "Amazon Rain" (2005)
- "Acid Trip / Squelch" (2008)
- "Tota Helpa" (2009)
- "Girl with Flower" (2009)
- "China" (2010)
- "Sober Yet Overdosed" (2010)
- "Rolling with the Punches / Reflections" with Diane Charlemagne (2012)
- "Early Bird" (2015)
- "Past Lessons for the Future" (2021)
- "Desolation / Atrc" with Reebz (2024)
- "Lorem Ipsum" with Jordana, feat. Zak Meow (2025)

Remixes

- New Education – "Arcane (B-Complex remix)" (2009)
- Shapeshifter – "Sleepless (B-Complex remix)" (2010)
- Kava Kava – "Clarity (B-Complex remix)" (2010)
- London Elektricity – "Invisible Worlds (B-Complex remix)" (2011)
- The Very Best – "Julia (B-Complex remix)" (2011)
- Vec – "Samotár (B-Complex remix)" (2015)
