= National Health Policy =

Health plan publications in India

The central government of India periodically publishes a National Health Policy (NHP) to guide future health programs.

In 1979 the Journal of the Indian Medical Association published a review of the policy. There has been 3 NHPs by Government Of India. The three NHPs are- NHP (1983), NHP (2002) and NHP (2017).

The first NHP in 1983 had as its goal access to primary care for everyone in India by the year 2000. The Indian Dental Association made oral health recommendations in 1986 the Central Council of Health and Family Welfare accepted these for inclusion in future planning.

The Ayushman Bharat is one of the implementations of the 2017 policy. The latest discussion involves the National Health ID system.
