= Rashtriya Swasthya Bima Yojana =

Government-sponsored Health Insurance Programme in India

Rashtriya Swasthya Bima Yojana (RSBY)
- Country: India
- Prime Minister(s): Dr. Manmohan Singh
- Launched: 1 April 2008; 18 years ago
- Status: Active

Rashtriya Swasthya Bima Yojana (RSBY, literally "National Health Insurance Programme",) is a government-run health insurance programme for the Indian poor. The scheme aims to provide health insurance coverage to the unrecognised sector workers belonging to the BPL category and their family members shall be beneficiaries under this scheme. It provides for cashless insurance for hospitalisation in public as well as private hospitals. The scheme started enrolling on April 1, 2008 and has been implemented in 25 states of India. A total of 36 million families have been enrolled as of February 2014. Initially, RSBY was a project under the Ministry of Labour and Employment. Now it has been transferred to Ministry of Health and Family Welfare from April 1, 2015

Every "below poverty line" (BPL) family holding a yellow ration card pays ₹30 (31¢ US) registration fee to get a biometric-enabled smart card containing their fingerprints and photographs. This enables them to receive inpatient medical care of up to ₹30,000 (US$310) per family per year in any of the empanelled hospitals. Pre-existing illnesses are covered from day one, for head of household, spouse and up to three dependent children or parents.

In the Union Budget for 2012–13, the government made a total allocation of ₹1,096.7 crore (US$110 million) towards RSBY. Although meant to cover the entire BPL population, (about 37.2 per cent of the total Indian population according to the Tendulkar committee estimates) it had enrolled only around 10 per cent of the Indian population by March 31, 2011. Also, it is expected to cost the exchequer at least ₹3,350 crore (US$350 million) a year to cover the entire BPL population.

The scheme has won plaudits from the World Bank, the UN and the ILO as one of the world's best health insurance schemes. Germany has shown interest in adopting the smart card based model for revamping its own social security system, the oldest in the world, by replacing its current, expensive, system of voucher based benefits for 2.5 million children. The Indo-German Social Security Programme, created as part of a co-operation pact between the two countries is guiding this collaboration.

One of the big changes that this scheme entails is bringing investments to unserved areas. Most private investments in healthcare in India have been focused on tertiary or specialized care in urban areas. However, with RSBY coming in, the scenario is changing. New age companies like Glocal Healthcare Systems, a company based out of Kolkata and funded by Tier I Capital Funds like Sequoia Capital and Elevar Equity are setting up State of Art Hospitals in Semi Urban - rural settings. This trend can create the infrastructure that India's healthcare system desperately needs.

As per report from Council for Social Development, it was found that this scheme has not been very effective. Increase in outpatient expenditure, hospitalization and medicines have compelled insurance companies to exclude several diseases out of their policies and thus making it not affordable for BPL families. Report also has found that most of the beneficiaries are from higher classes and not targeted beneficiaries.

In 2018-19, RSBY was subsumed into India's Ayushman Bharat - Pradhan Mantri Jan Aarogya Yojana (PMJAY). Consequently it no longer exists as a standalone programme (January 2026).

== See also ==
- Health Care Access Among Dalits in India
