= Porter =

Porter may refer to:

== Companies ==
- Porter Airlines, Canadian airline based in Toronto
- Porter Chemical Company, a defunct U.S. toy manufacturer of chemistry sets
- Porter Motor Company, defunct U.S. car manufacturer
- H.K. Porter, Inc., a locomotive manufacturer
- Porter (company), Indian on-demand logistics company

== People ==
- Porter (name), an English surname and given name (including a list of persons with the name)

== Occupations ==
- Porter (carrier), a person who carries objects
- Porter (college), a member of staff in many of the colleges of the Universities of Cambridge, Durham, Lancaster, Oxford and York
- Porter (railroad), a railroad employee who assists passengers at stations
- Porter (monastery), the monk appointed to be the one who interacts with the public
- Pullman porter, a railroad employee who assists passengers on sleeping cars
- Deal porter, a dockworker specializing in handling baulks of softwood
- Doorman (profession), American English for the occupation known in British English as porter
- Groom Porter, official in charge of gambling in the Tudor court; the owner or operator of a gaming hall
- Hospital porter, an assistant in a hospital
- Kitchen porter, a plongeur or marmiton, position in the Brigade de cuisine of a commercial kitchen
- Ostiarius, formerly known as doorkeeper or porter, one of the minor orders of the Roman Catholic ministry
- Bar-back, sometimes known as porter, a bartender's assistant

== Places ==
=== United Kingdom ===
- Porter Brook, river in Sheffield, England
- The Little Don River also known as the Porter, a tributary of the River Don in South Yorkshire, England

=== United States ===
- Malone-Porter, Washington
- Porter, Indiana
- Porter, Maine
- Porter, Minnesota
- Porter, Missouri
- Porter, New York
- Porter, Ohio
- Porter, Oklahoma
- Porter, Texas
- Porter, West Virginia
- Porter, Wisconsin, a town
- Porter County, Indiana
- Porter Heights, Texas
- Porter's Mills, Wisconsin, a ghost town
- Porter Square, in Cambridge, Massachusetts
  - Porter (MBTA station), at that square
- Porter Township, Michigan (disambiguation) (three places)
- Porter Township, Pennsylvania (disambiguation) (seven places)

=== Space ===
- Porter (lunar crater)
- Porter (Martian crater)

== Vehicles ==
- Hyundai Porter, a pickup truck
- Mazda Porter, a series of small trucks
- Piaggio Porter, electric van
- Pilatus PC-6 Porter, Swiss aircraft
- Porter Gyropachute, a 1910s VTOL aircraft

== Other uses ==
- Porter (band), a Mexican indie band
- Porter (beer), a type of beer
- Porter (magazine), a fashion publication
- The Porter (horse), an American Thoroughbred racehorse and leading sire
- The Porter (TV series), a Canadian television series that debuted in 2022
- Porter College, a residential college at the University of California, Santa Cruz
- Porter, a character in the Thomas and Friends TV series
- Porter, a character in the play Macbeth
- ]]Gus Porter]], a character in the Disney Channel animated series The Owl House

== See also ==
- Port (disambiguation)
- Miss Porter's School, also known as Porter's, a school in Connecticut, United States
- Porter's Regiment, American Revolutionary War soldiers under Colonel Porter
- Porters (disambiguation)
