= POPxo =

- Website type: Digital media platform
- Available in: English, Hindi
- Founded: 2014
- Headquarters: Mumbai, Maharashtra, {{{location_country}}}
- Country of origin: India
- Founder: Priyanka Gill
- Key people: Priyanka Gill, CEO, Good Media Co & Group Co-founder, Good Glamm Group
- Parent: Good Glamm Group; Good Media Co
- Website: www.popxo.com
- Commercial: Yes
- Registration: No
- Launched: March 2014

POPxo is a digital media platform based in Gurugram, India, that focuses on women's lifestyles and entertainment. Covering topics such as fashion, beauty, health, and relationships, POPxo is part of the Good Media Co, the media division of the Good Glamm Group. POPxo is frequently cited by news outlets such as Asianet News.

As of 2023, the platform has 88 million users.

== History ==
In 2012, Priyanka Gill started eStylista, a fashion blog. This eventually evolved into an online platform for Indian women, known as POPxo. It focuses content related to fashion, entertainment, relationships, and lifestyle. By March 2014, it had reported 50,000 visitors, and in November 2014, the platform raised ₹3 crores in a pre-Series A funding round, followed by a $2 million Series A investment from IDG Ventures, Kalaari Capital, and 500 startups. In 2017, the platform was bolstered with a $3.1 million and $5.5 million round of funding from Neoplux and OPPO, respectively. This same year, POPxo was also named in Unilever Foundry30 Southeast Asia and Australasia (SEAA). In 2017, POPxo launched Plixxo, an influencer marketing platform. The company ventured into e-commerce in 2018, selling private-label merchandise. In 2019, the company opened its first outlet in Delhi.

In August 2020, MyGlamm, a Mumbai-based beauty brand merged with POPxo & Plixxo which commenced the content-to-commerce journey of the Good Glamm Group, In September 2021, MyGlamm, POPxo, and BabyChakra came together to form the Good Glamm Group, with Priyanka Gill as a Group Co-founder alongside Darpan Sanghvi and Naiyya Saggi. In October 2021, POPxo launched the POPxo by MyGlamm makeup collection entering the beauty segment with 13 makeup kits. In July 2022, POPxo launched a line of suncare products accompanied by a digital campaign called #EkDoTeenApplyPOPxoSunscreen, launching 6 sun care products.

POPxo is a part of Good Media Co (GMC), one of the largest digital media companies in India. Good Media Co manages various platforms including ScoopWhoop, MissMalini and Tweak India. In 2023, GMC had 250M monthly users and 3B monthly engagements.

== Content ==
POPxo owns and runs two digital properties to publish its content: POPxo.com and POPxo Hindi.

== Initiatives ==
=== POPxo Women Who Win ===
In November 2020, POPxo launched its intellectual property (IP) called POPxo Women Who Win. This initiative recognizes women from diverse industries and showcases their accomplishments in their respective fields. Among the featured women are include Vani Kola, Kanika Tekriwal, Namita Thapar, Masoom Minawala, Dolly Singh, Pernia Qureshi, and Yasmin Karachiwala.

=== POPxo Power Women List ===
In March 2021, POPxo launched its inaugural POPxo Power Women List on International Women's Day. This yearly compilation acknowledges Indian women from diverse domains who have made significant contributions. During COVID-19 pandemic, POPxo also donated 2,000 Wipeout Sanitizing Kits and 2000 masks to non-profit organizations. Since then, two more editions of the list have been launched, featuring individuals such as Priyanka Chopra, Deepika Padukone, Falguni Nayar, Faye D'Souza, Pooja Dhingra, Namrata Zakaria, Vani Kola, Gita Gopinath and more.

== Funding ==
POPxo has raised close to Rs 83 crore ($12.4 million) across seven rounds of funding. This includes a Rs 3 crore ($500,000) investment from a group of investors such as Google India's Rajan Anandan and CaratLane's Mithun Sancheti.

In 2017, POPxo raised a Series C round of $3.1 million, which was led by existing investors Kalaari Capital and IDG Ventures India, with participation from Japan's GREE Ventures, Summit Media (Philippines), Atul Goel, and Gurpreet Singh.

In 2018, the company raised $5.5 million (INR 37 crore) in a Series C round led by Neoplux and OPPO, with IDG Ventures India, Kalaari Capital, GREE Ventures (Japan), and Summit Media also investing in the round.
