= Food Safety and Standards Authority of India =

Statutory body in India

- भारतीय खाद्य सुरक्षा एवं मानक प्राधिकरण

Regulatory authority overview
- Formed: 5 September 2008; 18 years ago
- Jurisdiction: India
- Headquarters: New Delhi; 28.6326608°N 77.2352829°E
- Regulatory authority executives: Ms. Punya Salila Srivastava, Chairperson; Rajit Punhani, Chief executive officer
- Parent Regulatory authority: Ministry of Health & Family Welfare, Government of India
- Website: www.fssai.gov.in

The Food Safety and Standards Authority of India (FSSAI) is a statutory body under the administration of the Ministry of Health and Family Welfare, Government of India. It regulates the manufacture, storage, distribution, sale, and import of food articles, while also establishing standards to ensure food safety. The FSSAI was established by the Food Safety and Standards Act, 2006, which consolidated all former acts and orders related to food safety that were previously handled by various ministries and departments.

The FSSAI has its headquarters at New Delhi. The authority also has four regional offices located in Delhi, Mumbai, Kolkata, and Chennai. There are 22 referral laboratories notified by FSSAI, 72 State/UT laboratories located throughout India and 112 laboratories are NABL accredited private laboratories notified by FSSAI. The FSSAI is headed by a non-executive chairperson, appointed by the central government, either holding or has held the position of not below the rank of Secretary to the Government of India. Ms. Punya Salila Srivastava is the current chairperson for FSSAI and Rajit Punhani is the current chief executive officer for FSSAI. The FSSAI provisions are enforced by Food Safety Officers.

In 2021, with the aim of benefitting industries involved in manufacturing, handling, packaging and selling of food items, FSSAI decided to grant perpetual licenses to restaurants and food manufacturers on the condition that they file their returns every year. Food Safety and Standards Authority of India License or Registration is required for any food business in India that manufactures, stores, transports, or distributes food. Depending on the size and nature of the company, FSSAI registration or license may be required.

== Organizational structure ==
- Ministry of Health and Family Welfare, Government of India
  - Food Safety and Standards Authority of India
    - Chairperson
    - Chief Executive Officer, FSSAI
      - Administration Division
      - Human Resource Division
      - Finance and Accounts Division
      - Legal Division
      - Information Technology Division
    - Scientific Committee
      - Panel on Food Additives, Flavourings, Processing Aids and Materials in Contact with Food
      - Panel on Contaminants in the Food Chain
      - Panel on Biological Hazards
      - Panel on Pesticide Residues
      - Panel on Genetically Modified Organisms and Foods
      - Panel on Labelling and Claims
    - Central Advisory Committee
    - Standards Division
    - Regulatory Compliance Division
    - Food Import Division
    - Enforcement Division
    - Quality Assurance Division
    - Training and Capacity Building Division
    - State Food Safety Authorities

== History ==
FSSAI was established on 5 September 2008 under Food Safety and Standards Act, 2006 which was operationalized in year 2006. The FSSAI consists of a chairperson and 22 members. The FSSAI is responsible for setting standards for food so that there is one body to deal with and no confusion in the minds of consumers, traders, manufacturers, and investors. Ministry of Health & Family Welfare, Government of India is the Administrative Ministry of Food Safety and Standards Authority of India. The following are the statutory powers that the FSS Act, 2006 gives to the Food Safety and Standards Authority of India (FSSAI).

1. Framing of regulations to lay down food safety standards
2. Laying down guidelines for accreditation of laboratories for food testing
3. Providing scientific advice and technical support to the Central Government
4. Contributing to the development of international technical standards in food
5. Collecting and collating data regarding food consumption, contamination, emerging risks, etc.
6. Disseminating information and promoting awareness about food safety and nutrition in India.

== Location ==
FSSAI is located in 4 regions

1. Northern Region – With regional office at Ghaziabad.
2. Eastern Region - With regional office at Kolkata
3. Western region - With regional office at Mumbai
4. Southern Region - With regional office at Chennai

== Regulatory framework ==
The Food Safety and Standards Authority of India is a statutory body under Food Safety and Standards Act, 2006. The Food Safety and Standards Act (FSS), 2006 is the primary law for the regulation of food products. This act also sets up the formulation and enforcement of food safety standards in India. The FSSAI appoints food safety authorities on the state level.

The FSSAI functions under the administrative control of the Ministry of Health and Family Welfare. The main aim of FSSAI is to

1. Lay down science-based standards for articles on food
2. To regulate the manufacture, storage, distribution, import, and sale of food
3. To facilitate the safety of food

The FSS Act is a bucket for all the older laws, rules and regulations for food safety. The FSS Act took 7 older acts into one umbrella.

1. Prevention of Food Adulteration Act, 1954
2. Fruit Products Order, 1955
3. Meat Food Products Order, 1973
4. Vegetable Oil Products (Control) Order, 1947
5. Edible Oils Packaging (Regulation) Order 1998
6. Solvent Extracted Oil, De- Oiled Meal and Edible Flour (Control) Order, 1967
7. Milk and Milk Products Order, 1992.

Departments

1. Science & standards division (I & II)
2. Regulations division
3. Quality assurance division (I & II)
4. Regulatory compliance division
5. Human resource & finance division
6. General administration and policy coordination division
7. Information technology division
8. Social and behavioural change division
9. Trade and international cooperation division
10. Training division
11. Rajbhasha

== Research and quality assurance ==
=== Research ===
FSSAI has set certain guidelines for food safety research. The Research and Development division is responsible for research with the following objectives:

1. Generate new knowledge that would help in continuously updating and upgrading food safety standards that are compatible with international organizations
2. Carry out evidence-based studies for improving or building Rules and regulations.

=== Quality Assurance ===
FSSAI has been mandated to perform various functions related to the quality and standards of food and drinks . These functions in addition to others include "Laying down procedure and guidelines for notification of the accredited laboratories as per ISO17025." The FSSAI notified laboratories that are classified as:

1. FSSAI Notified NABL Accredited Labs - 112
2. State Labs - 72
3. Referral Labs - 22

== Standards ==
Standards framed by FSSAI are prescribed under Food Safety and Standards (Food Product Standards and Food Additives) Regulation, 2011, Food Safety and Standards (Packaging and Labelling) Regulation, 2011 and Food Safety and Standards (Contaminants, Toxins, and Residues) Regulations, 2011.

The FSSAI has prescribed standards for the following:

- Dairy products and analogues
- Fats, oils and fat emulsions
- ALL Packed product
- Fruits and vegetable products
- Cereal and cereal products
- Meat and meat products
- Fish and fish products
- Sweets & confectionery
- Sweetening agents including honey
- Salt, spices, condiments and related products
- Beverages, (other than dairy and fruits & vegetables based)
- Other food product and ingredients
- Proprietary food
- Irradiation of food
- Fortification of staple foods i.e. vegetable oil, milk, salt, rice and wheat flour/maida
- Health Supplements/ Nutraceuticals

The development of standards is a dynamic process based on the latest developments in food science, food consumption pattern, new food products, and additives, changes in the processing technology leading to changed specifications, advancements in food analytical methods, and identification of new risks or other regulatory options.

Formulation of standards of any article of food under the Food Safety and Standards Act 2006, involves several stages. After consideration by the Food Authority, the draft standard is published (Draft notified), for inviting stakeholder comments. Since India is a signatory to the WTO-SPS Committee, Draft Standard is also notified in WTO. Thereafter, taking into account the comments received from the stakeholders, the Standard is finalized and notified in the Gazette of India, and implemented.

=== Front-of-pack nutrition labelling ===
In response to a Supreme Court order dated 10 September 2026 in a case concerning front-of-pack nutrition labelling (FoPL), FSSAI filed a compliance affidavit proposing a single-phase rollout of warning labels for packaged foods exceeding prescribed thresholds for fat, sugar and salt. Under the proposal, qualifying products would carry a red hexagon on a white square background positioned at the top left of the front of the pack, while any product containing artificial sweeteners would be required to carry the statement "contain non caloric sweetener" on the front of the pack instead of the back panel.

FSSAI stated it would finalise the labelling regulations within about four months, after which manufacturers would have a voluntary implementation period of 365 days before the stricter labelling became mandatory, a transition intended to allow use of existing stocks of printed packaging material. The matter was listed before the Supreme Court for further hearing on 28 September 2026.

=== Analogue paneer labelling ===
On 22 September 2026, FSSAI notified a draft amendment to the Food Safety and Standards (Prohibition and Restrictions on Sales) Regulations, 2011, that would restrict the use of the word "paneer" for products made from ingredients not derived from milk. The Food Safety and Standards (Prohibition and Restrictions on Sales) Amendment Regulations, 2026 would insert a new clause under Regulation 2.1.1 covering "paneer made of constituents not derived from milk". Products already licensed or registered under the "analogue in dairy context" category would have to stop using the term "paneer" in their names, labelling and marketing.

FSSAI invited objections and suggestions from stakeholders and the public, and the draft is to be considered after 60 days from the date the notification is made available to the public.

== Enforcement ==
Food Safety Officers are responsible for enforcing and executing the provisions of the Food Safety and Standards Act, 2006 within their designated areas. The Commissioner of Food Safety and Designated Officer have the authority to exercise the same powers as Food Safety Officers.

Food Safety Officers possess the right to enter and inspect any place where food articles are manufactured, stored, or exhibited for commercial purposes. They are authorized to collect samples for analysis by a Food Analyst. The authority of a Food Safety Officer to enter and inspect premises is equal to that of a police officer equipped with a search warrant under the Code of Criminal Procedure (CrPC). They can issue registrations to food business operators.

== Consumer outreach ==
Consumers can connect to FSSAI through various channels. A GAMA portal for concerns regarding misleading claims and advertisements too is operated.

== Applicable FSSAI License ==
FSSAI issues three types of license based on the nature of the food business and turnover:

- Registration: For Turnover less than ₹1.5 Crore
- State License: For Turnover between ₹1.5 Crore to ₹50 Crore
- Central License: For Turnover above ₹50Crore
- Ecommerce License: For Online Seller

Other criteria like the location of the business, number of retail stores, etc. are needed while evaluating the nature of the license application.

== Projects ==
In 2009 the FSSAI instigated a pilot project Safe Food, Tasty Food to improve the safety and quality of food being served at restaurants and other outlets, implementing agencies being local municipal authorities and industry associations (FICCI, CII, AIFPA and NRAI).

=== State Food Safety Index (SFSI) ===
The State Food Safety Index (SFSI), was developed in 2018 in collaboration with the FSSAI. The SFSI was created to motivate the States and Union Territories to improve their performance and work towards establishing an appropriate food safety ecosystem.

== Reception ==
According to a survey conducted over 24,000 people across 293 districts of India, 73% of the 12,308 responses indicated little to no confidence in the effectiveness of agencies such as FSSAI and state food regulators in ensuring food safety. The need for stricter regulation of eateries was highlighted by Prof Edmond Fernandes, Director, Edward & Cynthia Institute of Public Health, citing kitchen safety, food additives, climate change and hygiene standards and irregular visits by food inspectors.

== Controversies ==
=== Quashing of product approval procedure (2015) ===
In August 2015, the Supreme Court of India upheld a Bombay High Court order that quashed a central advisory issued by the FSSAI regarding its product approval procedure. Prior to this ruling, the FSSAI required food companies to seek regulatory approvals for new products through executive advisories rather than parliamentary regulations. The courts ruled that the FSSAI lacked the statutory power to mandate such approvals without framing formal regulations under Section 92 of the Food Safety and Standards Act. Following the Supreme Court's dismissal of the FSSAI's appeal, the regulator was forced to temporarily scrap its product approval process, which industry bodies had criticized as arbitrary and a hindrance to innovation.

=== Maggi noodles ban (2015) ===
In June 2015, the FSSAI ordered a nationwide recall and ban on all nine variants of Nestlé's Maggi instant noodles, alleging that the product contained excessive levels of lead and mislabelled monosodium glutamate (MSG). Nestlé challenged the nationwide ban in the Bombay High Court. In August 2015, the High Court struck down the FSSAI's ban, ruling that the regulatory body had violated the principles of natural justice by failing to provide the company with a proper hearing before issuing the recall. Furthermore, the court noted that the laboratories utilized by the FSSAI to test the noodle samples were not accredited by the National Accreditation Board for Testing and Calibration Laboratories (NABL) for those specific tests.

=== CAG audit report findings (2017) ===
In December 2017, the Comptroller and Auditor General of India (CAG) tabled a comprehensive performance audit on the implementation of the Food Safety and Standards Act (Report No. 37 of 2017). The audit highlighted severe systemic and administrative failures within the FSSAI. The CAG found that the authority lacked a documented policy on risk-based inspections and had no functional database on food businesses operating in the country. The report revealed a critical shortage of qualified manpower; out of 16 state food laboratories test-checked by the CAG, 15 did not have qualified food analysts, and 65 out of 72 state laboratories lacked NABL accreditation. The CAG also criticized the FSSAI for failing to ensure that customs authorities took appropriate action on non-conformance reports to prevent unsafe food imports from entering India.

=== Front-of-pack labelling delays ===
Public health experts and parliamentary panels have heavily criticized the FSSAI for prolonged delays in finalizing and implementing a Front-of-Pack Nutrition Labelling (FOPL) system for packaged foods. Draft norms were initially issued in September 2022 to introduce visual warning labels (indicating high fat, sugar, and salt content) to combat rising obesity and diet-related non-communicable diseases. However, the regulations faced significant pushback and lobbying from the ultra-processed food industry. In 2026, the Parliamentary Standing Committee on Consumer Affairs formally expressed dismay over the years-long regulatory standstill, urging the FSSAI to fast-track interpretative warning labels to empower consumers, noting that current back-of-pack numerical disclosures fail to alter purchasing behavior.

=== Misleading "health drink" claims ===
The FSSAI has faced scrutiny over regulatory lags regarding misleading marketing by beverage brands marketed towards children. Following a 2023 public controversy regarding the high sugar content in Mondelez India's Bournvita, the Ministry of Commerce and Industry intervened in April 2024, directing e-commerce platforms to de-list dairy, cereal, and malt-based beverage mixes from their "Health Drink" or "Energy Drink" categories. The directive highlighted that FSSAI regulations lacked a standardized, legal definition for a "health drink." Consequently, the FSSAI stepped up crackdowns on misleading claims, eventually forcing manufacturers like Mondelez and Amway to withdraw unsubstantiated health and nutrient-comparison claims from their packaging and online advertising.

=== Spice contamination and pesticide limits (2024) ===
In early 2024, food safety regulators in Hong Kong and Singapore recalled specific batches of Indian spice brands MDH and Everest, citing the presence of ethylene oxide, a known carcinogen used as a fumigant. Amid this international scrutiny, media reports and activists alleged that the FSSAI had simultaneously and quietly raised the Maximum Residue Limit (MRL) for pesticides in herbs and spices tenfold, from 0.01 mg/kg to 0.1 mg/kg. The FSSAI issued a clarification refuting the characterization, stating that the default limit of 0.1 mg/kg was only applicable to pesticides not officially registered with the Ministry of Agriculture, a move they argued aligned with international Codex Alimentarius standards. Following extensive testing of domestic samples in accredited laboratories, the FSSAI later announced that it found no traces of ethylene oxide in the domestic products of the implicated spice brands.
