= Porter Township, Pennsylvania =

Porter Township is the name of some places in the U.S. state of Pennsylvania:

- Porter Township, Clarion County, Pennsylvania
- Porter Township, Clinton County, Pennsylvania
- Porter Township, Huntingdon County, Pennsylvania
- Porter Township, Jefferson County, Pennsylvania
- Porter Township, Lycoming County, Pennsylvania
- Porter Township, Pike County, Pennsylvania
- Porter Township, Schuylkill County, Pennsylvania
