= Porter Township =

Porter Township may refer to:

== Arkansas ==
- Porter Township, Crawford County, Arkansas, in Crawford County, Arkansas

== Indiana ==
- Porter Township, Porter County, Indiana

== Michigan ==
- Porter Township, Cass County, Michigan
- Porter Township, Midland County, Michigan
- Porter Township, Van Buren County, Michigan

== North Dakota ==
- Porter Township, Dickey County, North Dakota

== Ohio ==
- Porter Township, Delaware County, Ohio
- Porter Township, Scioto County, Ohio

== Pennsylvania ==
- Porter Township, Clarion County, Pennsylvania
- Porter Township, Clinton County, Pennsylvania
- Porter Township, Huntingdon County, Pennsylvania
- Porter Township, Jefferson County, Pennsylvania
- Porter Township, Lycoming County, Pennsylvania
- Porter Township, Pike County, Pennsylvania
- Porter Township, Schuylkill County, Pennsylvania
