= Darpan Sanghvi =

Indian entrepreneur

- Born: Mumbai, India
- Education: Maharashtra Institute of Technology, Pune
- Alma mater: ESADE Business School; University of Texas at Austin
- Occupations: Entrepreneur; mentor
- Organization(s): Founder & CEO, CoFounder Circle; Founder of MyGlamm; Co-founder and former CEO of Good Glamm Group

Darpan Sanghvi is an entrepreneur and mentor. He is the founder of CoFounder Circle, an acceleration and venture studio platform that supports startups. He previously founded the beauty brand MyGlamm and co-founded the Good Glamm Group, where he served as group chief executive officer until 2025. Sanghvi has been noted in Indian business media for introducing and advancing the content-to-commerce model in the country's beauty and personal care industry. In 2025, he publicly pledged to compensate stakeholders following the dissolution of the Good Glamm Group.

== Early life and education ==
Sanghvi grew up in Mumbai and Pune, India. He studied engineering at the Maharashtra Institute of Technology in Pune. During his studies, he worked at Baazee.com (later acquired by eBay). He later pursued a dual degree MBA from ESADE Business School in Barcelona and the University of Texas at Austin.

== Career ==
=== MyGlamm (2015–2020) ===
In 2015, Sanghvi founded MyGlamm as an on-demand beauty service. Two years later, the company shifted to a direct-to-consumer cosmetics model and launched a makeup line in collaboration with fashion designer Manish Malhotra. By 2019, the brand had gained visibility in India's online beauty retail market.

=== Formation of Good Glamm Group (2020–2021) ===
Between 2020 and 2021, MyGlamm acquired the digital media platform POPxo, the influencer network Plixxo, and the parenting site BabyChakra. These acquisitions were consolidated under the Good Glamm Group in October 2021. The group was valued at US$1.2 billion the following month after raising US$150 million from investors, including Warburg Pincus, L’Occitane, Amazon, Prosus, Accel, and Bessemer Venture Partners.

From 2021 to 2022, the group expanded through the acquisitions of ScoopWhoop, Sirona, The Moms Co., St Botanica, Organic Harvest, and MissMalini. It also entered into promotional partnerships with Indian film actors and media personalities. In April 2024, the Good Glamm Group entered into a joint venture with Serena Williams to launch Wyn Beauty in the United States, distributed through Ulta Beauty stores.

=== CoFounder Circle ===
Following the collapse of the Good Glamm Group in July 2025, Sanghvi founded CoFounder Circle, a startup platform that uses AI to support early-stage companies.

=== Pitch To Get Rich ===
Sanghvi appears as a judge and mentor on the fashion-entrepreneur reality series Pitch To Get Rich, which airs on JioHotstar. The show is hosted by Karan Johar and has Manish Malhotra, Malaika Arora, Akshay Kumar, Saif Ali Khan, Ananya Panday, Sara Ali Khan as judges on the show. It is produced by Dharma Productions and created by the Fashion Entrepreneur Fund.

== Financial challenges and dissolution ==
Beginning in early 2024, the group faced financial strain linked to its rapid expansion strategy. In July 2025, lenders initiated brand-by-brand asset sales, resulting in the group's dissolution. Around the same period, Sanghvi published an essay titled The Momentum Trap, in which he reflected on the company's growth model and described it as "too much, too fast, too big." Analysts and business publications noted the challenges the company faced in integrating multiple acquisitions.

=== Restitution initiative ===
In July 2025, Sanghvi announced that he would allocate a portion of his future post-tax earnings to compensate former employees and pledged to make whole vendors, lenders, and equity shareholders of Good Glamm through a "Good Glamm Restitution Fund," which would receive equity allocations from his next venture. Media reports described the pledge as an uncommon move among startup founders in India.
