= Porters =

Porters may refer to:

- Porters, Virginia, an unincorporated community in Virginia, United States
- Porters, Wisconsin, an unincorporated community in Wisconsin, United States
- Porters Ski Area, a ski resort in New Zealand
- Porters (TV series), a British TV series
- Porters (1988 TV series), a New Zealand TV series

== See also ==
- Miss Porter's School, also known as Porter's, a school in Connecticut, United States
- Porter (disambiguation)
