= Porter Township, Michigan =

Porter Township is the name of some places in the U.S. state of Michigan:

- Porter Township, Cass County, Michigan
- Porter Township, Midland County, Michigan
- Porter Township, Van Buren County, Michigan

== See also ==
- Porter Township (disambiguation)
