= Good Glamm Group =

Beauty conglomerate

- Type: Privately held company
- Industry: Cosmetics & personal care, media, influencers
- Founded: September 2021
- Area served: Asia, Middle East
- Key people: Darpan Sanghvi (Group founder & CEO); Priyanka Gill (Co-founder); Naiyya Saggi (Co-founder)
- Revenue: ▲₹252.7 crore (US$26 million) (FY22)
- Net income: ▼₹−273 crore (US$−28 million) (FY22)

The Good Glamm Group is a content-to-commerce company that produces and sells personal care and cosmetic products, with operations in India, Dubai, Singapore, and the USA. The company achieved unicorn status in 2021 after a $150 million Series D funding round at a valuation of $1.2 billion. The group announced plans to launch an IPO on 30 August 2022.

== Background ==
Meanwhile, in 2013, Priyanka Gill founded POPxo, a digital community platform for millennial women that later launched its e-commerce division selling POPxo beauty products. In 2020, Sanghvi teamed up with Gill and purchased POPxo for an undisclosed sum. MyGlamm then went on to acquire BabyChakra, a content and community platform for young mothers set up in August 2021 by Naiyya Saggi.

In July 2021, MyGlamm secured 530 INR crore in a Series C funding round with Accel and existing investors in July. In September, the merger of all three companies, MyGlamm, POPxo, and BabyChakra, formed of the Good Glamm Group.

In November, the Good Glamm Group became India's first beauty commerce unicorn after receiving 150 million USD in a Series D funding round led by Prosus Ventures and Warburg Pincus. Investors include L'Occitane, Bessemer Venture Partners, Amazon, Ascent Capital, Warburg Pincus, and others.

By July 2022, the Good Glamm Group had acquired 11 companies and raised 250 million USD in digital media, influencer marketing, and beauty & personal care brands. On 12 December 2023, the Good Glamm Group became a direct seller on Open Network for Digital Commerce (ONDC).

In April 2024, the group expanded its operations to the United States through a joint venture with tennis player Serena Williams and launched the brand Wyn Beauty by Serena Williams. It also partnered with production house Dharma Productions, and Pooja Entertainment to become the beauty partner for the Bollywood film Bade Miyan Chote Miyan.

== Financials ==
In 2020–21, the group recorded consolidated revenue from operations at over Rs 49 crore along with a net loss of Rs 43.6 crore, while it registered a loss of Rs 272.9 crore in the financial year 2022–23. Its current revenue run rate is $41 million.

== Business divisions ==
The Good Glamm Group has four divisions: Good Brands Co, Good Media Co, Good Creator Co, and Good Community. Good Brands Co includes brands like MyGlamm, The Moms Co, Sirona, St. Botanica, and Organic Harvest. Good Media Co includes digital media companies like POPxo, ScoopWhoop, Tweak, MissMalini, and BabyChakra. Good Creator Co includes influencer companies like Plixxo, Winkl, Vidooly, Bulbul, and MissMalini's influencer and talent management division and launched the Good Creator Co (GCC) App in March 2023.

== Accolades ==
The Good Glamm Group has won several awards including five at Forbes DTC Awards in 2023, featured in Fortune's Employer of the Future list, LinkedIn's top 10 Startups, and Beauty Matters List of future 50 beauty companies in 2023. Harvard Business School did a case study on the acquisition of BabyChakra and their brands won awards from Vogue and Cosmopolitan.

== CSR activities ==
Good Glamm Group, through its subsidiaries, works on various social initiatives to address societal challenges. These initiatives cover different sectors and regions.

=== Sirona Hygiene Foundation ===
The Sirona Hygiene Foundation, the social responsibility arm of Sirona, an FMCG brand owned by the Good Glamm Group, works to reduce period poverty and promote gender equality. It conducts educational programs across rural areas in India and distributes menstrual cups. In 2023, the foundation partnered with a Uttarakhand-based DivIn Pro to launch a menstrual cup awareness campaign for 3,100 individuals in the region. These sessions were conducted for women and healthcare workers across 25 villages and 3 districts in Uttarakhand through partnerships with various organizations, including the Uttarakhand Police Wives Welfare Association, the University of Petroleum and Energy Studies in Dehradun, the Department of Women Empowerment and Child Development in Uttarkashi, and the Mount Valley Development Association in Tehri. The initiative is part of Project Lakhon Khwahishen, which has educated over 100,000 girls on menstrual hygiene.

=== The Moms. Co. Mompreneur Show ===
In 2023, The Moms Co., a subsidiary of the Good Glamm Group, launched its first reality show, The Mompreneurs Show. The show provides mentoring and a platform to help mom micro-entrepreneurs grow their businesses.

=== Project Naveli ===
In 2022, the group partnered with Project Naveli and Workverse to launch the second cohort of the Nimaya program. This initiative helps girls from underserved backgrounds by providing skills training, mentorship, and career guidance.

=== BabyChakra x Cry ===
In October 2022, BabyChakra, part of the Good Glamm Group, teamed up with CRY, an NGO for underserved children, for the Ek Tyohaar Aisa Bhi – Jahan Sapno Ko Milein Pankh campaign. On Children's Day, BabyChakra and The Moms Co. launched #MomsTalk, a community for mothers to connect and share experiences while supporting CRY kids.

In December 2022, BabyChakra and The Moms Co. released the second edition of the ChangeMakers list. This list honored ten inspiring women including Masoom Minawala Mehta, Meeta Sharma Gupta, Chaitra Chidanand, Susmitha Lakkakula, Faye D'Souza, Dia Mirza Rekhi, Alia Bhatt, Neha Dhupia, and Sonali Bendre Behl for their contributions.

=== Label Padho Moms ===
In 2022, BabyChakra launched the #LabelPadhoMoms campaign, which involved over 8,000 mothers and 2,000 doctors. The campaign aimed to raise awareness among parents about harmful ingredients in baby products. BabyChakra also released a list of toxins commonly found in baby products.
