= Dunzo =

Indian delivery service company

Dunzo Digital Private Limited
- Company type: Private
- Available in: English
- Founded: July 2014; 12 years ago
- Dissolved: January 14, 2025
- Headquarters: Indiranagar, Bengaluru, Karnataka, India
- Area served: Bengaluru; Delhi; Gurugram; Pune; Hyderabad; Chennai; Mumbai
- Founders: Kabeer Biswas; Ankur Agarwal; Dalvir Suri; Mukund Jha
- Services: Package pickup and drop; Online restaurant discovery; Grocery delivery; Bike taxi; Laundry delivery; Medicine delivery; Local couriers
- Revenue: ▲₹227 crore (US$24 million) (FY23)
- Net income: ▲₹−1,802 crore (US$−190 million) (FY23)
- Website: dunzo.com
- Registration: Optional
- Current status: Offline
- Native clients on: Windows Phone, iOS, Android, Universal Windows Platform (Windows 10 Mobile, Windows 10)

Dunzo was an Indian e-commerce company that delivered fruits and vegetables, meat, pet supplies, food, and medicines in major cities. It also had a separate service to pick up and deliver packages within the same city. Dunzo provided its delivery services in eight Indian cities including Bengaluru, Delhi, Gurugram, Pune, Chennai, Jaipur, Mumbai and Hyderabad. The company operated a bike taxi service in Gurgaon. Dunzo was headquartered in Bangalore and was founded in 2014 by Kabeer Biswas along with co-founders Ankur Agarwal, Dalvir Suri and Mukund Jha. Services were shut down in January 2025.

== History ==
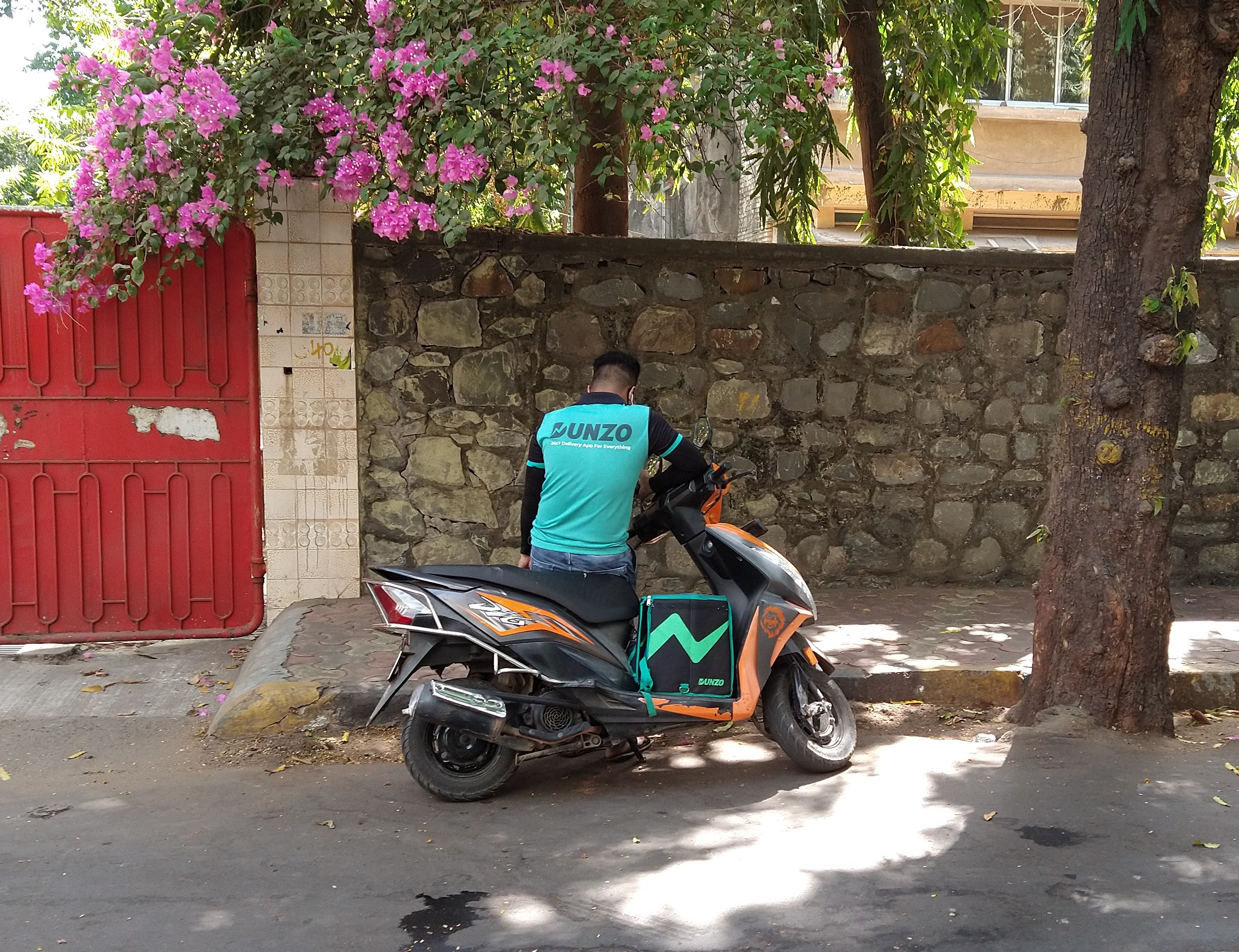
A Dunzo delivery partner waiting at Four Bungalows, Andheri in Mumbai

Dunzo was founded in July 2014 by Kabeer Biswas, an alumnus of the NMIMS, University of Mumbai. Before Dunzo, Kabeer founded a company called Hoppr, which was acquired by Hike Messenger in 2014. Dunzo started out as a small WhatsApp group, and transformed into a hyperlocal, app-based service.

Dunzo raised its first round of funding of US$650k in March 2016 from Blume Ventures, Aspada Ventures, accompanied by other investors including, Rajan Anandan, MD of Google India and Sandipan Chattopaday.

In December 2017, Dunzo received US$12 million in a fresh round from Google, with existing investors, Blume Ventures and Aspada participating in the round. This was Google's first direct investment in a startup in India.

In June 2019, Dunzo suffered a data breach which exposed the user data of approximately 3.5 million users including email addresses, names, phone numbers and IP addresses.

On 29 August 2019, Dunzo raised ₹34.56 crore funding by issuing debentures as well as Series C1 preference shares to existing investor Alteria Capital.

In May 2020, Dunzo partnered with FMCG major PepsiCo to deliver its snacks brands such as Lay's and Kurkure to customers' doorsteps in Bengaluru amid the lockdown due to the COVID-19 pandemic in India in keeping with PepsiCo's ‘Direct-to-Customer' initiative. In the same month, it also partnered with digital payments app Google Pay to provide grocery and medicine delivery, bike pool, pickup-and-drop, among other services.

In 2021, following changes to Google Play's terms that banned the sale of tobacco and liquor, Dunzo launched a parallel app called Dunzo Mo which can be downloaded as an APK file on the website. Tobacco and paan items were also no longer available on Dunzo's main app for Android users, although they were available on the iOS version and on the website.

In August 2021, Dunzo expanded into quick commerce by launching a new service, Dunzo Daily, to deliver essentials and household items in 19 minutes.

In January 2022, Reliance Retail led a US$240 million funding round along with Dunzo's existing investors Lightbox, Lightrock, 3L Capital and Alteria Capital. Reliance Retail invested US$200 million for a 25.8% stake in Dunzo. It raised over US$450 million in the round. Dalvir Suri left Dunzo on 3 October 2023, along with Mukund Jha.

Following financial difficulties and competition, the company downsized its operations and laid off many employees in 2023 and 2024. In January 2025, the app and website were shut down following exit of Kabeer Biswas who joined Flipkart. As of December 2025, Biswas has since left Flipkart, now looking to develop his own AI concierge service.

Reliance which is the largest shareholder in Dunzo is reported to have written off its $200 Mn investment in the company due to Dunzo's inability to scale.

== See also ==
- Delivery Hero
- DoorDash
