= AD Singh (restaurateur) =

Indian entrepreneur

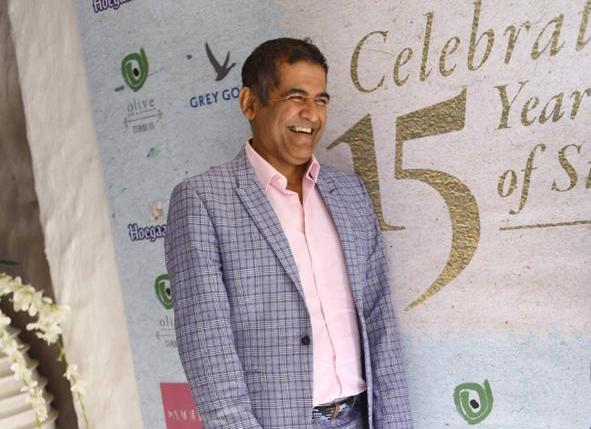
- Born: 1960 (age 65–66); New Delhi, India
- Occupation: Restaurateur
- Website: www.olivebarandkitchen.com

AD Singh is an Indian entrepreneur, the founder and Managing Director of the Olive Group of Restaurants.

== Early years ==
Born in Delhi in 1960, Singh moved to Mumbai at a young age and attended Cathedral and John Connon School. Soon after college, a scholarship at Lafayette took him to Pennsylvania to earn a degree that got him into the blue-chip companies TCS and Cadbury’s on his return to India.

Singh also worked with various NGOs, and wrote a weekly food column for The Metropolis - a part of The Times Group – in the 1990s. In 1988, he set up his first F&B venture, a boat party planning service called Party Lines.

== Career ==
Singh made his restaurant business debut in 1990 with Just Desserts, a jazz café that served only coffee and desserts. He launched Olive at Union Park, Bandra in the year 2000.

In 2003, Singh opened Olive Bar and Kitchen in New Delhi, which was announced as one of the ‘Best new restaurants in the world’ by Condé Nast Traveler. Olive won numerous awards and accolades across Mumbai, Delhi, Bengaluru, Goa, Kolkata, and Hyderabad. – where, in 2005, Singh opened Olive Beach.

Singh has launched 15 restaurant brands throughout the country. He introduced some new dining concepts in the Indian market. He established a restaurant Olive Bar and Kitchen in Mumbai, and Ek Bar which is a cocktail bar utilising mainly Indian ingredients, and Guppy which is a Japanese themed restaurant, Monkey bar described as a gastropub, then SodaBottleOpenerWala to revive a Bombay Irani café.

== Charity ==
Singh runs a group wide initiative called ‘Kitchens Against Hunger’. Wherein Rs. 10 is added to every bill as a voluntary contribution towards alleviating hunger in children in India. Olive matches the amount to double the contribution which goes towards the cause.

== Awards ==
- Delwine Excellence Awards Hall of Fame 2019
- Top Chef lifetime achievement - Restaurateur of the Year, 2016
- Eazy Diner Lifetime Achievement of the Year 2019
- DSSC announced AD Singh as The Power Packer in 2017
- The Icon of Indian Restaurant Industry Award - Big F Awards 2018
- The Lifetime Achievement award at the INCA awards 2017
- Certificate of Appreciation for exemplary contribution in the field of Food & Travel by Times Power Icons, 2018
- Awarded Hall of Fame at the Food Food awards, 2018

== Personal life ==
Singh is married to Sabina Singh who is the Design Director of Olive Group of Restaurants, with two children Zoe Tara Singh and Zen Singh residing in Mumbai.
