= National Restaurant Association of India =

Indian restaurant association

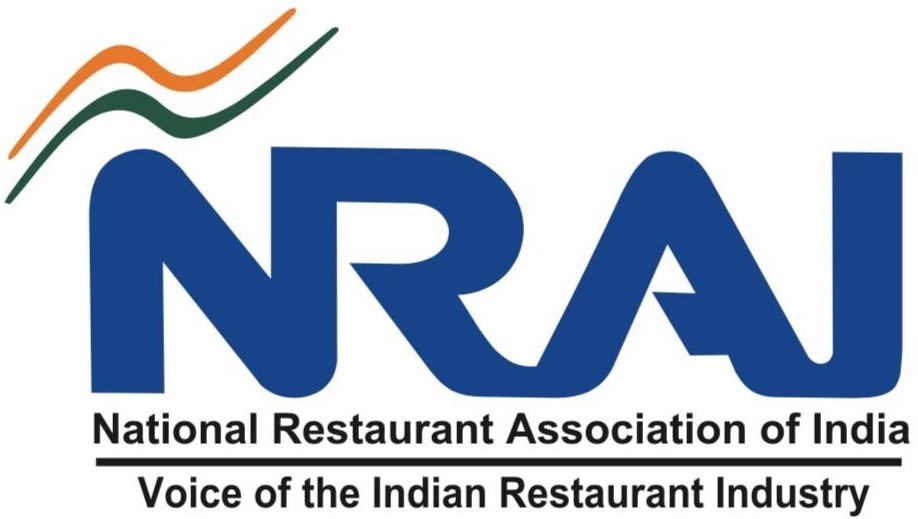
- Formation: 1982; 44 years ago
- Headquarters: Delhi 110001, India
- Revenue: Rs. 4,23,865 Crore (2019)
- Website: www.nrai.org

The National Restaurant Association of India (NRAI) is a restaurant industry business association in India. The association was founded in 1982, headquartered in Delhi. It was founded by L.C. Nirula of Nirula's, Madan Lamba of Volga, O.P. Bahl of Khyber Restaurant, R.D. Gora of Gazebo, A.S. Kamat of Kamat Restaurants, and others. Currently, Anurag Katriar is president of the organisation.

== Advocacy ==
In March 2020, NRAI asked 5 lakh restaurants to shut down during the COVID-19 pandemic in India. To help Indian restaurants and their staff, NRAI urged people to support their favourite restaurants.

In May 2020, NRAI launched an app to protect Indian restaurants and the food industry. Later, NRAI supported homeless people by feeding them meals.

== Notable members ==
- AD Singh (restaurateur)

== Controversy ==
In 2014, NRAI filed and won the hookah case in Supreme Court and restriction imposed on smoking of Hookah with tobacco content was upheld.

NRAI and Zomato clashed due to its Gold Membership in the food delivery business also. Due to this, NRAI advised restaurants and cloud kitchens to not fall for gimmicks and offer quality food at the right price. NRAI is against it because the cost of this will solely be borne by the restaurant.
