= Magicpin =

Indian hyperlocal e-commerce and discovery platform

magicpin
- Type: Private
- Industry: E-commerce
- Founded: 2015
- Founders: Anshoo Sharma, Brij Bhushan
- Headquarters: Gurugram, Haryana, India
- Number of locations: 275,000+ stores
- Area served: India
- Key people: Anshoo Sharma (Co-founder and CEO)
- Divisions: magicNOW, magicOrder
- Website: magicpin.in

magicpin is an Indian hyperlocal e-commerce and discovery platform founded in 2015 and headquartered in Gurugram, Haryana. In 2024, magicpin launched a 15-minute food delivery service and expanded its logistics operations under the brand MagicFleet.

== History ==
The company initially focused on cashback and rewards for purchases made at local stores, restaurants, and shopping outlets. After it expanded into online food delivery, logistics and quick-commerce related services. In 2017, magicpin raised US$7 million in Series B funding from Lightspeed Venture Partners. The company later received investment from Zomato In 2024, magicpin launched a 15-minute food delivery service and expanded its logistics operations through its delivery network called MagicFleet. In April 2026, magicpin launched Vera an AI-powered assistant designed to help restaurants and retailers manage their digital presence.

== See also ==
- Zepto (company)
- Zomato
