= Porter (company) =

Indian logistics company

- Type: Private
- Industry: Logistics
- Founded: 2014
- Founder: Vikas Choudhary, Uttam Digga, Pranav Goel
- Headquarters: Bengaluru, India
- Area served: India, UAE, Turkey
- Revenue: ₹4,306 crore
- Website: https://porter.in/

SmartShift Logistics Solutions Pvt. Ltd., doing business as Porter, is an Indian on-demand intra-city logistics company headquartered in Bengaluru, Karnataka. As of 2026, Porter operates in 35 cities across India and has international operations in the United Arab Emirates and Turkey.

== History ==
Porter was founded in 2014 by Pranav Goel, Uttam Digga, and Vikas Choudhary. It started as an intra-city goods transport platform and has since expanded its service categories and geographic footprint.

It received its first seed investment of about $500,000 (INR 3 crore) from Kae Capital in April 2015. The following month, in June 2015, Porter received INR 35 crore ($5.5 million) in Series A financing from Sequoia Capital and Kae Capital along with angel investors such as Rajeev Chitrabhanu, Anupam Mittal, and Sandeep Tandon.

In 2018, The Mahindra Group invested Rs 65 crore into Porter. The company achieved Unicorn status in May 2024, after raising $200 million during the Series F round.

== Operations ==
Taking a page from Uber's ride hailing model, Porter operates on an aggregator model. It connects individuals and businesses who need to transport goods with drivers of commercial vehicles, such as mini trucks, tempos, and two-wheelers. The company also offers intercity couriers, packers and movers, and enterprise logistics services.

It also offers packing and relocation services for households under the Porter Packers and Movers brand. Following a revenue-sharing model, they charge up to 30% of the billed amount depending on location, with the remainder going to driver partners.

Between FY20 and FY24, Porter's operating income rose tenfold, from INR 274 crore to INR 2,733.7 crore.

During FY25, the operating income for Porter stood at INR 4,306.2 crore, representing a 58% rise compared to the previous financial year. The company recorded profits during FY25 after recording losses in FY24, with the net consolidated profit rising to INR 55.2 crore from a loss of INR 95.7 crore during FY24. The EBITDA margin rose to 1.94%, whereas previously, it was -2.93%.

== Awards and Recognitions ==
Porter founders Pranav Goel and Uttam Digga received the Entrepreneur of the Year 2025 award in the start-up category.

== Controversies ==
In February 2026, the company’s delivery executives, along with drivers from Uber, Rapido, and Ola, went on strike. The nationwide strike, which was referred to as an “All India Breakdown," began on Feb 7, 2026. The drivers went offline for 6 hours and had several demands, including a government-notified base fare and a ban on private vehicles being used for commercial rides.

In November 2025, Porter announced that they will be laying off workers to "rationalise costs". While initially the number of laid off employees was not communicated, it was reported later that 300-350 workers were affected by the same.
