= Porter Township, Pike County, Pennsylvania =

Township in Pennsylvania, US

Porter Township
- Township
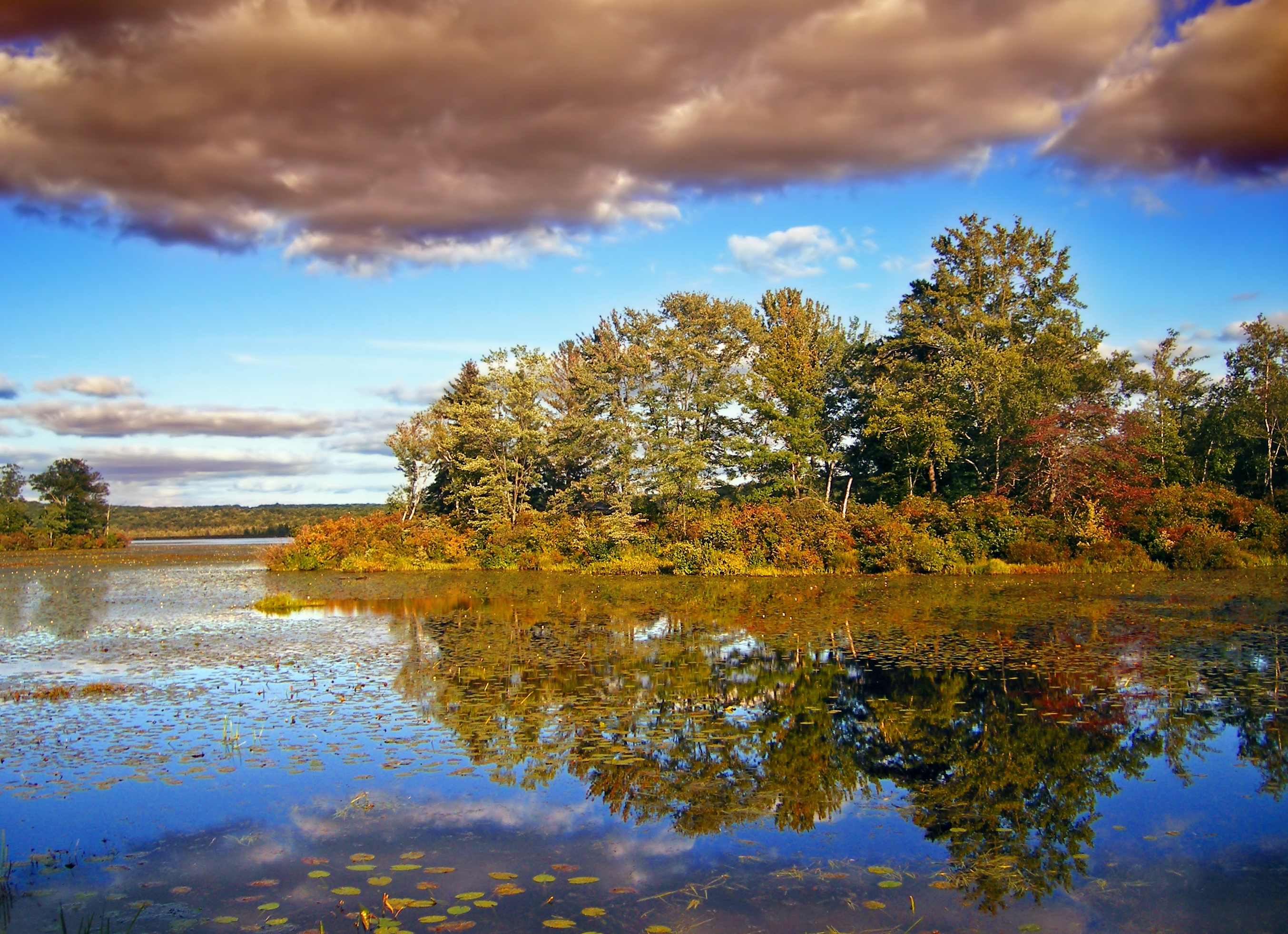
- Pecks Pond in Porter Township

- Location in Pike County and the state of Pennsylvania.

- Location of Pennsylvania in the United States
- Coordinates: 41°10′00″N 75°07′35″W
- Country: United States
- State: Pennsylvania
- County: Pike

Area
  - Total: 60.53 sq mi (156.77 km^{2})
  - Land: 58.54 sq mi (151.62 km^{2})
  - Water: 1.99 sq mi (5.15 km^{2})
- Elevation: 1,037 ft (316 m)

Population (2010)
  - Total: 485
  - Estimate (2016): 466
  - Density: 8.0/sq mi (3.07/km^{2})
- Time zone: UTC-5 (EST)
  - Summer (DST): UTC-4 (EDT)
- Area code: 570
- FIPS code: 42-103-62192
- Website: http://www.portertownship.net/

Porter Township is a township in Pike County, Pennsylvania, United States. As of the 2010 census, the township population was 485.

== Geography ==
According to the United States Census Bureau, the township has a total area of 60.5 square miles (156.7 km^{2}), of which 58.5 square miles (152 km^{2}) is land and 2.0 square miles (5 km^{2}) (3.31%) is water. It contains part of the census-designated place of Hemlock Farms.

== Demographics ==
Historical population
| Census | Pop. | Note | %± |
|---|---|---|---|
| 2010 | 485 | | — |
| 2016 (est.) | 466 | | −3.9% |
U.S. Decennial Census

As of the census of 2010, there were 485 people, 211 households, and 154 families residing in the township. The population density was 8.3 inhabitants per square mile (3.2/km^{2}). There were 896 housing units at an average density of 15.3/sq mi (6/km^{2}). The racial makeup of the township was 91.5% White, 3.3% African American, 1.4% Asian, 1% from other races, and 2.7% from two or more races. Hispanic or Latino of any race were 5.6% of the population.

There were 211 households, out of which 16.1% had children under the age of 18 living with them, 66.8% were married couples living together, 1.9% had a female householder with no husband present, and 27% were non-families. 23.2% of all households were made up of individuals, and 9.5% had someone living alone who was 65 years of age or older. The average household size was 2.30 and the average family size was 2.69.

In the township the population was spread out, with 15.6% under the age of 18, 54.7% from 18 to 64, and 29.7% who were 65 years of age or older. The median age was 52.2 years.

The median income for a household in the township was $38,125, and the median income for a family was $42,188. Males had a median income of $35,667 versus $27,143 for females. The per capita income for the township was $22,139. About 1.8% of families and 3.2% of the population were below the poverty line, including 3.1% of those under age 18 and none of those age 65 or over.
