= Paul & Daisy Soros Fellowships for New Americans =

Postgraduate fellowship for US immigrants

The Paul & Daisy Soros Fellowships for New Americans is a United States postgraduate fellowship for immigrants and children of immigrants. It was founded in 1997 by Paul Soros and Daisy Soros. In 2010, the couple had contributed a total of $75 million to the organization's charitable trust.

Each fellow receives up to $90,000 in funding toward their graduate education, which can be in any field and at any university in the United States, including public policy, science, medicine, business, law, music, arts, humanities, and the social sciences. Applicants can be pursuing master's degrees, doctorates, JD, MD, MD/PhD or other joint degrees. In 2021, the fellowship received 2,445 applications and awarded 30 fellowships for a selection rate of 1.2%.

Past fellows include former United States Surgeon General Vivek Murthy (1998 Fellow), Iranian-American Ebola researcher Pardis Sabeti (2001 Fellow) and Fei-Fei Li (1999 Fellow), a Stanford professor and artificial intelligence expert.

== Overview ==
The Paul & Daisy Soros Fellowships for New Americans supports up to two years of graduate study in any field at any advanced degree-granting program in the United States. Each fellow receives up to $25,000 a year in stipend support and up to $20,000 per year tuition support, allowing Fellows to receive as much as $90,000 over two years. Fellows attend two fall conferences in New York City designed to introduce the fellows to one another and to examine their experiences.

== Selection criteria ==
The fellowship looks for applicants who have:

- Demonstrated creativity, originality and/or initiative
- Sustained accomplishment
- Promise of future significant contributions
- Planned graduate training relevant to future goals
- Commitment to Constitution and Bill of Rights

=== Eligibility ===
New American status: If an applicant was born abroad as a non-U.S. citizen, then they must have been naturalized, be a green card holder, be adopted, or be a DACA recipient. As of 2020, anyone, regardless of documentation, who was born abroad and graduated from both high school and college in the U.S. is eligible. For all applicants, regardless if they were born in the U.S. or abroad, the parents must have been born abroad as non-U.S. citizens unless the applicant grew up in a single-parent home.

Academic standing: To be eligible, applicants must be entering graduate school or in the first two years of graduate school as of the application deadline. If a student is a PhD student, the fellowship considers the master's part of the PhD. Fellows must be enrolled in full-time graduate studies during the first year of the fellowship.

Age: Applicants cannot have reached or passed their 31st birthday as of the application deadline. The fellowship makes no exceptions.

== Paul & Daisy Soros Fellowship recipients ==
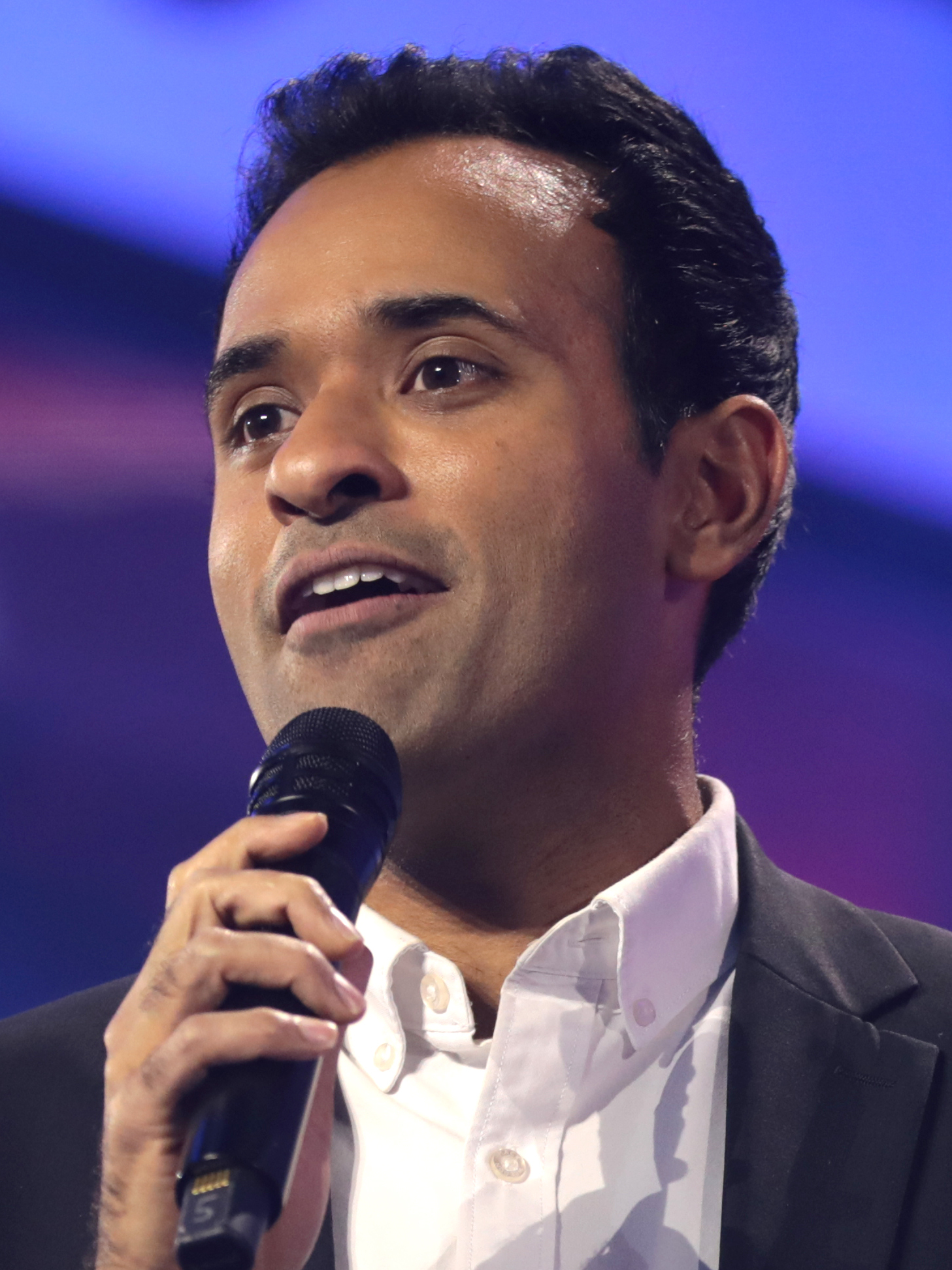
Vivek Ramaswamy

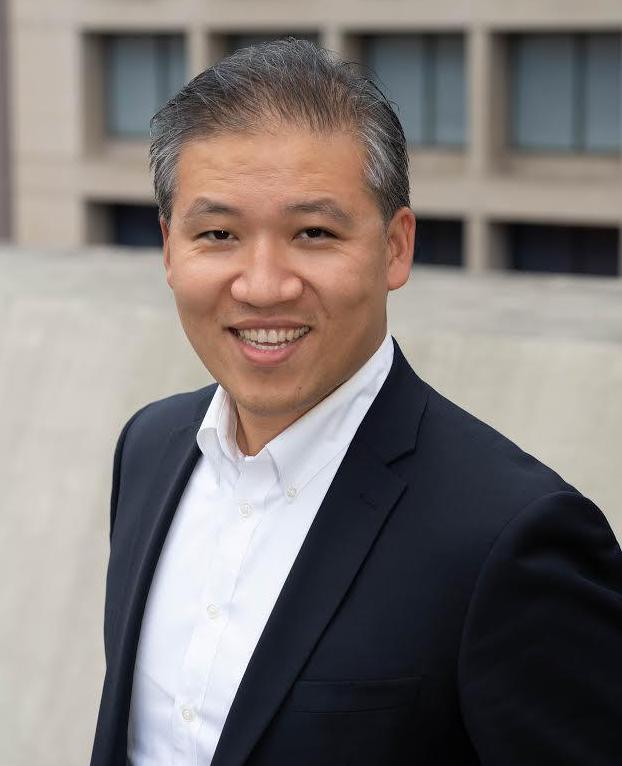
Eric Feigl-Ding

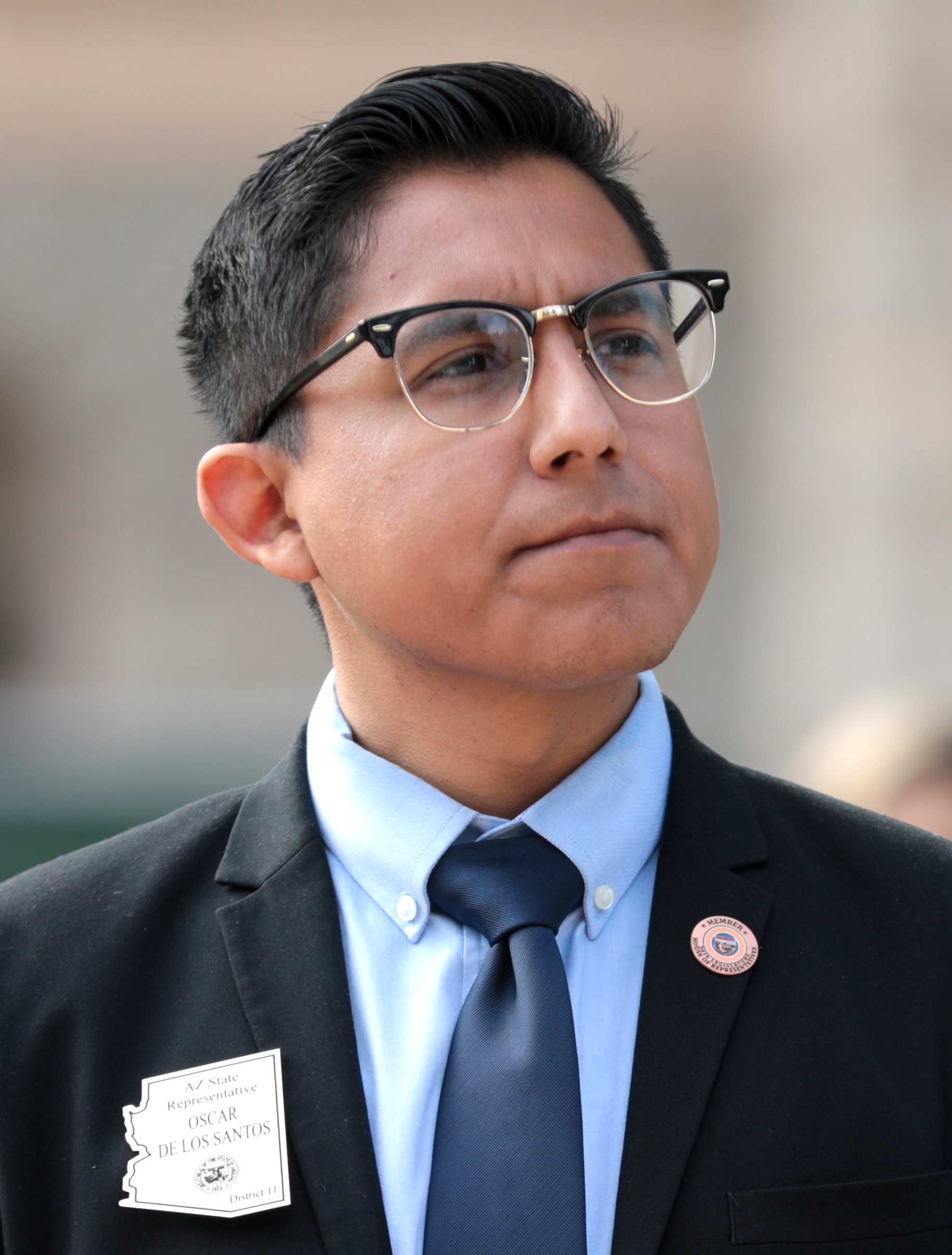
Oscar De Los Santos

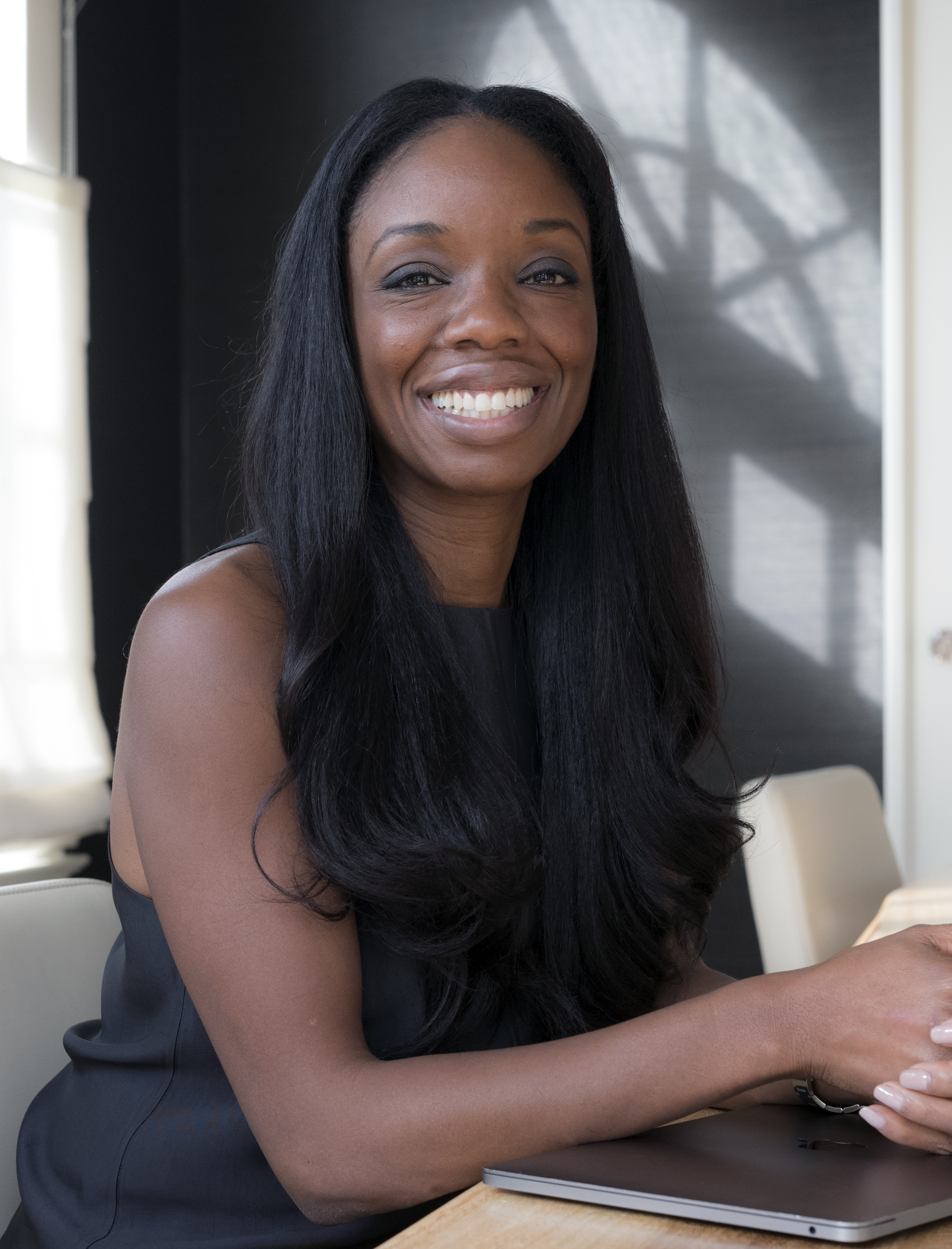
Nadine Burke Harris

As of 2022, 743 students have been recipients of The Paul and Daisy Soros Fellowships for New Americans. The following institutions have had 30 or more fellows among their graduate student ranks.

Institution	Fellows (1998–2022)
Harvard University	309
Yale University	112
Stanford University	95
Massachusetts Institute of Technology	36
Columbia University	33
University of California, Berkeley	30

Some notable fellows include:

- Abdul El-Sayed, author, former professor and former health commissioner of Detroit
- Ahmed Moor, writer and co-founder of liwwa, Inc.
- Amy Chow, physician, surgeon and former Olympic gymnast
- Anna Makanju, former U.S. National Security Council staffer, vice president of global impact at OpenAI
- Andrei Cherny, founder of Aspiration
- Anthony Veasna So, writer
- Cyrus Habib, lawyer, former lieutenant governor of Washington state, former state senator in Washington
- Derrick Ashong, music entrepreneur
- Eric Ding, epidemiologist, health economist, and COVID-19 whistleblower
- Fei-Fei Li, director of the Stanford Artificial Intelligence Lab and the Stanford Vision Lab
- Jeannie Suk, Harvard law professor
- Jeff Sheng, artist, photographer and LGBT activist
- Julissa Reynoso, chief of staff to Jill Biden and former U.S. ambassador to Uruguay
- Kao Kalia Yang, Hmong American writer and author of The Latehomecomer: A Hmong Family Memoir
- Konstantin Soukhovetski, pianist
- Lei Liang, composer
- Lera Auerbach, composer
- Mehret Mandefro, producer, writer, and founder of the multimedia production company A51 Films
- Nadine Burke Harris, former California Surgeon General, physician, author, and toxic stress expert
- Nirav D. Shah, director of Maine CDC, former director of Illinois Department of Health
- Oscar De Los Santos, an elected official in Arizona
- Paola Prestini, composer, cofounder and artistic director of National Sawdust and founder of VisionIntoArt
- Parag Pathak, MIT economist
- Pardis Sabeti, computational biologist, medical geneticist and evolutionary geneticist
- Patricia Miranda, lawyer and former Olympic wrestler
- Pelkins Ajanoh, inventor and entrepreneur
- Rashad Hussain, former U.S. special envoy and U.S. ambassador-at-large for international religious freedom
- Ron Huberman, Chicago education leader
- Sachin H. Jain, CEO of the CareMore Health System
- Salvador Plascencia, writer
- Sanjena Sathian, novelist
- Tali Farhadian, former federal prosecutor and candidate in the 2021 Democratic primary for Manhattan District Attorney
- Vikram Sheel Kumar, engineer, physician and entrepreneur
- Vivek Murthy, 19th and 21st U.S. surgeon general
- Vivek Ramaswamy, founder of Roivant and 2024 presidential candidate
- Yung Wook Yoo, pianist and composer
- Damian Williams, lawyer
