= Devika Bhushan =

Indian American pediatrician

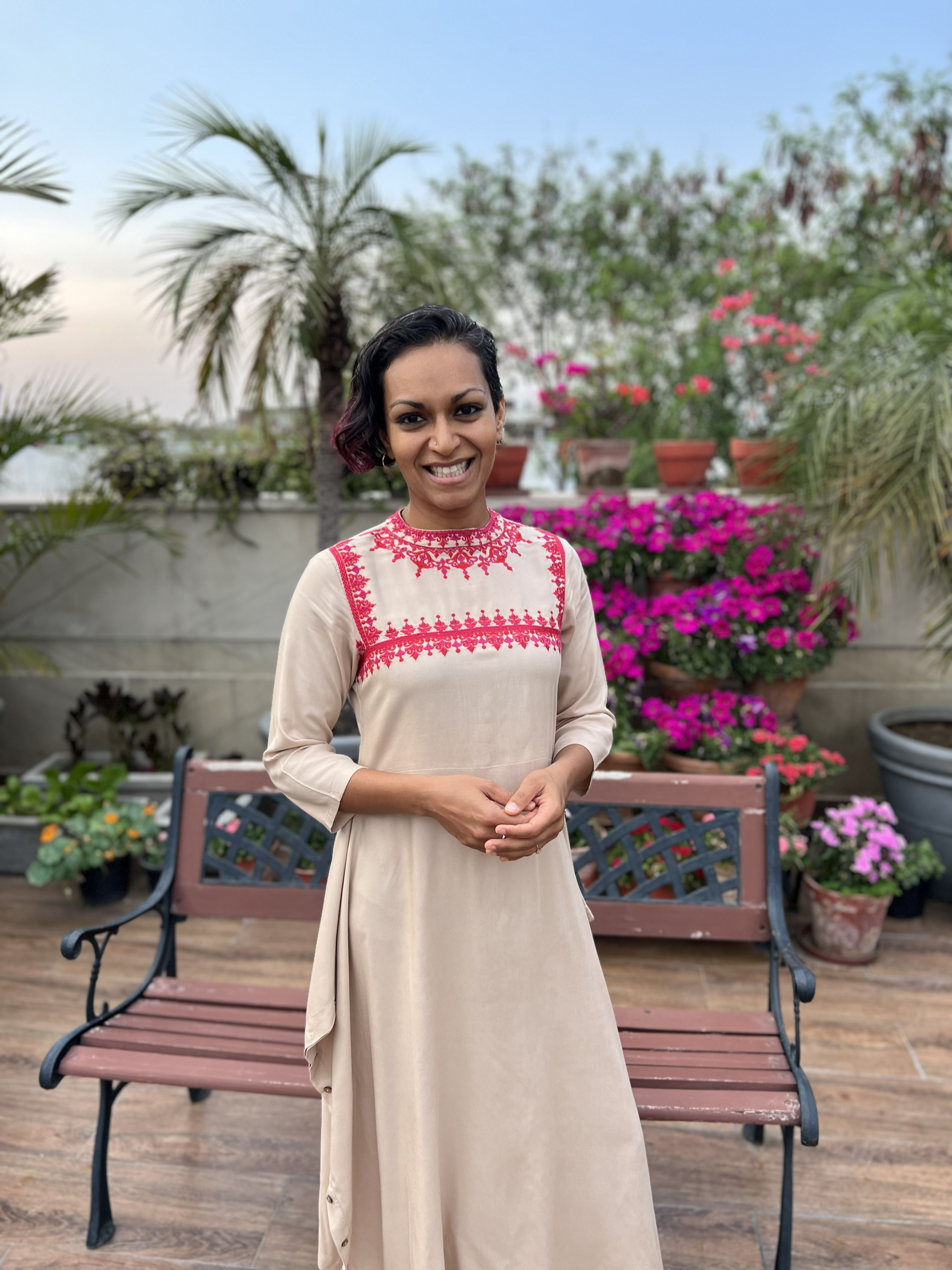
- Bhushan in 2022

Acting Surgeon General of California
- In office February 12, 2022 – September 1, 2022
- Governor: Gavin Newsom
- Preceded by: Nadine Burke Harris
- Succeeded by: Diana Ramos

Personal details
- Born: Agra, India
- Citizenship: United States
- Party: Democratic
- Education: Columbia University (BA); Harvard University (MD); Johns Hopkins University (Pediatrics residency); Stanford University (fellowship)
- Occupation: Pediatrician, public health practitioner, author
- Website: https://devikabhushan.com/

Devika Bhushan is an Indian American pediatrician, public health physician, author, and mental health advocate who served as acting Surgeon General of California in 2022. Her work focuses on public health, health innovation, adverse childhood experiences (ACEs), toxic stress, mental health, and gender and health equity.

== Early Life and Education ==
Bhushan was born in Agra, India, and was raised in India, the United States, and the Philippines. Her father is health economist Indu Bhushan.

She earned a bachelor's degree in Neuroscience and Behavior from Columbia University, completing her studies with research honors. She later received a Doctorate of Medicine (MD) from Harvard Medical School. She pursued a clinical residency in general pediatrics at Johns Hopkins Hospital. She later completed a fellowship in academic general pediatrics at Stanford University with a focus on gender and health equity. She is Board-certified in General Pediatrics.

== Career ==
Bhushan has worked across clinical medicine, academic medicine, public health leadership, and health innovation. Her area of focus include health equity, childhood adversity, toxic stress, mental health innovation, stigma and bias and gender equity.

Bhushan joined the Office of the California Surgeon General when it was established in 2019 and became its inaugural Chief Health Officer. Her work included the development of statewide public health strategies addressing childhood adversity, toxic stress, early childhood development, and health equity.This include co-developing the ACEs Aware program, administered by the California Department of Health Care Services, which supports healthcare providers in identifying and responding to the health effects of childhood trauma and toxic stress. She led preparation of Roadmap for Resilience, the cross-sector policy report on preventing and addressing adverse childhood experiences and toxic stress, released in December 2020.

In February 2022, following the resignation of Surgeon General Nadine Burke Harris, Bhushan was appointed to the role of acting Surgeon General of California by Governor Gavin Newsom.During this time, she led the Office’s work on adversity and stress, mental health, COVID-19, and health equity.

After leaving state government, Bhushan continued her work in public health, academic medicine,health innovation, and mental health advocacy. She holds an adjunct faculty appointment at Stanford University and several public health and innovation strategic advisory roles.

== Mental health advocacy ==
Bhushan has written and spoken publicly about mental health stigma, bias, and discrimination, and has disclosed her experience living with bipolar disorder. In interviews, such as with the Los Angeles Times, she has discussed the multi-faceted stigma and discrimination surrounding mental health conditions in healthcare, policies and culture.Bhushan frequently writes and speaks on these themes, such as in the keynote address for the 2023 Stanford Medicine Diversity and Inclusion Forum, where she addressed the consequences of stigma and bias for health and strategies for reducing stigmatizing communication and discriminatory behavior in healthcare.

Bhushan wrote the foreword for 2026 New Harbinger workbook, Beyond the Bipolar Label: A Workbook to Overcome Self-Stigma, Break Free from Shame, and Live Authentically, by Andrea Vassilev, PhD.

She has served on the national Board of Directors of the National Alliance on Mental Illness (NAMI).

== Selected publications ==
- Kotz K et al (2026). Impact of adverse childhood experiences, positive childhood experiences and adult protective and risk factors on health in a statewide representative sample. Family Medicine and Community Health. 14 (3): e003963. doi:10.1136/fmch-2026-003963. PMID 42628986.
- Bhushan D (foreword) in Vassilev A (2026). Beyond the bipolar label: a workbook to overcome self-stigma, break free from shame, and live authentically. New Harbinger. ISBN 978-1-64848-668-5.
- Bhushan D et al (2020). Roadmap for resilience: the California Surgeon General's report on adverse childhood experiences, toxic stress, and health (PDF). Office of the California Surgeon General.
- Gilgoff R et al (2023). Opportunities to treat toxic stress. Pediatrics. 151 (1): e2021055591. doi:10.1542/peds.2021-055591. PMID 36450652.
- Weber A et al (2019). Gender norms and health: insights from global survey data. The Lancet. 393 (10189): 2455–2468. doi:10.1016/S0140-6736(19)30765-2. PMID 31155273.
- Raney J et al (2021). Words matter: an antibias workshop for health care professionals to reduce stigmatizing language. MedEdPORTAL. 17: 11115. doi:10.15766/mep_2374-8265.11115. PMC 7970642. PMID 33768147.
- Stall N et al (2023). Unpaid family caregiving—the next frontier of gender equity in a postpandemic future. JAMA Health Forum. 4 (6): e231310. doi:10.1001/jamahealthforum.2023.1310. PMID 37294582.
- Berenson K et al (2015). Rejection sensitivity, perceived power, and HIV risk in the relationships of low-income urban women. Women & Health. 55 (8): 900–920. doi:10.1080/03630242.2015.1061091. PMID 26086275. PMC 4990078.
- Bhushan D et al (2013). Momentary affective states predicting substance use events in depressed youth. Mental Health and Substance Use. 6 (3): 203–218. doi:10.1080/17523281.2012.708357.
