= Anna Makanju =

Global policy leader (born 1976)

- Born: 1976 (age 49–50); Russia, U.S.S.R.
- Education: Western Washington University; Stanford Law School
- Known for: National Security Council staff, Obama administration; Public policy manager, Facebook; Vice president of global impact, OpenAI

Anna Adeola Makanju (born 1976) is an American lawyer, public policy professional, and advocate for AI regulation. She is currently vice president of global impact at OpenAI. She has worked in policy affairs for nearly two decades, including U.S. government roles at the Department of Defense, State Department, and National Security Council. She also previously worked in public policy positions at Facebook and SpaceX.

== Early life and education ==
Anna Makanju was born in Russia to a Ukrainian mother and a Nigerian father. Her father had come to Russia on a Soviet scholarship to study medicine; while in Russia, Makanju's father met her mother, who was an engineer. Her parents separated when she was still a child, but Makanju spent a considerable part of her early childhood in St. Petersburg.

After her mother remarried, Makanju moved frequently, residing in Lagos, Nigeria, Germany, Arizona, and Kuwait. The 1990 Iraqi invasion of Kuwait coincided with Makanju's time there, and she was sent away to live with her maternal grandparents in Ukraine. During the invasion, her stepfather was briefly taken hostage by Iraqi forces. After he was released, Makanju reunited with her mother and stepfather in Texas, where she remained to complete her high school education.

Makanju entered college at age 16, attending Western Washington University in Bellingham, Washington; she majored in linguistics and French. Shortly after her college graduation, Makanju's mother died of cancer, denied treatment by her insurer due to a pre-existing condition. Makanju began waiting tables to support herself and her sister, who struggled with addiction. Eventually, she decided to continue her education, and entered Stanford Law School. Makanju was selected for the Paul & Daisy Soros Fellowship for New Americans to pay for her law school education.

== Career ==
After earning her J.D. in 2004, Makanju chose to clerk for the International Criminal Court and the International Criminal Tribunal for the former Yugoslavia, at the Hague. Returning to the U.S., she clerked for Judge Theodore McKee of the U.S. 3rd Circuit Court of Appeals, and was then employed in the international arbitration group at Cleary Gottlieb Steen & Hamilton LLP, in New York City.

Makanju took leave from Cleary Gottlieb in 2007 to volunteer for Barack Obama's 2008 presidential campaign in the Iowa caucuses, and later returned to the campaign in the general election as a field organizer in Wisconsin. Obama's health care policies—particularly insurance coverage for pre-existing conditions—resonated with Makanju after the loss of her mother.

After Obama became president, Makanju was appointed to serve in the office of the Under Secretary of Defense for Policy, at The Pentagon. Her portfolio at the Defense Department included the countries of the former Yugoslavia, at a time when Albania and Croatia were in the process of joining NATO. She was promoted in that role, serving as chief of staff for European and NATO policy. After several years at the Pentagon, she moved to the U.S. Department of State, and served as an advisor at the U.S. Mission to the United Nations.

During President Obama's second term, Makanju joined the White House staff as a director for Russia on the U.S. National Security Council, and served as a special advisor to Vice President Joe Biden on European and Eurasian affairs.

Makanju remained in government until the end of the Obama administration. With Obama leaving office, Makanju transitioned to the private sector. She initially took a job at SpaceX, where she worked on policy to enable global access to the nascent Starlink program. In 2018, she was hired by Facebook, where she worked on global elections and policy. During those years, she also served as a nonresident senior fellow with the Atlantic Council, contributing to the Scowcroft Center for Strategy and Security and the Transatlantic Security Initiative.

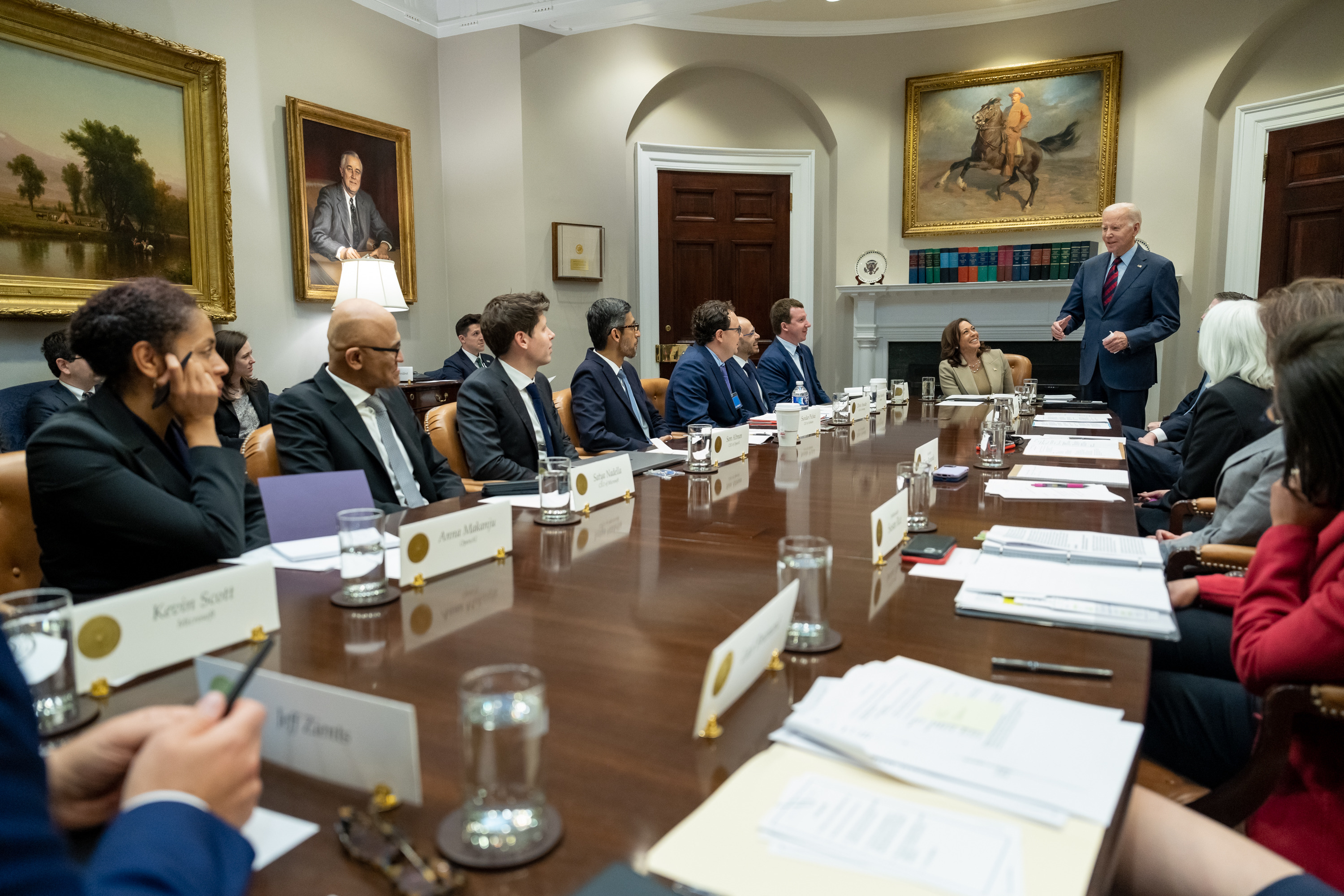
Makanju (left) at a 2023 meeting of AI executives with President Joe Biden and other government personnel at the White House.

Her growing interest in the societal impact of artificial intelligence led her to join OpenAI. Initially serving as vice president of global affairs, Makanju worked to shape the organization's engagement with international bodies. As of September 2024, she holds the position of vice president of global impact, leading efforts to ensure the responsible and ethical development and deployment of AI.

Makanju is an advocate for AI legislation, actively working to address the ethical implications of emerging technologies. Her focus is to ensure AI benefits humanity broadly and equitably, mitigating potential risks and maximizing positive societal impact. She was named to the Inaugural Time 100 AI list, which highlights influential women shaping the future of artificial intelligence.
