= Diana Ramos =

Surgeon general of California

Diana Ramos MD, MPH, MBA

2nd Surgeon General of California
- Incumbent
- Assumed office September 1, 2022
- Appointed by: Gavin Newsom
- Preceded by: Devika Bhushan (acting)

Personal details
- Education: University of Southern California (BS, MD); University of California, Los Angeles (MPH); University of California, Irvine (MBA)

Diana E. Ramos is an American obstetrician-gynecologist, public health official, and academic who serves as the Surgeon General of California. Appointed in 2022, she is the first Latina to hold the position. Her work has focused on maternal and reproductive health, adverse childhood experiences (ACEs), chronic disease prevention, and the application of technology and cross-sector partnerships to public health.

Prior to her appointment as Surgeon General, Ramos held leadership positions at the California Department of Public Health and worked for more than three decades as an obstetrician-gynecologist at Kaiser Permanente. She is also an Adjunct Assistant Professor at the Keck School of Medicine of the University of Southern California (USC). Her public health initiatives have included efforts to expand preventive healthcare, improve maternal health outcomes, and address the long-term health effects of childhood adversity.

== Education ==
Ramos earned her Doctor of Medicine (MD) from the Keck School of Medicine of the University of Southern California and a Master of Public Health (MPH) from the University of California, Los Angeles (UCLA). She also earned a Master of Business Administration (MBA) from the University of California, Irvine (UCI), Paul Merage School of Business. Ramos completed her residency in Obstetrics and Gynecology at Los Angeles General Medical Center.

Her educational background combines clinical medicine, population health, and business administration, fields that have informed her approach to public health leadership, healthcare innovation, and the development of preventive health initiatives.

== Career ==
Ramos began her medical career in obstetrics and gynecology and has practiced as a board-certified obstetrician-gynecologist at Kaiser Permanente for more than 30 years. Her clinical work has focused on women’s reproductive health, pregnancy, and maternal care.

In addition to her clinical practice, Ramos has held leadership positions in public health and participated in local, state, and national committees focused on maternal health policy, healthcare quality, and disease prevention.

Before becoming California Surgeon General, she served as Assistant Deputy Director of Chronic Disease Prevention at the California Department of Public Health. In this role, she oversaw statewide public health initiatives addressing chronic disease prevention, population health, and strategies to improve health outcomes.

Ramos has also contributed to academic medicine through her appointment as an Adjunct Assistant Professor at the Keck School of Medicine of USC. She has authored and co-authored peer-reviewed publications and participated in professional advisory committees focused on public health and healthcare quality.

She has served as president of the Orange County Medical Association, the chair for the American College of Obstetricians and Gynecologist, California & Ecuador (IX) District and nationally on the Women’s Preventive Service Initiative, American Medical Association Foundation board.

== California Surgeon General ==
In 2022, Governor Gavin Newsom appointed Ramos as California’s second Surgeon General, succeeding Dr. Nadine Burke Harris. She became the first Latina to serve in the position.

As Surgeon General, Ramos has focused on advancing preventive health strategies addressing adverse childhood experiences, reproductive and maternal health, mental health, and chronic disease. Her approach has included collaboration among government agencies, healthcare systems, academic institutions, community organizations, and private-sector partners.

Her tenure has also emphasized the use of digital health technologies, data-driven approaches, and patient-centered tools to support early identification of health risks and improve access to preventive health information.

Adverse childhood experiences and trauma-informed care

Addressing adverse childhood experiences (ACEs) has remained a central component of the Office of the California Surgeon General’s work during Ramos’s tenure. ACEs are potentially traumatic experiences occurring during childhood that have been associated with increased risks of chronic disease, mental health conditions, and other adverse health outcomes later in life.

Ramos has continued California’s efforts to expand awareness of ACEs and promote trauma-informed care through the state’s ACEs Aware initiative, established in 2020. Her work has also emphasized the importance of positive childhood experiences, supportive relationships, and safe environments in mitigating the effects of childhood adversity. Under her leadership, the office has expanded public education efforts addressing the relationship between ACEs and lifelong health, including their potential influence on reproductive health and pregnancy outcomes.

Reproductive and maternal health

In September 2024, Ramos launched Strong Start & Beyond, a statewide maternal health initiative focused on improving reproductive and maternal health outcomes and reducing preventable maternal deaths. The initiative established goals to increase awareness of preconception health and reduce maternal mortality in California.

A central component of the initiative was the development and promotion of the Preconception Medical Assessment (PreMA), a free, patient-initiated assessment designed to help individuals identify potential health risks before pregnancy and connect with preventive healthcare resources.

Under Ramos’s leadership, the Office of the California Surgeon General also developed One Small Thing, a campaign focused on the importance of social connection and practical support during the postpartum period. The initiative encourages family members, friends, and community members to provide acts of assistance to new mothers, recognizing the role of social support in maternal well-being.

Ramos has also supported partnerships with the California Department of Health Care Services, the California Department of Public Health, and maternal health quality improvement organizations to strengthen maternal healthcare practices, including initiatives related to obstetric risk assessment, hospital discharge education, and postpartum care.

Healthcare innovation and cardiovascular health

Ramos has emphasized the potential role of technology, digital health, and cross-sector collaboration in improving population health and expanding access to preventive care. Her work has included convening healthcare professionals, researchers, technology developers, academic institutions, and industry representatives to explore applications of emerging technologies in women’s health and chronic disease prevention.

In 2026, the Office of the California Surgeon General advanced Heart Health at Warp Speed, an initiative examining opportunities to improve cardiovascular disease prevention and early risk identification among women, including during pregnancy and the postpartum period. Activities associated with the initiative included a women’s cardiovascular health innovation challenge at the University of California, Irvine; a multidisciplinary think tank involving healthcare and technology leaders; and collaborations with Stanford University and the University of California, Davis.
