= Nadine Burke Harris =

Pediatrician and first Surgeon General of California

Dr. Nadine Burke Harris
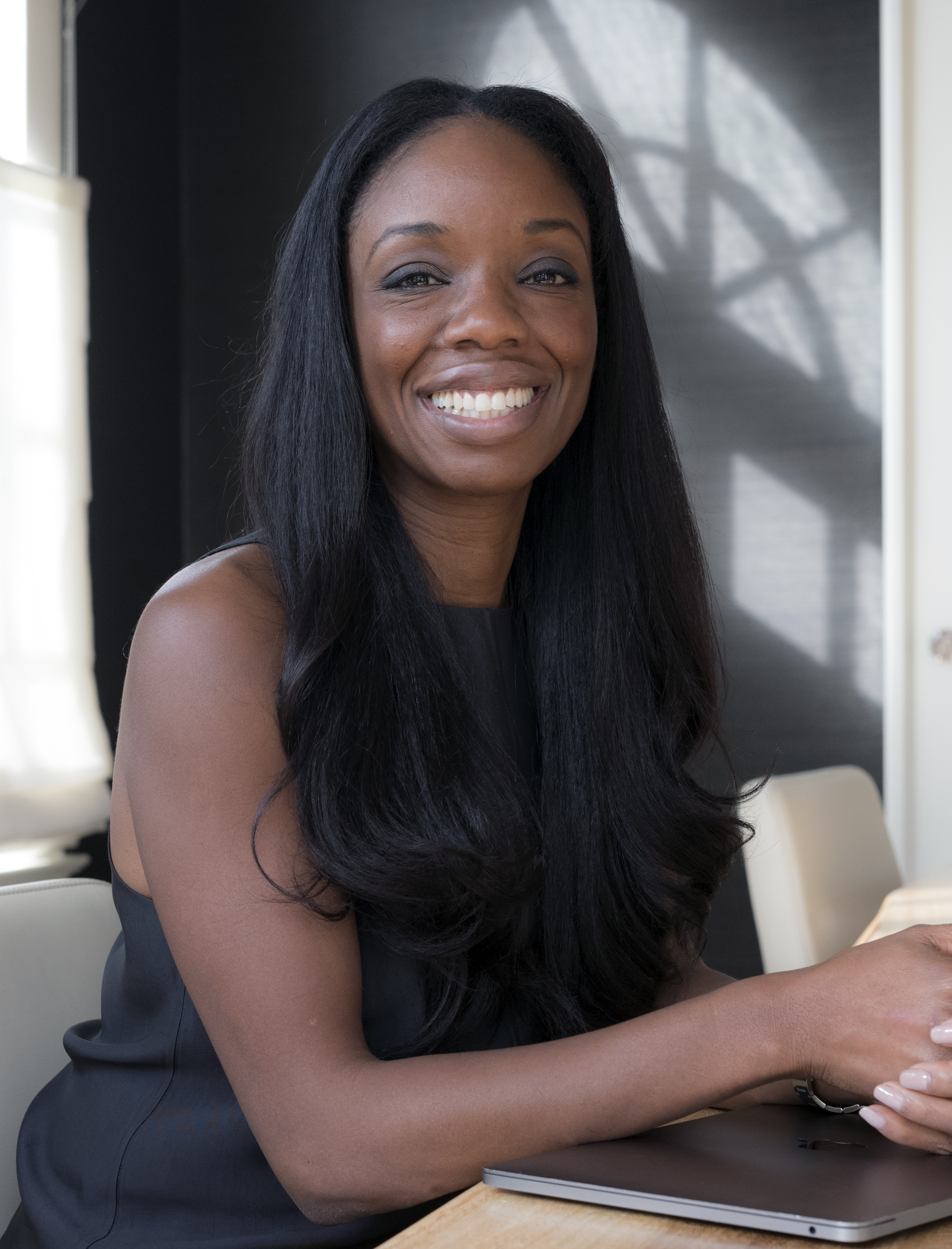

1st Surgeon General of California
- In office February 11, 2019 – February 11, 2022
- Governor: Gavin Newsom
- Preceded by: Position established
- Succeeded by: Devika Bhushan (acting)

Personal details
- Born: 1975 (age 50–51) Vancouver, British Columbia, Canada
- Citizenship: United States; Canada
- Party: Democratic
- Spouse: Arno Lockheart Harris (m. 2011)
- Education: University of California, Berkeley (BA); University of California, Davis (MD); Harvard University (MPH); Stanford University (Pediatrics)
- Occupation: Pediatrician, mental health researcher
- Website: drnadineburkeharris.com

Nadine Burke Harris (born October 5, 1975) is a Canadian-American pediatrician who was the Surgeon General of California between 2019 and 2022; she is the first person appointed to that position. She is known for linking adverse childhood experiences and toxic stress with harmful effects to health later in life. Hailed as a pioneer in the treatment of toxic stress, she is an advisory council member for the Clinton Foundation's "Too Small to Fail" campaign, and the founder and former chief executive officer of the Center for Youth Wellness. Her work was also featured in Paul Tough's book How Children Succeed.

== Early life and education ==
Nadine Burke Harris was born on October 5, 1975 in Vancouver, British Columbia. She is of Jamaican heritage and lived briefly in Jamaica before the family moved to the United States when she was 4 years old. Her father is a biochemist and her mother is a nurse. She received her bachelor's degree in integrative biology from the University of California, Berkeley in 1996 and her medical degree from the University of California, Davis. She completed her residency in pediatrics at the Lucile Packard Children's Hospital, within Stanford University School of Medicine. After earning her master's degree in public health from the Harvard T.H. Chan School of Public Health, she went on to serve a residency at Stanford in pediatrics.

Her graduate studies were supported by The Paul & Daisy Soros Fellowships for New Americans.

== Early career ==
In 2005, Burke Harris joined the California Pacific Medical Center (CPMC) staff, where she was tasked with the goal of developing programs to end health disparities in San Francisco. While at Harvard, Burke Harris identified access to health care as a key component of health disparities in San Francisco. In 2007, with support from CPMC, she became the founding physician of the Bayview Child Health Center and medical director of the new clinic.

== Career ==
In 2008, after reading "The Relationship of Adverse Childhood Experiences to Adult Health: Turning Gold Into Lead," by Vincent J. Felitti, Burke Harris realized that her patients' traumatic experiences were having a negative impact on their present and future health.

In 2011, she was appointed by the American Academy of Pediatrics to the Project Advisory Committee for the Resilience Project.

From 2010 to 2012, Burke Harris co-founded the Adverse Childhood Experiences project in the Bayview Hunters Point neighborhood in San Francisco, with colleagues Daniel Lurie from Tipping Point Foundation, Kamala Harris, Victor G. Carrion, Lenore Anderson, Lisa Pritzker, and Katie Albright. From this effort, the Center for Youth Wellness was created in 2012 to create a clinical model that recognizes the impact of adverse experiences on health and effectively treats toxic stress in children. The multidisciplinary approach focuses on preventing and undoing the chemical, physiological and neurodevelopmental results of adverse childhood experiences (ACEs). The Center integrates primary health care, mental health and wellness, research, policy, education, and community and family support services to children and families.

In 2014, she spoke at a TED event titled TEDMED in San Francisco. Her talk, "How Childhood Trauma Affects Health Across a Lifetime," had reached over 7.2 million viewers on TED.com as of June 2020.

Nadine Burke Harris presents a COVID-19 educational video during her role as California Surgeon General in 2020.

In 2018, Burke Harris released her first book The Deepest Well: Healing the Long-Term Effects of Childhood Adversity, published by Houghton Mifflin Harcourt.

On January 21, 2019, California Governor Gavin Newsom appointed her as the state's first Surgeon General. She was sworn in on February 11, 2019. On February 1, 2022, she announced she would resign to focus on her family, effective February 11, 2022.

== The Center for Youth Wellness ==
Adverse Childhood Experiences (ACEs) are defined as preventable and traumatic early experiences; they can range from exposure to violence, poverty and neglect, to physical, emotional and sexual abuse. As a result, it may increase the likelihood for "risky health behaviors, chronic health conditions, low life potential, and early death" in adulthood. Exposure to ACEs may lead to toxic stress, which varies from typical stress in that it is chronic and excessive, and results in antagonistic physiological responses that can lead to poor health outcomes in life.

The Center for Youth Wellness (CYW) aims to improve child and adolescent health by targeting the effects of Adverse Childhood Experiences. A main goal of the CYW is that "every pediatrician in the United States will screen for Adverse Childhood Experiences by 2028." More specifically, they target ACEs in San Francisco's Bayview/Hunter's Point neighborhood, a generally underserved area that had a poverty rate of 39% in 2010. The CYW identified that exposure to ACEs, along with high violence, increases the likelihood for detrimental health outcomes in this neighborhood. They use a combination of ACEs risk screening (via questionnaire), care coordination, and multidisciplinary treatment (primary care, psychotherapy, psychiatry and biofeedback).

== Personal life ==
Burke Harris married Arno Lockheart Harris in 2011 at Dawn Ranch Lodge in Guerneville, California. She is the mother of four boys. Her mother was hospitalized in the ICU, at Stanford University Medical Center, during the COVID-19 pandemic, with an illness other than COVID, and due to COVID restrictions she was unable to visit her. She resigned from her position in February 2022 to care for herself and her family.

== Committee appointments ==
- 2011–present, American Academy of Pediatrics' The Resilience Project
- 2012–present, California Health and Human Services Agency' Jerry Brown' Let's Get Healthy California Task Force, Expert Advisor

== Awards ==
- 1999, The Paul & Daisy Soros Fellowships for New Americans
- 2013, Humanism in Medicine award, Gold Humanism Honor Society
- 2014, Leadership award, James Irvine Foundation
- 2016, 21st Annual Heinz Award in Human Condition
- 2023, David G. Nichols Health Equity Award, American Pediatric Society

== Selected works ==
- 2002 "Shaping America's Health Care Professions: The Dramatic Rise of Multiculturalism". Western Journal of Medicine, 2002 176: 62–64.
- 2011 "The Impact of Adverse Childhood Experiences on an Urban Pediatric Population". Child Abuse and Neglect 35(2011) 408–413
- 2013 "The Chronic Stress of Poverty: Toxic to Children". The Shriver Report, 2013 210–213
- 2013 Scott, B, Burke, N, Hellman, J, Carrión, V, Weems, C. "The Interrelation of Adverse Childhood Experiences within an At-Risk Pediatric Sample". Routledge, 2013 217–229
- 2013 Renschler, T, Lieberman, A, Dimmler, M, Burke Harris, N. Trauma-Focused Child-Parent Psychotherapy in a Community Pediatric Clinic: A Cross-Disciplinary Collaboration. Springer Science + Business Media New York.
- 2018 Burke Harris, N. The Deepest Well: Healing the Long-Term Effects of Childhood Adversity. Houghton Mifflin Harcourt.
