= Eric Feigl-Ding =

American public health scientist

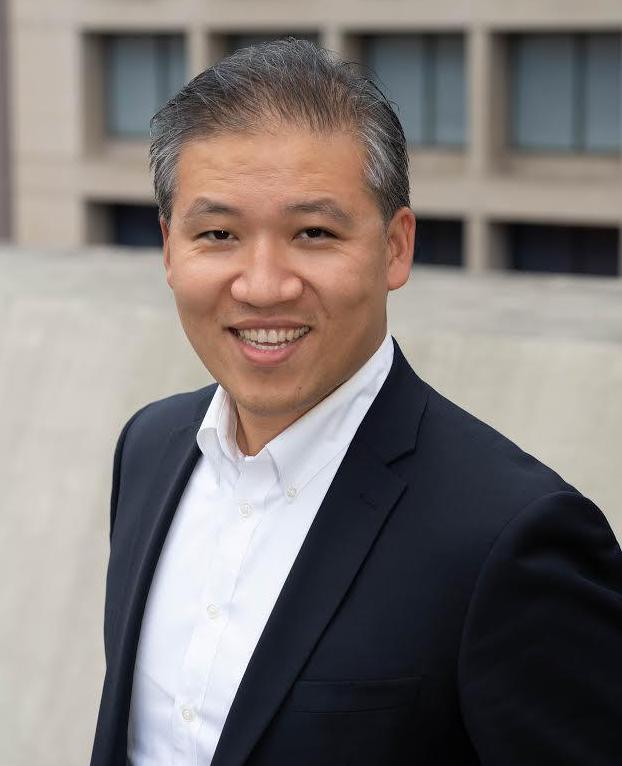
- Born: Eric Liang Ding; March 28, 1983 (age 43); Shanghai, China
- Education: Johns Hopkins University (BA); Harvard University (ScD, ScD); Boston University (DNF)
- Awards: Paul and Daisy Soros Fellowship (2008)
- Scientific career
- Fields: Public health Epidemiology; Nutrition; Health policy
- Institutions: New England Complex Systems Institute; Federation of American Scientists; Harvard T.H. Chan School of Public Health; Harvard Medical School; Brigham & Women's Hospital
- Thesis: Sex steroid hormones and type 2 diabetes risk (2007)
- Website: necsi.edu/eric-feigl-ding

Eric Liang Feigl-Ding (Chinese: 丁亮; né Ding, born March 28, 1983) is a Chinese-American public health scientist who is currently an epidemiologist and Chief of COVID Task Force at the New England Complex Systems Institute. He was formerly a faculty member and researcher at Harvard Medical School and Harvard T.H. Chan School of Public Health. He is also the Chief Health Economist for Microclinic International, and co-founder of the World Health Network. His research and advocacy have primarily focused on obesity, nutrition, cancer prevention, and biosecurity.

In January 2020, Feigl-Ding sounded an early alarm about COVID-19 and called for preparedness. His call for pandemic alarm went viral on Twitter and was amplified by media outlets. During the COVID-19 pandemic, Feigl-Ding's Twitter posts on the matter were popular. His tweets on the pandemic have been criticized by other scientists as alarmist, misleading, and inaccurate.

== Early life and education ==
Feigl-Ding was born in Shanghai, and his family emigrated to the United States when he was five years old. He was raised in South Dakota and Shippensburg, Pennsylvania, where he graduated from Shippensburg Area Senior High School and is an alumnus of the Pennsylvania Governor's Schools of Excellence.

In 2004, he completed his undergraduate studies at Johns Hopkins University with honors in public health. He completed his dual Doctor of Science doctoral program in epidemiology and doctoral program in nutrition from Harvard University in 2007. He attended Boston University School of Medicine, but did not complete the M.D. program. Feigl-Ding was awarded a Paul and Daisy Soros Fellowship for his graduate studies.

== Work ==
=== Research and work ===
Feigl-Ding's work focuses on epidemiology, health economics, and nutrition. He is the Chief of the COVID Risk Task Force at the New England Complex Systems Institute. He was a Senior Fellow at the Federation of American Scientists. He was a researcher at the Harvard Medical School, and at the Harvard T.H. Chan School of Public Health.

Feigl-Ding is also the Chief Health Economist at Microclinic International, as co-principal investigator of several intervention programs for obesity and diabetes prevention in the US and abroad. He developed a 130-year cohort study of Major League Baseball regarding the relationship between obesity and mortality in athletes. He has also developed and led public health programs for Bell County, Kentucky, the Danish Ministry of Health, and as a report chairman for the European Commission.

In 2006, while completing his doctorate at Harvard, Feigl-Ding co-authored a study on COX-2 inhibitors that confirmed serious risks specifically associated with the drug, Vioxx, which Merck had withdrawn from the market two years earlier, in 2004, and which argued that Merck should have known about the risks. He was one of over 3,000 researchers who participated in the Global Burden of Disease Study, funded by the Bill & Melinda Gates Foundation.

=== Coronavirus preparedness advocacy ===
On January 25, 2020, Feigl-Ding went viral on Twitter after expressing his worries about the 2019–20 Wuhan coronavirus outbreak virus' basic reproduction number (R_{0}) of up to 3.8. He compared the virus pandemic potential to the 1918 influenza pandemic which has an estimated R_{0} of 1.8 and which killed ~50 million people out of 2 billion, and called for WHO and CDC to preemptively declare public health emergency and monitor aggressively the situation. With the thread going viral, his appeals were criticized by some epidemiologist peers as alarmist and based on anecdotal data, by some journalists as misleading and misinforming the public, while defended by other journalists, and other epidemiologist peers, such as his former Harvard adviser Simin Liu, a Harvard School of Public Health and Brown University School of Public Health professor of epidemiology. While Feigl-Ding deleted his earliest tweets, the rapid development of the epidemic, first in China in January, then in Europe in February–March and in the United States in March, together with more studies on the virus, turned his perceptions into that of an early messenger, and he was invited as a commentator on the pandemic by news media. An earlier Atlantic article by Alexis Madrigal was self-admitted by Madrigal to be due for a re-assessment after his realization of the pandemic and reading of the assessment by David Wallace-Wells. Madrigal admitted that his earlier "...piece made sense on Planet A, where a pandemic was not bearing down on us, but not on Planet B, where we all now live. It was right in the particulars and wrong on the big picture.". New York Magazine editor David Wallace-Wells's article that convinced Madrigal to change his assessment concluded that "a Feigl-Ding level of alarm, enacted into public-health policy at the right time, could have prevented the entire global pandemic crisis, and kept COVID-19 a regional health story in just one country of the world."

==== Controversies concerning epidemiological expertise and accuracy ====
Feigl-Ding holds doctorates in both epidemiology and nutrition, with his professional experience in nutritional epidemiology and epidemiology of chronic disease. Prior to the COVID-19 pandemic, his research work and expertise primarily focused on the health effects of diet and exercise, he also lacked academic publication in infectious disease epidemiology, the subfield of epidemiology most relevant to viral outbreaks and COVID-19. Because of this, Feigl-Ding has been criticized for misrepresenting his qualifications to offer media commentary on the COVID-19 pandemic. Feigl-Ding has said he is not sub-specialized in infectious diseases and claims to have never misrepresented himself as an infectious disease epidemiologist.

Feigl-Ding's rapid rise to prominence as a TV and media commentator and expert during the COVID-19 pandemic, despite his lack of academic activity in infectious diseases, has led to much criticism and controversy. He received early criticism for offering public warnings on the COVID-19 pandemic as well as praise from David Wallace-Wells, editor-at-large at New York Magazine. A January 2020 article published by The Atlantic covered the early controversy of Feigl-Ding's social media presence. On March 26, Alexis Madrigal, its author, re-assessed his piece and stated that "it was right in the particulars and wrong on the big picture." While Feigl-Ding admits he has made mistakes, one of his supporters, Ali Nouri, the president of the Federation of American Scientists (FAS), a scientific think tank dedicated to science communication, attributed some of the criticism of Feigl-Ding down to stylistic differences in information dissemination.

His tweets during the pandemic have also at times been criticized by other scientists as alarmist, misleading, and inaccurate.

== Political campaign ==
Feigl-Ding was a candidate in the 2018 Democratic primary for Pennsylvania's 10th congressional district. On February 27, 2018, Feigl-Ding announced his candidacy in the Democratic primary for Pennsylvania's 10th congressional district. He campaigned on a progressive platform advocating for science, universal healthcare, and public health. During the run up to the election, Feigl-Ding did not take corporate PAC money. He received 18% of the vote to George Scott's 36% in a 4-person primary.

== Awards and recognition ==
Feigl-Ding's graduate studies were supported by the Paul and Daisy Soros Fellowship for New Americans (2008). He was recognized by Craigslist founder Craig Newmark as one of “16 People and Organizations Changing the World in 2012”. He was invited to join the Global Shapers program of the World Economic Forum, and joined in February 2013. He received the CUGH's Global Health Project of the Year Prize in 2014, and the American Heart Association's Scott Grundy Excellence Award in 2015. He was named in 2018 as a Web of Science 'Highly Cited Researcher', among the top 1% most cited scientists worldwide, and among the 186 top cited scientists at Harvard University.

== Personal life ==
Eric Ding married health economist Andrea Feigl in the mid 2010s. In the fall of 2020 they moved to Austria so that their son could attend school in person while schools were closed in the U.S.
