= John Amaechi =

English psychologist and basketball player (born 1970)

John Amaechi OBE
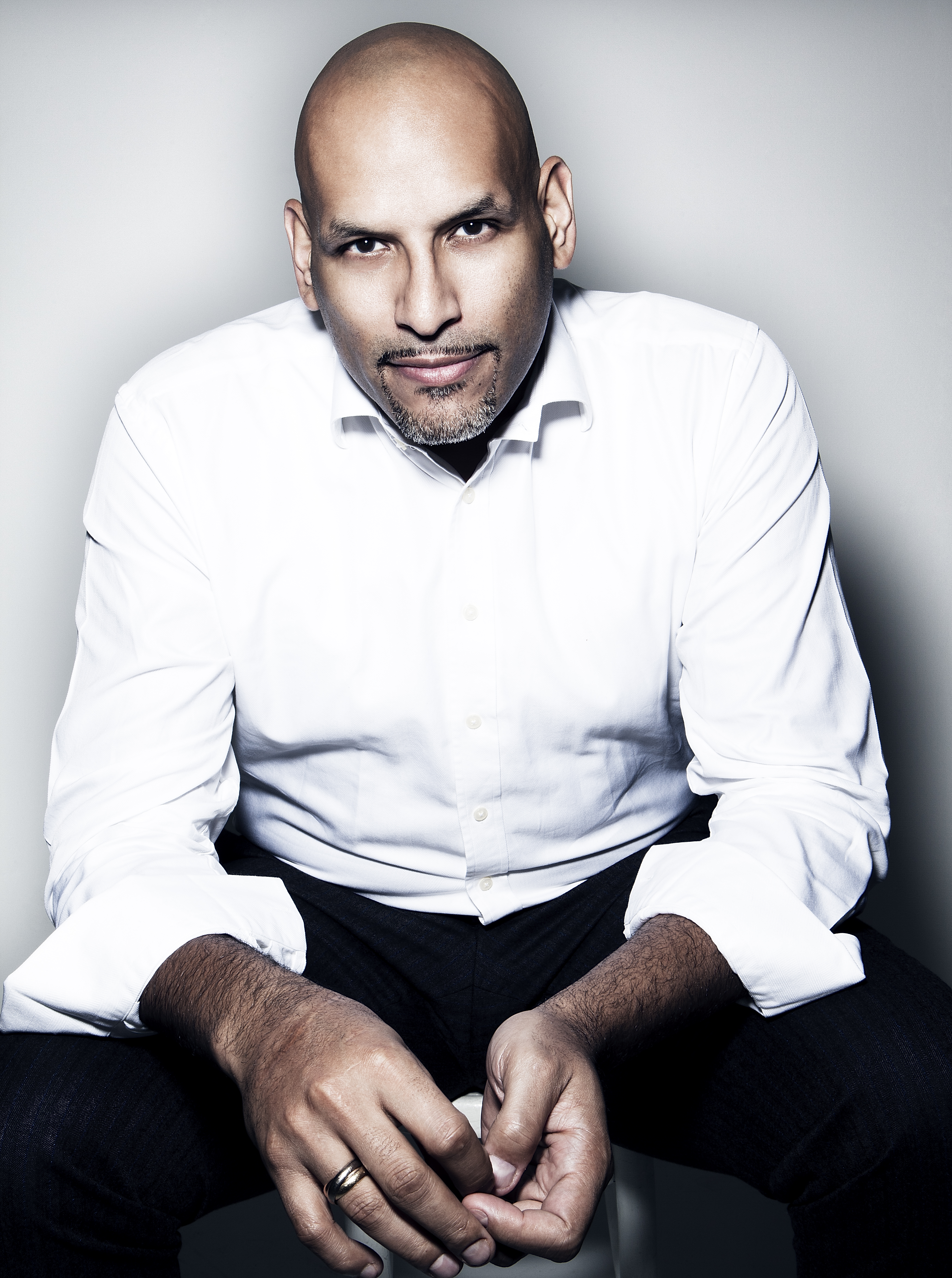

Personal information
- Born: 26 November 1970 (age 55) Boston, Massachusetts, U.S.
- Listed height: 6 ft 10 in (2.08 m)
- Listed weight: 270 lb (122 kg)

Career information
- High school: Stockport Grammar School (Stockport, England); St. John's (Toledo, Ohio)
- College: Vanderbilt (1990–1991); Penn State (1992–1995)
- NBA draft: 1995: undrafted
- Playing career: 1995–2003
- Position: Power forward / center
- Number: 13, 26

Career history
- 1987–1988: Manchester United
- 1995–1996: Cleveland Cavaliers
- 1996: Cholet
- 1996–1997: Panathinaikos
- 1997: Virtus Bologna
- 1997–1998: Sheffield Sharks
- 1998–1999: CSP Limoges
- 1999–2001: Orlando Magic
- 2001–2003: Utah Jazz

Career highlights
- FIBA Intercontinental Cup champion (1996); BBL MVP (1998); BBL All-Star (1998)

Career NBA statistics
- Points: 1,837 (6.2 ppg)
- Rebounds: 772 (2.6 rpg)
- Assists: 228 (0.8 apg)
- Stats at NBA.com
- Stats at Basketball Reference
Medals
Men's basketball
Representing England
Commonwealth Games
Bronze medal – third place	2006 Melbourne	Team

John Uzoma Ekwugha Amaechi //, OBE (/əˈmeɪtʃi/; born 26 November 1970) is an English former professional basketball player, a psychologist, and a consultant. He played college basketball for the Vanderbilt Commodores and Penn State Nittany Lions, and professional basketball in the National Basketball Association (NBA). Amaechi played in France, Greece, Italy, the United Kingdom and the United States. Since retiring from basketball, Amaechi has worked as a psychologist and consultant, establishing his company Amaechi Performance Systems.

In February 2007, Amaechi became the first former NBA player to publicly come out as gay after doing so in his memoir Man in the Middle. Since then, he has been regarded as "one of the world's most high-profile gay athletes".

== Early life and education ==
John Uzoma Ekwugha Amaechi was born on 26 November 1970 in Boston, Massachusetts to an English mother and a Nigerian Igbo father. He and his two younger sisters were raised by their mother in the Heaton Moor suburb of Stockport, England, with him attending Tithe Barn Primary School before moving on to the Stockport Grammar School. He first played basketball at the age of 17, coached by Joe Forber, who he has described as a father figure. He then signed for the Manchester United basketball team, later known as the Manchester Eagles. His form for Manchester United led Amaechi move to the United States to play high school basketball at St. John's Jesuit High School in Toledo, Ohio. He began playing college basketball at Vanderbilt University but transferred to Penn State, where he was a two-time First Team Academic All-American selection.

== Basketball career ==
The 6 ft 10 in (2.08 m), 270 pounds (120 kg) centre was undrafted and then signed with the Cleveland Cavaliers in 1995. Amaechi became the first undrafted player to start in his first NBA game as the Cavaliers' starting centre, Michael Cage, did not play in the season opener due to injury. Amaechi played 28 games for the Cavaliers during the 1995–96 season, then played for two years for Cholet and Limoges in France; Virtus Bologna in Italy; Panathinaikos in Greece; and Sheffield Sharks in the United Kingdom. In September 1996, he won the FIBA Intercontinental Cup with Panathinaikos, being the highest scorer (alongside Fragiskos Alvertis) in the team with 59 points in three games of the tournament. In the 1997–98 season he played with Virtus Bologna but left mid-season.

He returned to the US, signing with the Orlando Magic in 1999. In the 1999–2000 season he averaged 10.5 points in 21.1 minutes per game. Amaechi was known for turning down a $17 million contract offer from the Los Angeles Lakers in 2000, opting to remain in Orlando for $600,000 per year. Amaechi went on to play for the Utah Jazz from 2001 to 2003.

He was traded to the Houston Rockets before the 2003–04 season in exchange for Glen Rice, and, though he was an active player, he did not participate in any games for them. The Rockets later traded him and Moochie Norris to the New York Knicks for Clarence Weatherspoon before the Knicks bought him out of his contract and he eventually retired from playing the sport.

== Career statistics ==
Legend
GP	Games played	GS	Games started	MPG	Minutes per game
FG%	Field goal percentage	3P%	3-point field goal percentage	FT%	Free throw percentage
RPG	Rebounds per game	APG	Assists per game	SPG	Steals per game
BPG	Blocks per game	PPG	Points per game	**Bold**	Career high

=== EuroLeague ===
Year	Team	GP	GS	MPG	FG%	3P%	FT%	RPG	APG	SPG	BPG	PPG	PIR
1996–97	Panathinaikos	**16**	—	**24.9**	**.549**	—	**.677**	**5.8**	**.5**	**1.1**	.0	**11.0**	—
1997–98	Virtus Bologna	6	—	14.2	.542	—	.647	3.8	**.5**	.3	.0	6.2	—
Career		22	—	19.6	.546	—	.662	4.8	.5	.7	.0	8.6	—

=== NBA ===
==== Regular season ====
Year	Team	GP	GS	MPG	FG%	3P%	FT%	RPG	APG	SPG	BPG	PPG
1995–96	Cleveland	28	3	12.8	.414	—	.576	1.9	.3	.2	.4	2.8
1999–00	Orlando	80	**53**	**21.1**	**.437**	**.167**	**.766**	**3.3**	**1.2**	**.4**	**.5**	**10.5**
2000–01	Orlando	**82**	36	20.9	.400	.000	.631	**3.3**	.9	.3	.4	7.9
2001–02	Utah	54	0	10.9	.325	—	.638	2.0	.5	.1	.2	3.2
2002–03	Utah	50	1	9.5	.314	—	.481	1.5	.4	.3	.1	2.0
Career		294	93	16.4	.403	.077	.671	2.6	.8	.3	.3	6.2

==== Playoffs ====
Year	Team	GP	GS	MPG	FG%	3P%	FT%	RPG	APG	SPG	BPG	PPG
1996	Cleveland	1	0	2.0	.000	—	—	.0	.0	.0	.0	.0
2001	Orlando	**4**	0	7.3	**.375**	—	**.750**	**.8**	**.8**	**.8**	**.5**	**2.3**
2003	Utah	2	0	**8.0**	.250	—	.500	.5	.0	.0	.0	2.0
Career		7	0	6.7	.308	—	.625	.6	.4	.4	.3	1.9

== Career after basketball ==
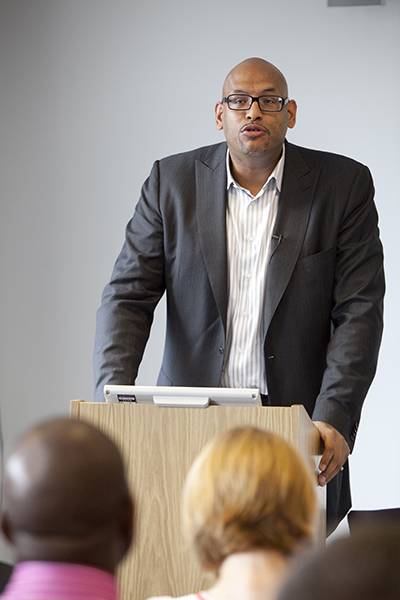
Amaechi speaking in May 2009

Amaechi came out of retirement to represent England during the 2006 Commonwealth Games in Melbourne, helping the England team win the bronze medal. In all, Amaechi appeared in 18 games for England.

He has worked in the media, particularly as a commentator on basketball for British TV shows covering the NBA, and for the BBC during Olympic games. In addition, Amaechi was a judge on the BBC Series The Speaker in 2009. He has also been a regular guest host of the BBC Radio Manchester Business show with Steven Saul and has appeared on The Dan Le Batard Show with Stugotz on ESPN Radio as a guest and guest co-host.

Amaechi owns Amaechi Performance Systems, which is a consultancy working with numerous companies to improve leadership and communication skills and organisational diversity.

Amaechi is a member of the American Psychological Association, the British Psychological Society (BPS), the BPS Division of Organisational Psychology and the BPS Psychological Testing Centre. Amaechi also became a senior fellow at the centre for Emotional Literacy and Personal Development at the University of Central Lancashire (UCLAN) in the United Kingdom.

Amaechi is also involved with the ABC Foundation in Manchester, which encourages children to become involved in sports and their communities by building youth sports centres throughout the United Kingdom. The first such facility, the Amaechi Basketball Centre, was built in Manchester, not far from Amaechi's childhood home of Stockport. The venue is also home to the English Basketball League's Manchester Magic (men) and Manchester Mystics (women), both of which are owned by Amaechi.

In a radio interview, Amaechi said that he was returning to education to get a PhD in psychology. "I want to do something more meaningful in my life," he said. Amaechi also explained why he played for Orlando in 2000 for much less than the $17 million offered to him by the Lakers; his answer was that Orlando had signed him in 1999 when no other team would. "There are many people who are asked what their word is worth, and when people ask me that I can say, 'At least $17 million.'" Amaechi retired from the NBA in 2003.

== Personal life ==
Amaechi is the first NBA player to share that he is gay. In February 2007, Amaechi spoke about his sexuality on ESPN's Outside the Lines program. He also released a book, Man in the Middle, published by ESPN Books, which discusses his career and life as a closeted professional athlete. Amaechi is the first National Basketball Association (NBA) player to speak publicly about being gay.

Few male team sports players in the United States have come out as gay. Former Major League Baseball player Billy Bean wrote an op-ed in support of Amaechi's decision.

Cyd Zeigler, the co-founder of Outsports.com, a website dedicated to the gay contribution to sports, said, "I don't think (Amaechi's declaration) will have any effect on his ability to do that," referring to Amaechi's businesses and charitable work. "You will have some people who will raise an eyebrow," Zeigler added.

In a 2002 interview with Scotland on Sunday, Amaechi had previously spoken about gays in the NBA: "If you look at our league, minorities aren't very well represented. There's hardly any Hispanic players, no Asian-Americans, so that there's no openly gay players is no real surprise. It would be like an alien dropping down from space. There'd be fear, then panic: they just wouldn't know how to handle it."

In May 2007, a few months after coming out, Amaechi said he had "underestimated America", adding that he had expected the "wrath of a nation" but it never materialised. He made these statements despite having been the subject of death threats a few months earlier.

In August 2008, Amaechi was sent to Beijing to do Olympic Men's and Women's Basketball broadcasts and reporting for the BBC. There, he wrote a blog with fellow activist and photographer Jeff Sheng in partnership with Amnesty International. He used Sheng's knowledge of Mandarin and experience in Beijing to interview with both locals and the athletes.

In 2008, Amaechi made several appearances on Shirts & Skins, a reality series on LOGO Television. He acted as team "mentor" and "psychologist" to the San Francisco Rockdogs, a gay basketball team, and shared his experiences on basketball, life, and coming out. In 2010, Amaechi made public that he had been denied entry to a gay bar in Manchester, allegedly because the doorman felt he was "big, black and could be trouble". He said he was considering legal action.

=== Reaction from other players ===
One widely publicized response to Amaechi's announcement came from former NBA player Tim Hardaway, who stated that he would demand that a gay player be removed from his team: "First of all I wouldn't want him on my team. Second of all, if he was on my team I would really distance myself from him because I don't think that's right and I don't think he should be in the locker room when we're in the locker room. Something has to give. If you have 12 other ball players in your locker room that's upset and can't concentrate and always worried about him in the locker room or on the court or whatever, it's going to be hard for your teammates to win and accept him as a teammate." Hardaway later apologised for his remarks.

Some players gave Amaechi public support: former Magic teammate Grant Hill said: "the fact that John has done this, maybe it will give others the comfort or confidence to come out as well, whether they are playing or retiring." Shaquille O'Neal told the New York Daily News, "If he was on my team, I guess I would have to protect him from the outsiders, I'm not homophobic or anything. I'm not the type who judges people, I wish him well." Charles Barkley said: "It shouldn't be a big deal to anybody. I know I've played with gay players and against gay players and it just shouldn't surprise anybody or be any issue."

However, the prevailing public statements from NBA players tended toward an expression of mixed feelings on the matter. Steven Hunter said that he would accept an openly gay teammate "as long as he [didn't] make any advances toward me. As long as he came to play basketball like a man and conducted himself like a good person, I'd be fine with it." That sentiment was echoed, though less tactfully, by Shavlik Randolph, who said that "as long as you don't bring your gayness on me I'm fine. As far as business-wise, I'm sure I could play with him. But I think it would create a little awkwardness in the locker room." Pat Garrity warned that an openly gay player could expect to face both acceptance and hostility from his teammates. He said that "they would have teammates that would accept them for being a good person and a good teammate, and there would be people who would give him a hard time about it. I think that's true if you're playing basketball or in an office job. That's just how the world is right now." LeBron James said, "With teammates you have to be trustworthy, and if you're gay and you're not admitting that you are, then you are not trustworthy. So that's like the No. 1 thing as teammates – we all trust each other.... It's a trust factor, honestly. A big trust factor."

== Awards ==
Amaechi was awarded an Honorary Degree of Doctor of Science by Manchester Metropolitan University on 19 July 2007 in recognition of his achievements not only as an athlete and broadcaster, but also for his charitable work with the National Literacy Trust, the National Society for the Prevention of Cruelty to Children (NSPCC) and the establishment of the ABC Foundation to encourage children to become involved in sport and their community.

Amaechi was appointed Officer of the Order of the British Empire (OBE) in the 2011 Birthday Honours for services to sport and the voluntary sector. He was also conferred with an Honorary Doctorate of Arts by the University of East London.

== Bibliography ==
- Amaechi, John (2007). Man in the Middle. ESPN. ISBN 978-1933060194.
- Amaechi, John (2021). The Promises of Giants. Nicholas Brealey. ISBN 978-1529345872.
