= Shirts & Skins =

- Country of origin: United States
- Original language: English
- No. of seasons: 1
- No. of episodes: 6

Production
- Executive producers: Eddie October; William Kendall; Dave Mace
- Running time: 30 minutes per episode

Original release
- Network: Logo
- Release: September 15, 2008

Shirts & Skins an American 6-episode television reality series premiered September 15, 2008 on Logo. The show explores the lives of the San Francisco The Rockdogs, "an all-gay basketball team trying to uphold its three-generation legacy of international Gay Games gold medals, and U.S. national tournament wins".

After their 2006 Gay Games victory, the Rockdogs split up due to weakened team morale and interpersonal conflict amongst the team members. In the series, many team members return to San Francisco and stay in a refurbished firehouse where the teammates live and practice for the Chicago National Championship. The show focuses on six players of the team and lives on and off the court: Mike Survillion, Rory Ray, Peter Hannibal, Chris Johnson, Jamel Lewis and DeMarco Majors. With only a month to train before the national championship, all of the men will have to put aside their differences and learn to become a team again. Guest appearances in the show include professional basketball athletes John Amaechi and Sheryl Swoopes. Sports Illustrated described the series as "The Rockdogs have talent, and the show's basketball action is strong. On and off the court someone like [Shavlik] Randolph could learn a few things from Shirts".

== Overview ==
Set in San Francisco, the show features the lives of players Chris, DeMarco Majors, Jamel, Mikey, Peter, and Rory, as they share a house in San Francisco's Mission district and prepare, physically and financially, for the 2008 national basketball tournament held in Chicago. Shirts & Skins premiered September 15, 2008 on the Logo television network.

The show spanned six episodes and featured guest appearances from gay professional athletes such as former-NBA player John Amaechi as the team's "mentor" and "psychologist", and WNBA Superstar Sheryl Swoopes.

== Episodes ==
No.	Title	Original release date	US viewers (millions)
1	"On the Rocks"	September 15, 2008	N/A
Meet the San Francisco Rockdogs, an all-star gay basketball team with a three-generation legacy of winning, and a new generation of talented athletes with big dreams. Follow Mike, Rory, Chris, Peter, Jamel and Coach Alex as they strive to reach another National Championship title. Once reunited under one roof, Jamel shocks the team with a surprise announcement before a challenging game against the San Francisco Fire Department team.
2	"Love the Game"	September 22, 2008	N/A
Former and out NBA pro basketball player John Amaechi arrives to motivate the Rockdogs as they struggle to reach the National Gay Basketball Championships in Chicago. Amaechi also helps the team console Mike when he admits that he is not yet out to his family and friends. At the team dinner, Rory presents a fundraising idea, which the Rockdogs support despite skepticism from others.
3	"Hoop Dreams"	September 29, 2008	N/A
With teammates hurling accusations about commitment and talent at each other, Jamel decides to miss practice before their monumental game against the pro San Francisco ABA team, the Rumble. At the tip-off, Coach Alex benches Jamel for missing practice and the Rockdogs rely on DeMarco to pull them through.
4	"Sister Swoopes"	October 6, 2008	N/A
Just as the Rockdogs find themselves in desperate need of inspiration after their loss to ABA Rumble pro team, WNBA pro superstar Sheryl Swoopes surprises the guys with a visit. Swoopes lifts the Rockdogs’ spirits by sharing her experiences on hoops, family, faith and coming out, and helps bring the team closer together. With hopes of proving Papa Joe wrong and raising enough money to get the team to the National Championships, Rory and Francis prepare for the fundraiser and prime the house for the boys to strut their stuff in sexy swimsuits and undergear.
5	"A Family That Plays Together"	October 20, 2008	N/A
Former NBA pro and life-coach John Amaechi returns to check-in on the Rockdogs as the Chicago National Gay Basketball Championships near and notices that the team is still disorganized. In an attempt to promote greater team and family unity, Coach Alex and Papa Joe arrange a reunion game between the original “Old Dogs” and new Rockdogs. Afterwards, the three-generations of Rockdogs are immersed in an emotionally charged dinner at the training house, where “Old Dogs” share the history and legacy of the team.
6	"The Big Dance"	October 27, 2008	N/A
Francis brings some of the guys to Glide Memorial Church for inspiration, before heading to the National Gay Basketball Championships in Chicago. The Rockdogs fall into chaos when star guard DeMarco comes down with the flu and Simon, Jamel, and others get sick after arriving in Chicago. Coach Alex and Papa Joe come to the rescue, but with six games to play in two days the Rockdogs’ legacy is at stake.

== Notable guest stars ==
- John Amaechi
- Sheryl Swoopes

== Awards ==
Shirts & Skins was nominated for a 2008 GLAAD Media Award in the Outstanding Reality Program category, along with other reality shows America's Next Top Model (The CW), I Want to Work for Diddy (VH1), Kathy Griffin: My Life on the D-List (Bravo), and Transamerican Love Story (Logo).
