= Indu Bhushan =

Indian bureaucrat and economist

Dr. Indu Bhushan
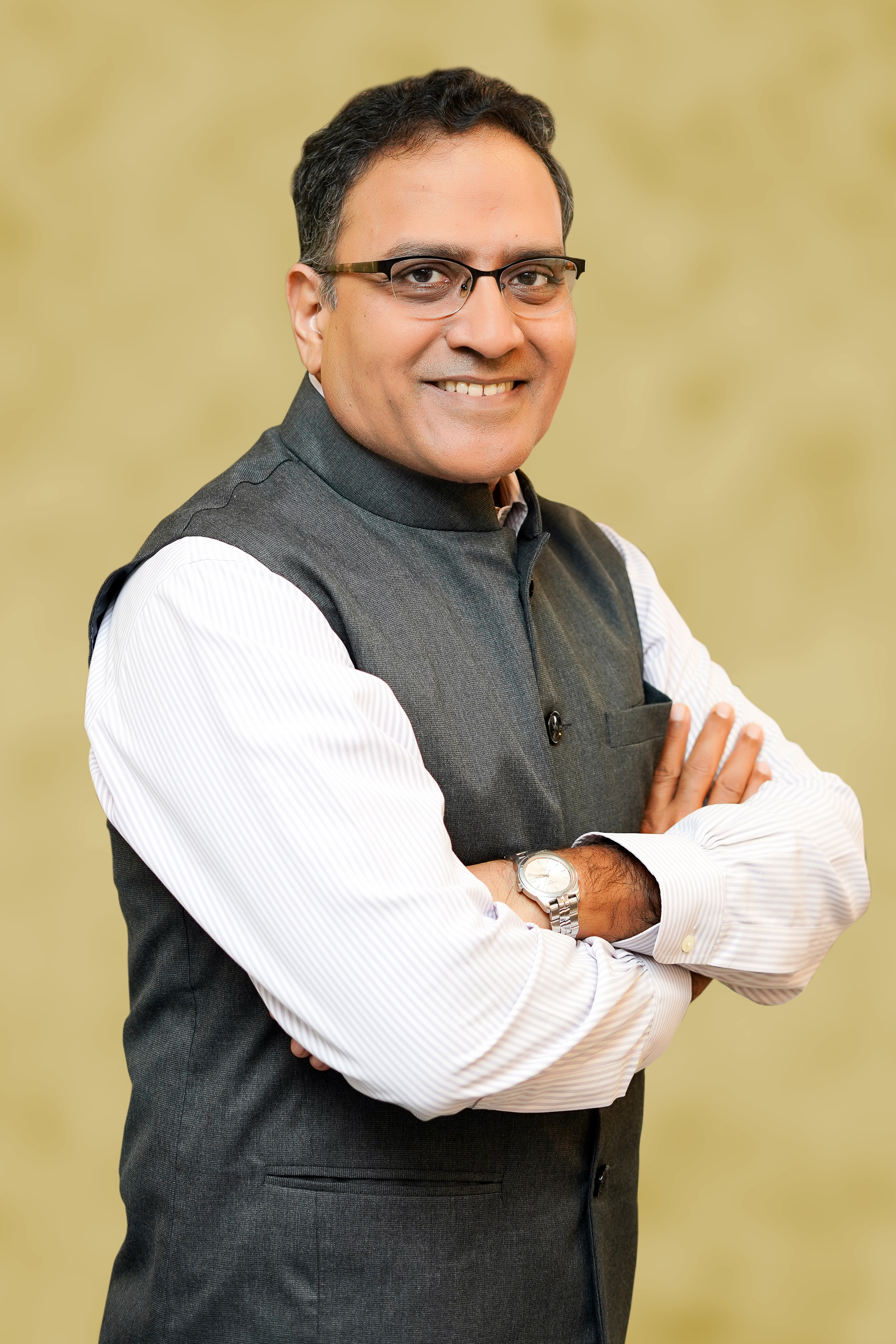

CEO, National Health Authority
- In office 1 February 2018 – 31 January 2021
- Preceded by: Position Established
- Succeeded by: Ram Sewak Sharma

Personal details
- Born: 6 January 1961 (age 65)
- Occupation: Former Civil servant, Economist
- Known for: Ayushman Bharat Pradhan Mantri Jan Arogya Yojna

Indu Bhushan (born 6 January 1961) is a former Indian bureaucrat and Economist. He was the first CEO of Ayushman Bharat, an Indian government agency providing national healthcare coverage to the low-income population of the country.

== Education and career ==
In 1983 Bhushan received B.Tech from Indian Institute of Technology (IIT-BHU) and Postgraduate Diploma from the Indian Institute of Technology Delhi. Bhushan graduated with a doctorate in economics and a master's degree in health science from Johns Hopkins University.

From 1983-92, Bhushan served as an Indian Administrative Service officer in the Rajasthan cadre before taking voluntary retirement. From 1994-96 he was with the World Bank. Bhushan held various appointments at the Asian Development Bank from 1997. In 2018, he accepted an appointment as CEO of Ayushman Bharat, an Indian government agency providing national healthcare coverage.

== Ayushman Bharat Yojana ==
In his role as CEO Ayushman Bharat, various media outlets have interviewed Bhushan about his plans for addressing the challenges which the Indian government faces in providing health care.

Bhushan said that the biggest difficulty for implementing Ayushman Bharat was rapidly increasing the number of available hospital beds in rural areas without greatly increasing the government's cost per bed.

At a talk hosted by the Federation of Indian Chambers of Commerce & Industry, Bhushan gave the opinion that the Indian government should increase its investment in healthcare. He also described that India could greatly advance its efficiency in healthcare through digital reform after the model of India adopting financial technology to improve finance in India. He emphasized that medical privacy for patients has to be secure for any health data. He compared the privacy and security of the Unified Payments Interface for his own plans in medicine through the National Digital Health Mission.

A year into running the Ayushman Bharat scheme, Bhushan again spoke of personal privacy in an interview. In another interview he described heavily he relied on technological development to achieve goals, while again stating the need for privacy.

== Recognition ==
In 2020, Bhushan received the Global Achievement Award from the alumni association of Johns Hopkins University, where he was a student.

== Family life ==
Indu Bhushan is married to Anjana Bhushan, a public health professional with expertise in human rights and gender. They have two daughters: Ambika Bhushan and Devika Bhushan, both physicians trained at Harvard Medical School. Devika Bhushan has served as Acting California Surgeon General (2022).

== Works ==
- Bennett, Sara; Bhushan, Indu (5 August 2020). "Public Health On Call: 130 - Dr. Indu Bhushan on COVID-19 and India's Publicly Funded Health Care System, PM-JAY". johnshopkinssph.libsyn.com. Johns Hopkins Bloomberg School of Public Health.
- Bhan, Shereen (18 August 2020). "In conversation with Indu Bhushan, the man in charge of National Health Digital Mission". cnbctv18.com. TV18.
- Borghijs, Alain; Bhushan, Indu (27 May 2015). "Innovatively using the Asian Development Bank's balance sheet to eradicate poverty". Brookings Institution. Brookings Institution.
