= Jeff Sheng =

American artist and photographer (born 2010)

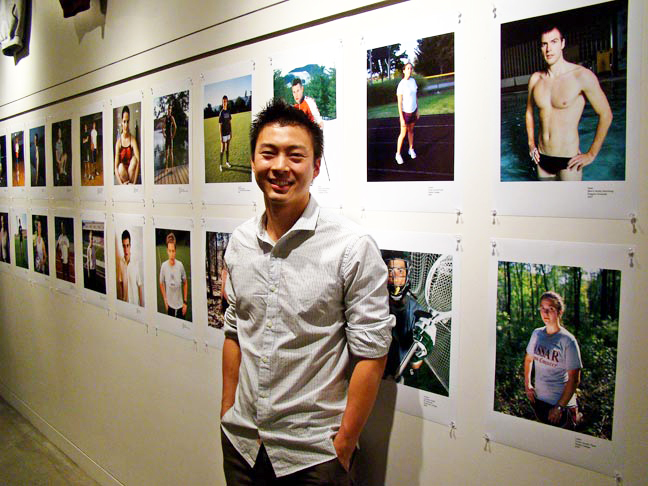
- Jeff Sheng, "Fearless" project exhibition, Drew School (High School), 2009
- Born: California, U.S.
- Education: Harvard University (BA); University of California, Irvine (MFA); Stanford University
- Occupation: Photographer
- Website: www.jeffsheng.com

Jeff Sheng (born California) is an American artist and photographer. He was a visiting guest professor of photography at Harvard University in 2011. He taught as a visiting assistant professor at the University of California, Santa Barbara for the departments of Studio Art and Asian American studies between 2007 and 2012. He is a recipient of The Paul & Daisy Soros Fellowships for New Americans.

== Education ==
Sheng attended Harvard University and studied under the mentorship of British photographer and Harvard professor Chris Killip in the Visual and Environmental Studies Department. For his senior thesis submitted to Harvard in 2002 for his BA degree, Sheng created a small photo album titled "Thesis Album," consisting of sixty 4" by 6" photographs of his personal same-sex relationship from college, with just half a page of writing. His senior thesis was awarded a Latin honors grade of summa cum laude, nominated for a Thomas T. Hoopes, Class of 1919, Prize, and Sheng was given the college's Louis Sudler Prize in the Arts by then President of Harvard University Lawrence Summers. In 2002 and 2003, Sheng interned for gallery owner and art curator WM Hunt (Bill Hunt) in New York City, and then briefly assisted for the celebrity/fashion photographer Greg Gorman in Los Angeles.

Sheng received his Master of Fine Arts (MFA) in Studio Art from the University of California, Irvine in 2007. His MFA Thesis Exhibition included a large forty foot wide by six foot high digitally constructed panoramic photographic installation, titled "Where Matthew Lay Dying: Laramie, Wyoming," originally shot and taken from the spot and vantage point where the hate crime/murder victim Matthew Shepard was found on a fence post outside Laramie, Wyoming.

Sheng is currently a doctoral PhD candidate in Sociology at Stanford University.

== Career ==
Sheng's photography work has been described as "historic" in capturing the social progress experienced by the LGBT community in the United States in the early 21st century.

His 2009-2011 photography series "Don't Ask, Don't Tell" documented almost 100 closeted LGBT United States military service members affected by the Don't ask, don't tell policy, that forbid United States military service members from openly identifying as gay or lesbian. Sheng's photographs of these closeted service members were widely published and reported on by the media during the Congressional repeal of the policy between 2010 and 2011, including in TIME Magazine, Newsweek, the New York Times, the Los Angeles Times, CNN, ABC World News, CBS Evening News, NPR, and the BBC News; and his photographs were extensively circulated among service members, military officials in the Pentagon, as well as members of Congress during the repeal process. Commenting about Sheng's work, Pulitzer Prize winning columnist Leonard Pitts wrote, "There is something sharply poignant in these images of those who do dangerous work most of us never have, make sacrifices most of us never will, yet are forced to hide their faces for fear of what it would mean if we knew who they are... The result was this stirring work that has been featured everywhere from the New York Times to the Los Angeles Times to CNN to the BBC."

On June 23, 2012, Sheng photographed the civil union of Will Behrens and air force service member Erwynn Umali, the first public same-sex wedding ceremony held on a United States military base and officiated by a military chaplain, since the official repeal of Don't ask, don't tell on September 20, 2011.

Sheng first became known for his photographic project "Fearless", a series of portraits of athletes on high school and college sports teams who also openly identify as gay, lesbian, bisexual or transgender. Sheng began the project in 2003, and by 2012, the series had over 150 portraits of athletes from the United States and Canada. Sheng has exhibited the project at over fifty colleges and high schools across the United States. "Fearless" has also been exhibited at the headquarters of sports media network ESPN, the 2009 LGBT Human Rights Conference in Copenhagen, Denmark, the 2010 Winter Olympics in Vancouver, Canada, and Nike World Headquarters.

For the 2012 Summer Olympics, Sheng released a 10-minute video slideshow of "Fearless" that was exhibited at Pride House 2012 as part of the London Olympics, which marked the debut of the project in Great Britain.

In August 2008, Sheng collaborated with former N.B.A. basketball player and fellow activist John Amaechi in Beijing, China during the 2008 Summer Olympics, on a blog in partnership with Amnesty International. Amaechi utilized Sheng's knowledge of Mandarin and previous experience as an American exchange student in Beijing to get behind the scenes in many situations and to gather candid interviews with local people and Olympic athletes.

In 2004, Sheng photographed Evan Wolfson and Mary Bonauto for The New York Times Magazine for an in-depth article written by David J. Garrow about the struggle over the legalization of same-sex marriage in Massachusetts and the United States.
