= Surgeon General of California =

Public health official in California, US

Surgeon General of the State of California
- Seal of the State of California
- Incumbent; Diana Ramos, MD appointed August 25, 2022
- Reports to: Governor of California
- Appointer: Governor Gavin Newsom
- Formation: January 7, 2019
- First holder: Nadine Burke Harris, MD
- Salary: $216,420

The Surgeon General of California is the leading spokesperson on matters of public health within the State of California. The Surgeon General is one of only six State Surgeons General in the United States.

The office was created on January 7, 2019, by Governor Gavin Newsom.

The first Surgeon General was Nadine Burke Harris, who served from February 11, 2019 to February 11, 2022. On August 25, 2022, Governor Gavin Newsom appointed Diana Ramos, MD as the current California Surgeon General and she continues to serve in the position.

== History ==
The Surgeon General of California was first created with the signing of Executive Order N-02-19, one of the first acts taken by Governor Gavin Newsom on his first day in office on January 7, 2019.

Governor Newsom appointed Dr. Nadine Burke Harris as California's first-ever surgeon general.

On August 25, 2022, Governor Gavin Newsom appointed Diana Ramos, MD as Surgeon General.

== List of Surgeons General of California ==
#	Image	Name	Service	Prior offices
1		Nadine Burke Harris	February 11, 2019 – February 11, 2022	none
2	Dr. Diana E. Ramos, CA Surgeon General	Diana Ramos	September 1, 2022 – Present	California Department of Public Health- Assistant Deputy Director of Chronic Disease Prevention
