= Jayen Mehta =

Indian business executive

Managing Director of Gujarat Co-operative Milk Marketing Federation
- Incumbent
- Assumed office January 2023
- Preceded by: RS Sodhi

Chief operating officer of GCMMF
- In office February 2022 – January 2023

Personal details
- Education: BBA, PGDRM
- Alma mater: Sardar Patel University; Institute of Rural Management Anand

Jayen Mehta is an Indian business executive. He serves as the managing director at the Gujarat Co-operative Milk Marketing Federation Ltd (GCMMF), the largest food product marketing organization in India and a cooperative society, known for its brand Amul. Prior to this, Mehta held the position of Chief Operating Officer of Amul. He also serves as the Chairman of Sahakar Taxi Cooperative Limited, which runs the government-backed Bharat Taxi service.

Businessworld magazine named him in the list of Influential Marketing Leaders of India 2021 and was also included in the 'Powerful Influencer 2020' list by India TV.

== Early life and education ==
Mehta completed his Bachelor of Business Administration in Marketing from BJ Vanijya Mahavidyalaya in Gujarat in 1989. He is a gold medalist from Sardar Patel University. He did his post-graduation at the Institute of Rural Management Anand (IRMA) in Gujarat.

== Career ==
He has been associated with Amul since 1991, where he held various positions such as brand manager, group product manager, and general manager.

Mehta also served as the in-charge Managing Director of Amul Dairy in Anand, Gujarat for a brief period from April 2018 to September 2018. Mehta served as the Chief General Manager of GCMMF.

In February 2022, he was appointed as the Chief Operating Officer of GCMMF. He also serves as the GCMMF nominee on the boards of Mehsana, Sabarkantha, Banaskantha, Panchmahal, and Valsad milk unions. He was made the managing director of Amul in January 2023, succeeding RS Sodhi. He received a five-year extension as Managing Director of Amul in December 2024.

Mehta is credited with transforming Amul from a largely traditional company into a marketing-focused organization and expanding its presence across India as well as in the United States and Europe. He also directed the modernization of Amul's legacy supply chain, implementing a hub-and-spoke distribution model to ensure the nationwide availability of the brand's complete product line.

Mehta is a member of the Standing Committee on Marketing for the International Dairy Federation (IDF). He is a member of the Confederation of Indian Industry' Committee on International Trade Policy and has served on the Global Dairy Trade Events Oversight Board.

In 2025, he joined the board of the Global Dairy Platform and was appointed to the Circle of Cooperative and Mutual Leaders (CM50), a leadership forum under the International Cooperative Alliance.

In September 2025, Jayen Mehta was nominated to the board of the India Brand Equity Foundation, a trust of the Department of Commerce to promote 'Brand India' globally. He was elected Chairman of Bharat Taxi (Sahakar Taxi Cooperative Limited), a cooperative ride-hailing services, in October 2025.

== Awards and recognition ==
In 2021, he was named among India's Most Influential Marketing Leaders by BW Businessworld magazine. He was also honored with the Marketer of the Year - FMCG Food award by the India Chapter of the International Advertising Association (IAA).

In 2021, Jayen Mehta was awarded the Best CMO Award by Pitch and Exchange4Media. He was also included in the CMO Super 30 Honor Roll by the Internet and Mobile Association of India (IAMAI) in 2020. He has been listed in India TV's “Powerful Influencer 2020” list. In 2018, he received the Marketing Man of the Year Award from the Ahmedabad Management Association.

In August 2023, the Indian chapter of the International Advertising Association (IAA) recognized him as the Marketer of the Year in the FMCG Food category. The Hindu Business Line awarded him the 2023 Iconic Changemaker Award.

He was included in Campaign Asia's "Asia Pacific Power List" in 2024 and 2025, which profiles influential marketers in the region. In 2025, the International Advertising Association India Chapter named Mehta 'IAA Leader of the Year' in the FMCG segment at the IAA Leadership Awards.

== See also ==
- Verghese Kurien
- Harichand Megha Dalaya
