= Banas Dairy =

Dairy in Palanpur, Gujarat, India

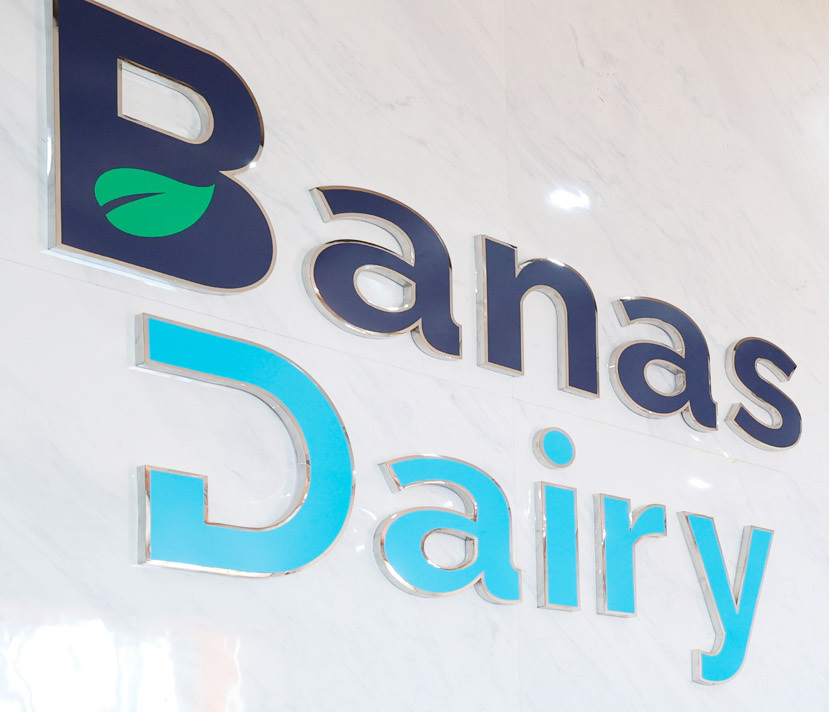

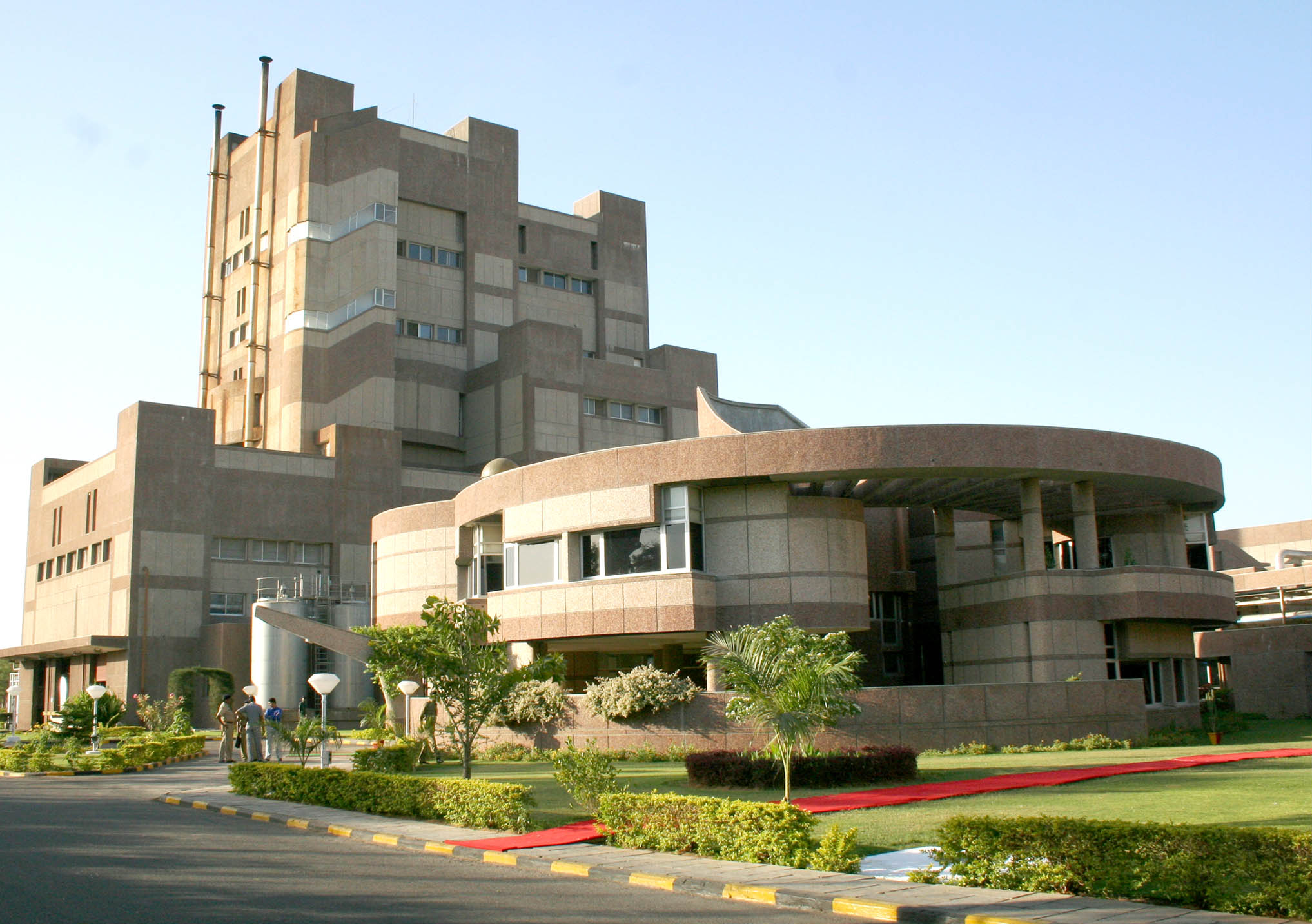
- Banas Dairy
- Type: Division of Gujarat Cooperative Milk Marketing Federation
- Industry: Milk and milk items
- Founded: 1969
- Headquarters: Palanpur, Gujarat, India
- Key people: Shankar Chaudhary (Chairman); Bhavabhai Rabari (Vice Chairman); Shri Sangramsingh R Chaudhary (I/C MD)
- Revenue: ▲INR₹ 18,255 crore (2021–22)
- Owner: Gujarat Cooperative Milk Marketing Federation, Ministry of Cooperation, Government of Gujarat
- Number of employees: 5000
- Website: banasdairy.coop

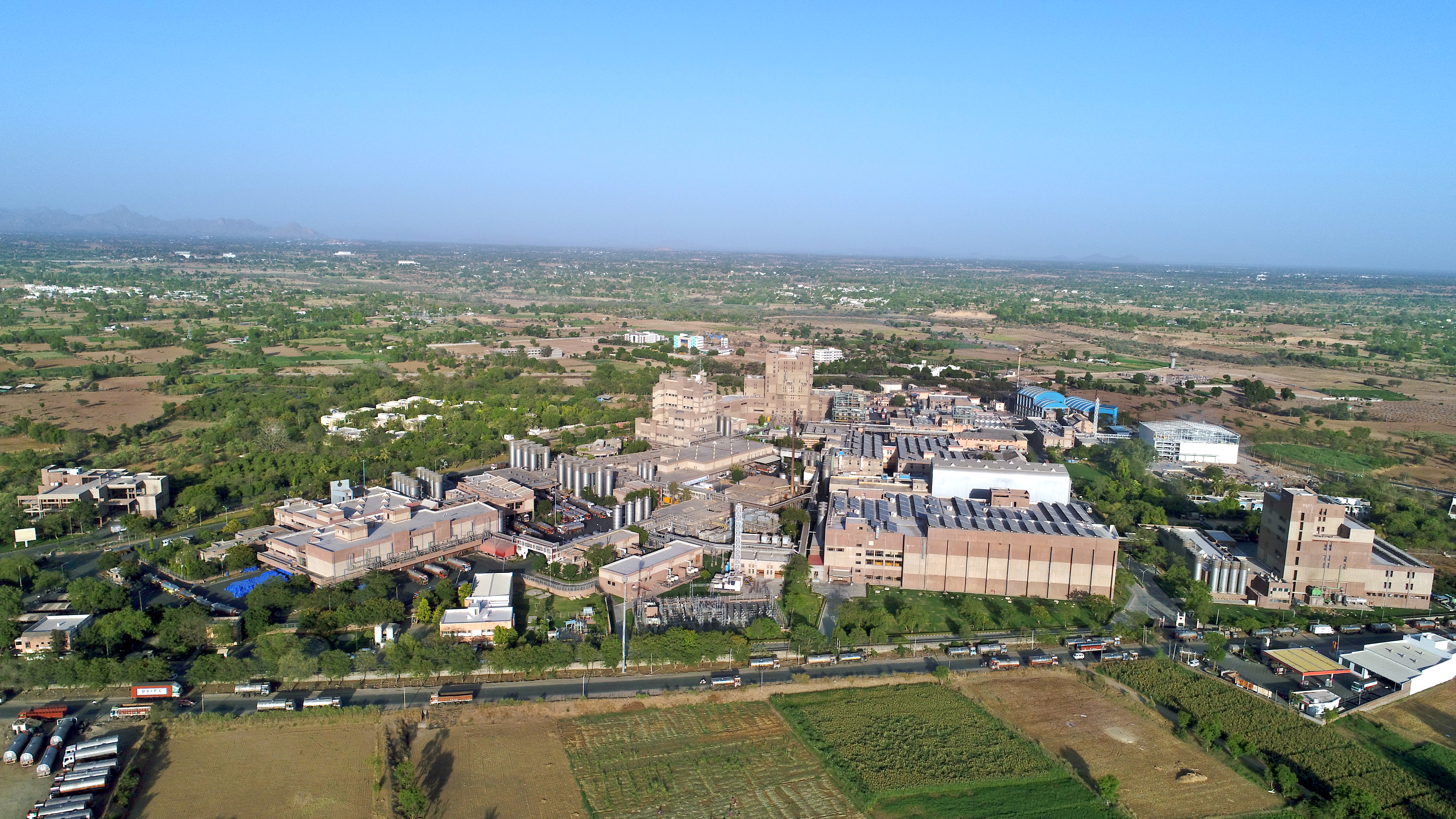

Banas Dairy (Gujarati: બનાસ ડેરી) (Banaskantha District Cooperative Milk Federation, Palanpur) is a division of Gujarat Cooperative Milk Marketing Federation which is registered under the Gujarat State Co-op Act 1961 and ownership lies with the milk pourers. Based in the Banaskantha district of Gujarat, India, and is Asia's largest milk producer cooperative. It was founded in 1969, in accordance with the 1961 rule of the National Dairy Development Board under Operation Flood. Galbabhai Nanjibhai Patel played an important role in the foundation of the dairy. It is headquartered at Palanpur.

Banas Dairy collects an average of around 8.3 million liters of milk every day. In winter, milk collection increases to 10 million liters of milk every day.

The company's products are marketed by Gujarat Cooperative Milk Marketing Federation, Anand, and it is currently largest member union of the latter.

Banas Dairy has 20,00,00 shareholders, which are spread across 1,750 cooperative societies. Till year 2014 it was procuring milk from more than 0.35 million milk producers of Banaskantha district of Gujarat and measuring approximately 3.3 million liters of milk per day in Gujarat state.

== History ==
In March 2021, Banaskantha District Co-operative Milk Producers Union Limited (BDCMPUL), popularly known as Banas Dairy, has inaugurated a buttermilk packaging plant set up with an investment of ₹10.30 crore. Present capacity of the plant is a packaging capacity of two lakh litres buttermilk.

In September 2020, considering the growing demand for potato-based products across the world, Banas Dairy is planning to establish a Rs 100-crore potato processing unit in North Gujarat. The unit is planned to be set up in Banaskantha district in Northern Gujarat which is known for potato farming and the unit is planned to produce 50,000 metric tonnes of potatoes is focused for producing French fries and other 12 other potato products for catering both domestic and international markets in the Southeast Asia annually. The civil work for the project has already begun and the machinery for the plant is planned to be imported from Netherlands and the production is targeted to begin by October 2021. Currently, Banas Dairy is one of the 18 cooperative unions operating under the Gujarat Cooperative Milk Marketing Federation (GCMMF) and procures around 7,000 metric tonnes of potatoes from 500 odd farmers and manufacturers potato-based products at a hired unit in North Gujarat.

In April 2025, Prime Minister Narendra Modi praised Banas Dairy for its work in the dairy sector.

== Plants ==
- Banas Dairy currently has four running dairy plants (LLPD indicates Lakh Litres Per Day, MTPD indicates Metric Tons Per Day)
  - Palanpur
    Banas – I Plant Capacity – 7 LLPD
    Banas – II Plant Capacity – 24 LLPD
    Banas – III Plant Capacity – 18 LLPD
    Cheese Plant Capacity – 900 MTPD
    Haryana
    Faridabad Plant Capacity – 10 LLPD-The foundation stone was laid in February 2014 with a planned investment of Rs 300 crores. The processing capacity for initial years is one million litres per day (lpd) and expandable up to 1.5 million lpd.
    Lucknow
    Lucknow Plant Capacity – 5-10 LLPD– In year 2014, Banaskantha District Co-operative Milk Producer's Union Ltd (Banas Dairy) has planned to open a plant of 0.5 million lpd each in Lucknow soon.
    Kanpur
    Kanpur Plant Capacity – 5-10 LLPD– In year 2014, Banaskantha District Co-operative Milk Producer's Union Ltd (Banas Dairy) has planned to open a plant of 0.5 million lpd in Kanpur soon.
- Banas Dairy currently has two running cattle feed plants
  - Katarva
    Katarva Plant is Asia's largest cattle feed plant. It has a capacity of 1800 MTPD
    Palanpur
    Palanpur plant has a capacity of 700 MTPD

== Timeline ==
- 3 October 1966 – Registered 8 Village level Co-operative Societies in vadgam and Palanpur Taluka Besides Started Sending milk at Dudhsagar Dairy Mehsana.
- 31 January 1969 – The Banaskantha District Co-operative milk producer Union Limited (Banas Dairy) got registered under co-operative law.
- 1 November 1969 – Beginning of collecting and sending milk at Dudhsagar Dairy Mehsana through milk Union.
- 14 January 1971 – The foundation stone was laid down for feeder Balancing Dairy by the founder chairman late Galbabhai N. patel at 122 acre land purchased Near jagana village
- 7 May 1971 – Banas Dairy (pilot Chilling plant) started functioning.
- 17 June 1972 – Khimana milk chilling center commenced functioning.
- 17 October 1972 – Dhanera milk chilling center commenced functioning.
- 14 April 1974 – Animal Husbandry services started functioning
- 26 January 1975 – Commencement of Skim milk Powder production. 5 July 1977 – Production Commenced at Feed Milling Plant (100MT\Day).
- 4 February 1979 – foundation stone laid down for dairy plant expansion by Verghese Kurien, Chairman of GCMMF Ltd. Anand, Chairman National Dairy Development Board and IDC
- 4 February 1979 – Feed milling plant inaugurated by Shri Surjit Singh Barnala, Cabinet Minister (GOI) For Agriculture and irrigation
- 4 February 1979 – statue of founder chairman Shri Galbabhai N.patel unveiled by Babubhai J. Patel, Chief Minister of Gujarat.
- 14 March 1979 – Tharad milk chilling center commenced functioning
- 17 March 1980 – Commencement of dispatching milk to Mother Dairy Delhi through rail milk tanker.
- 1 November 1983 – Danta milk chilling center started functioning.
- 8 October 1984 – Galbabhai Dairy Co-operative Training Center made functioning.
- 1 November 1984 – Radhanpur milk chilling center started functioning.
- 14 September 1986 – Excellence award for cross bred cow received at 21st ida conference.
- 9 December 1986 – Amulya milk powder production commenced.
- 1 July 1989 – Co-operative Development Program commenced.
- 1 October 1993 – New powder plant of 30 TPD started production.
- 7 May 1994 – Silver jubilee function was organised and inauguration of 30 TPD powder plant done by Hon. Agri.Minister Shri Balram Jakhar. Government of India.
- 2 October 1998 – Foundation stone of Banas -II project was laid by padma vibhushan Verghese Kurien, former chairman of National Dairy Development Board and chairman of GCMMF Ltd.
- 15 June 1999 – Banas Dairy was awarded ISO 9002 and HACCP certification.
- 13 February 2001 – First consignment of whole milk powder exported to Oman
- 20 September 2001 – Trial run of 60 TPD powder plant in Banas-II
- 10 May 2003 – production of ice cream
- 1 September 2003 – Tetra pack milk packing inaugurated by Shri BM Vyas MD, GCMMF Ltd.
- 23 September 2004 – Bhumi Pujan at Dama for AH complex
- 24 September 2004 – Inauguration of AMUL parlor at Danta by Shri BM Vyas, MD, GCMMF Ltd.
- 24 August 2005 – AMUL Kool liquid sterilized flavored milk Launched
- 23 August 2006 – Kanpur milk packing & Marketing Started
- 9 February 2007 – Dhudh Sanjeevani Scheme dedicated to people by Chief Minister of Gujarat Shri Narendra Modi.
- 24 March 2007 – Inauguration of Banas II Dairy Complex by Union Agri. Minister shri Sharad pawar.
- 24 November 2007 – Unveiling of the statue of Late Galbabhai N.Patel Founder chairman of Banas Dairy by chief Minister of Gujarat, Shri Narendra Modi.
- 1 August 2007 – Semen Freezing at semen collection Station, dama started
- 24 November 2007 – Milk packaging and selling started at Jaipur
- 7 August 2010 – Foundation stone of Banas III Dairy Complex and Inauguration of cattle Feed plant by chief Minister of Gujarat, Shri Narendra Modi.
- 21 February 2009 – Inauguration of the Semen collection station Dama and 1000 MT cattle Feed plant at Katarva by Dr. Amrita Patel, chairman, National Dairy Development Board
- 9 June 2009 – pilot project of paneer production started
- 15 August 2010 – a record in mass tree plantation drive organized under the auspices of GCMMF Ltd. by planting 16.37 lac trees across villages of the district
- 11 February 2011 – historical milk train started from Palanpur to Kanpur carrying milk and milk products
- 1 April 2011 – Banas dairy Education Research and Development, a trust of Banas Dairy started functioning
- 1 April 2011 – inauguration of swavlamban-National pension scheme – first initiative in the country.
- 18 May 2011 – pilot project on Cheese production started
- 28 June 2011 – inauguration of Banas III Dairy Complex and Foundation stone laid of 100 MT Milk Powder Plant by Chief Minister of Gujarat, Shri Narendra Modi.
- 28 December 2011 – high speed Tetra pack Milk packing line started.
- 25 April 2016 – new cheese plant at palanpur started with capacity of 900 metric ton per month.
- In July 2017, It was reported that Banas Dairy will replicate Gujarat milk cooperative model in UP

== Awards ==
- 1992-1993 – Best Performance Year in Productivity – Dairy Development & Production in Co-operative Sector (Product Plant) by Dr. Balram Jakhar, Union Minister of Agriculture at New Delhi.
- 1993-1994 – Performance in Productivity – Dairy Processing Industries – by Dr.Shankar Dayal Sharma President of India at New Delhi.
- 1993-1994 – The second Best Performance in Productivity – Dairy Development and Production in Cooperative and Public Sector (Product Plant) by Dr.Shankar Dayal Sharma President of India at New Delhi.
- 1996-1997 – The best Productivity Performance-Dairy Processing Industries -by Sikander Bakht, Minister of Industries at New Delhi.
- 1997-1998 – The Second Best Performance in Productivity – Dairy Processing Industry By Krishan Kant, Vice President of India at New Delhi.
- 1999-2000 – The second best Productivity Performance – Dairy Processing Industry by Shri Arun Jaitley, Cabinet Minister of Commerce and Industry At New Delhi.
- 2000-2001 – The best Productivity Performance – Dairy Processing Industry by Shri Arun Jaitley.
- 2001-2002 – The second best Productivity Performance-Dairy Processing Industry by Shri Arun Jaitley.
- 2003-2004 – The best Productivity Performance – Dairy Processing Industry (Large Unit)– by Subodh Kant Sahay, Minister of State for Food Processing Industry on 26 August 2005.
- 2004-2005 – The Productivity Performance-Dairy Processing Industry (Large Unit) by Subodh Kant Sahay, Minister of State for Food Processing Industry on 19 March 2008.
- 2009 – Received Commendation Certificate of the prestigious Rajiv Gandhi National Quality Award (RGNQA) in large manufacturing category for the year 2008 given away by Prof. K V Thomas, Minister of State.
- 2010 – The Quality Council of India, New Delhi gave away D.L. Shah quality, Award to Banas Dairy.
- 2011 – Chief Minister of Gujarat Shri Narendra Modi Gave away Award to Banas Dairy for planting 6 lacs tree in collaboration with District Administration on 15 August 2010.
- 2020 – Awarded with the 'Amul Green Award' for its work on environment conservation and preservation.

== Gallery ==
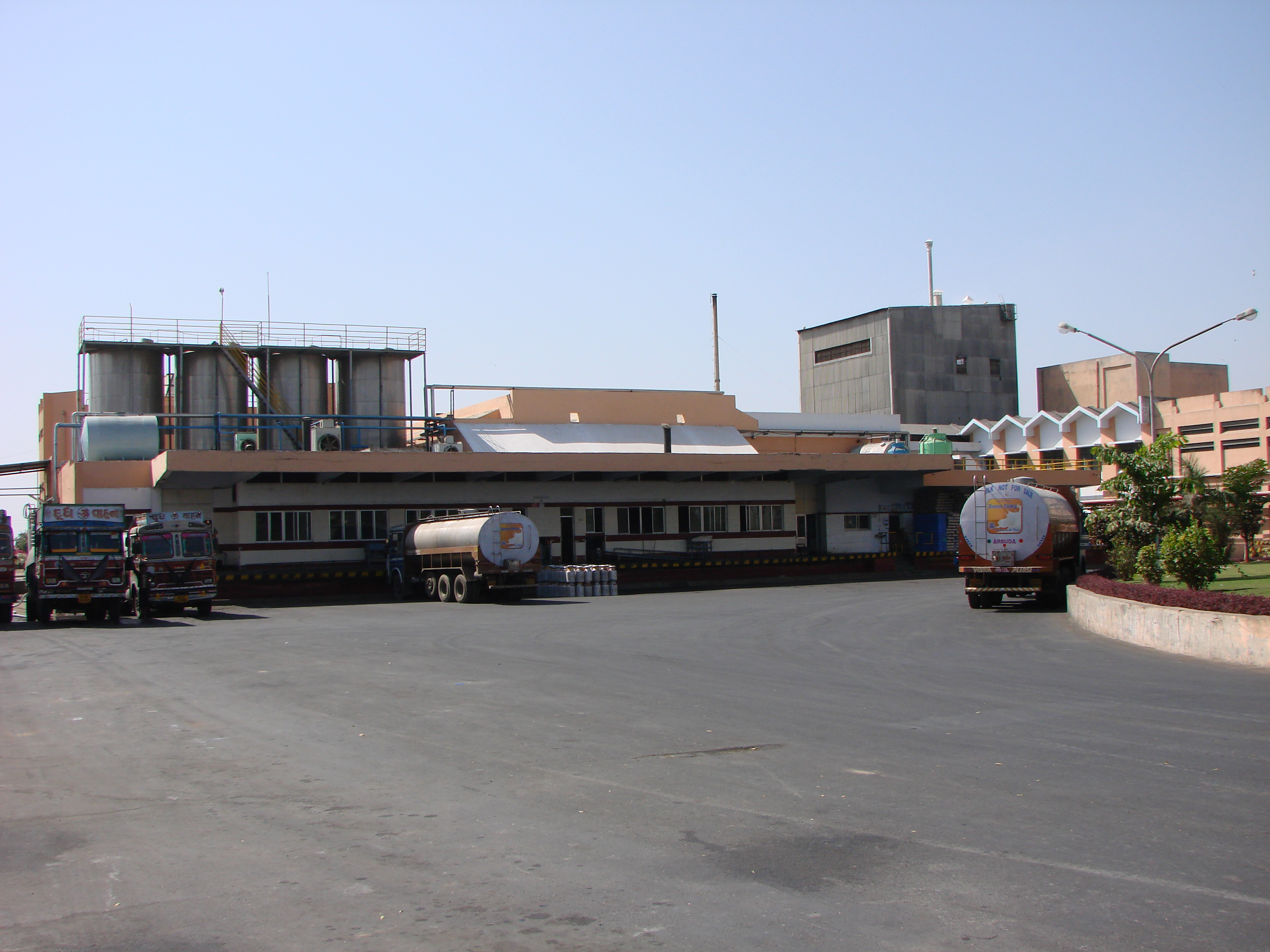
Banas – 1 Plant
At Palanpur

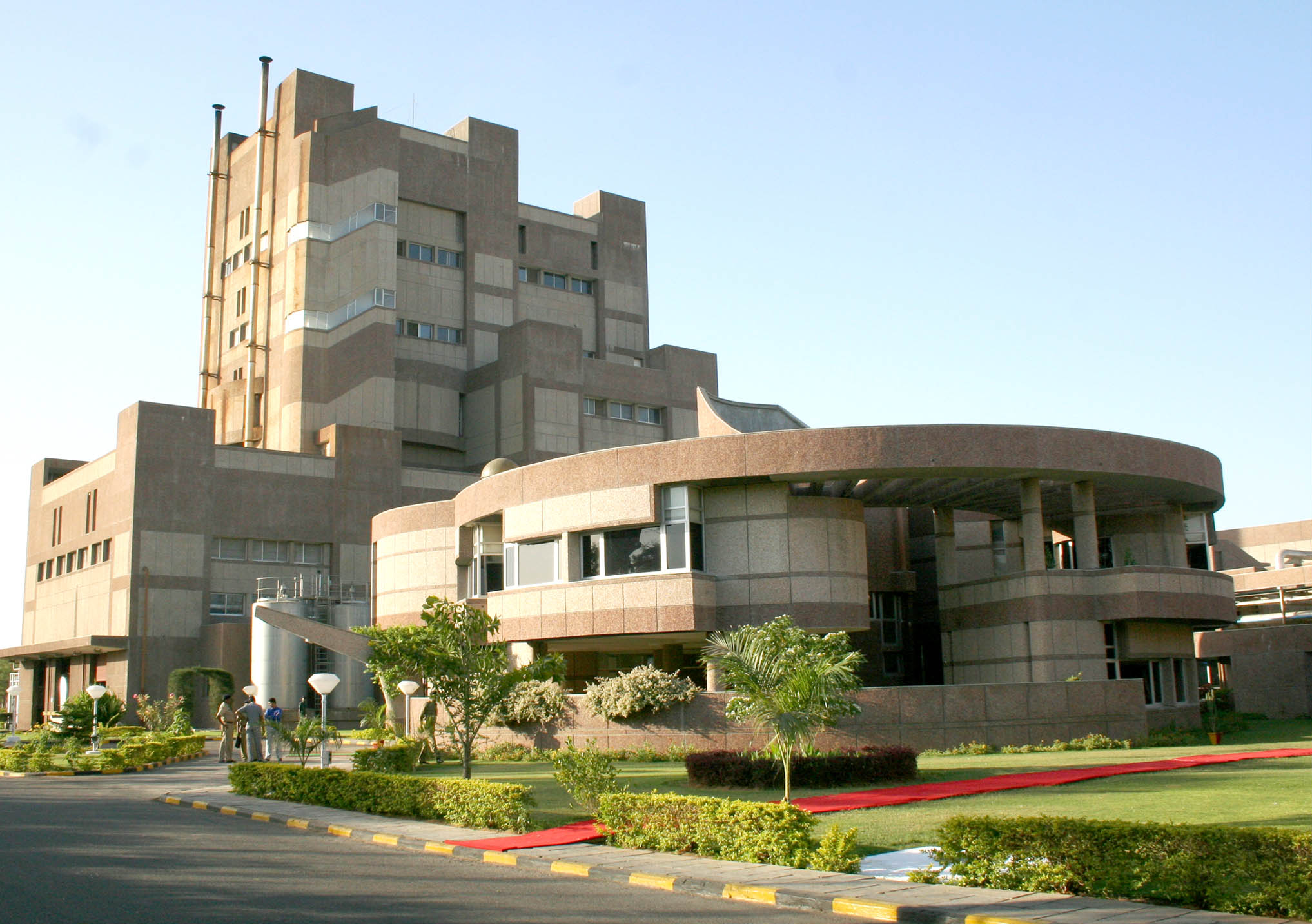
Banas – 2 Plant
At Palanpur

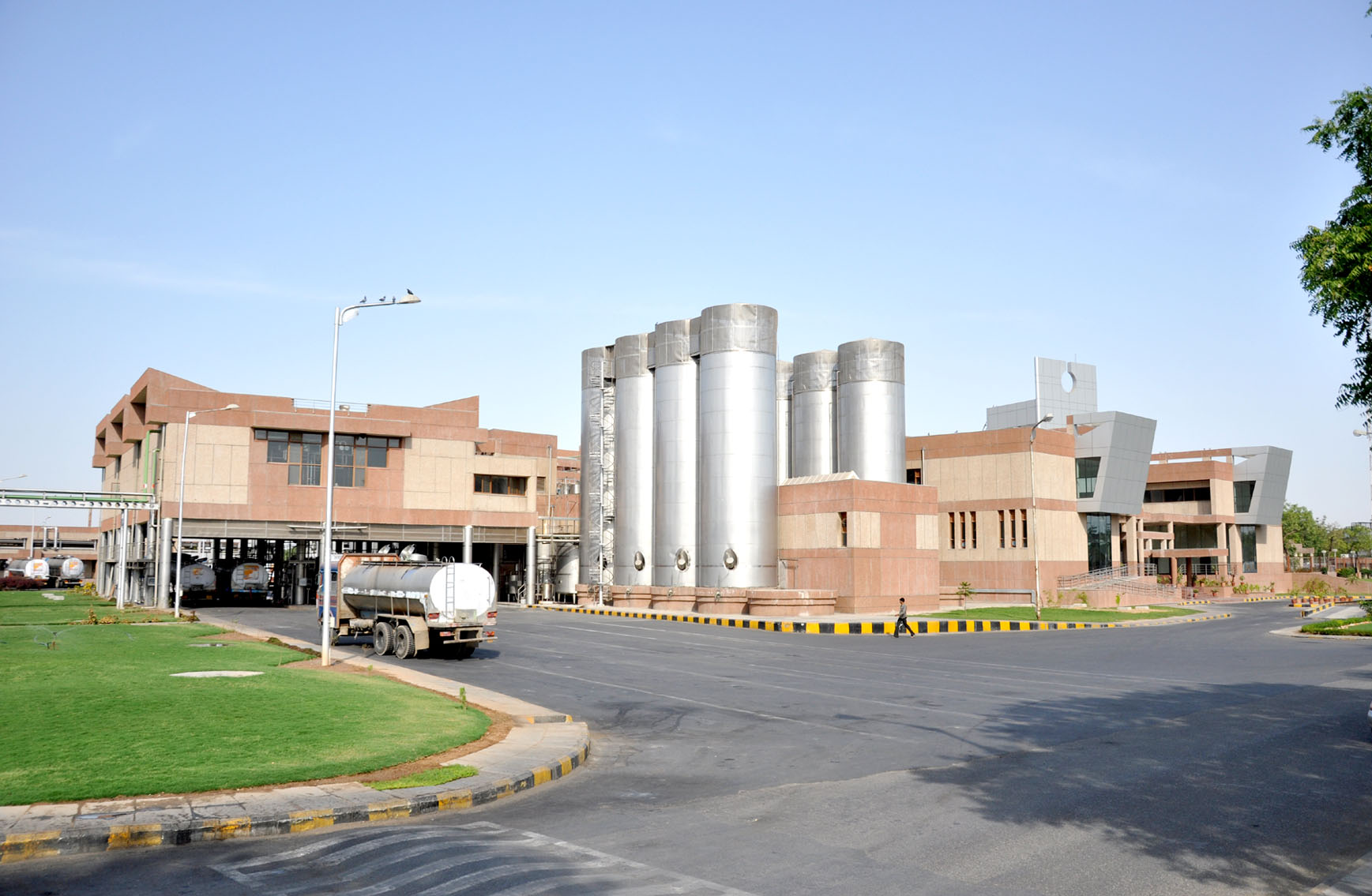
Banas – 3 Plant
At Palanpur

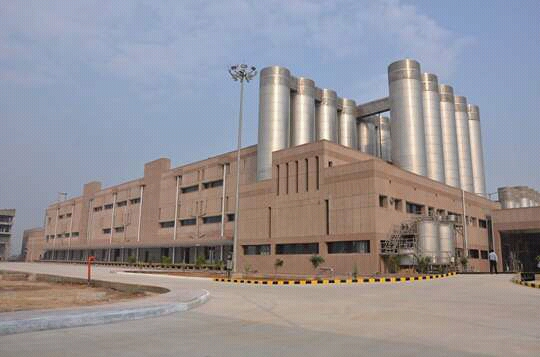
Banas Dairy Plant
At Faridabad
