= Amrita Patel =

Indian businessperson

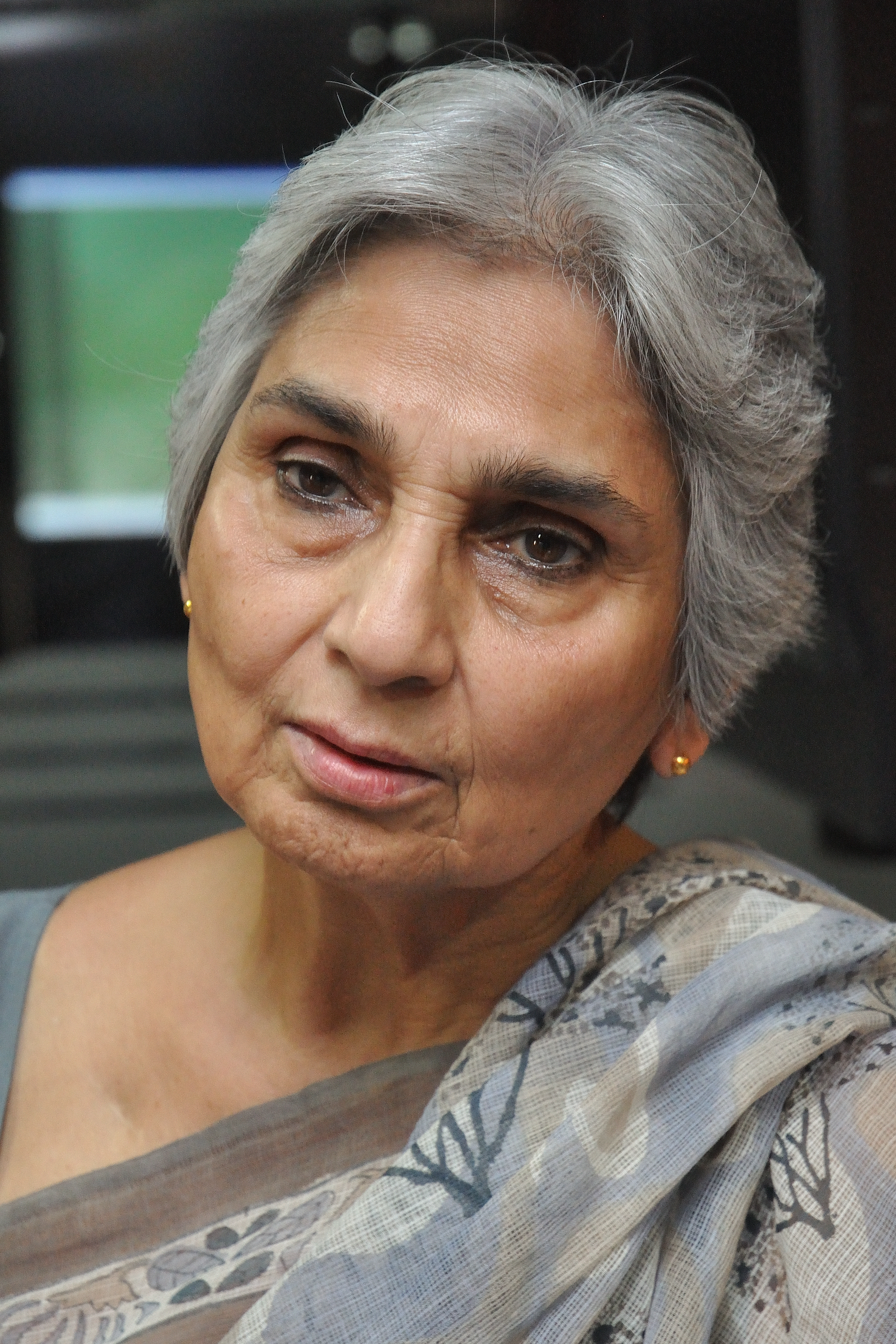
- Patel in 2016
- Born: 13 November 1943 (age 82); New Delhi, British India
- Occupation: Businessperson
- Father: Hirubhai M. Patel
- Awards: Padma Bhushan (2001)

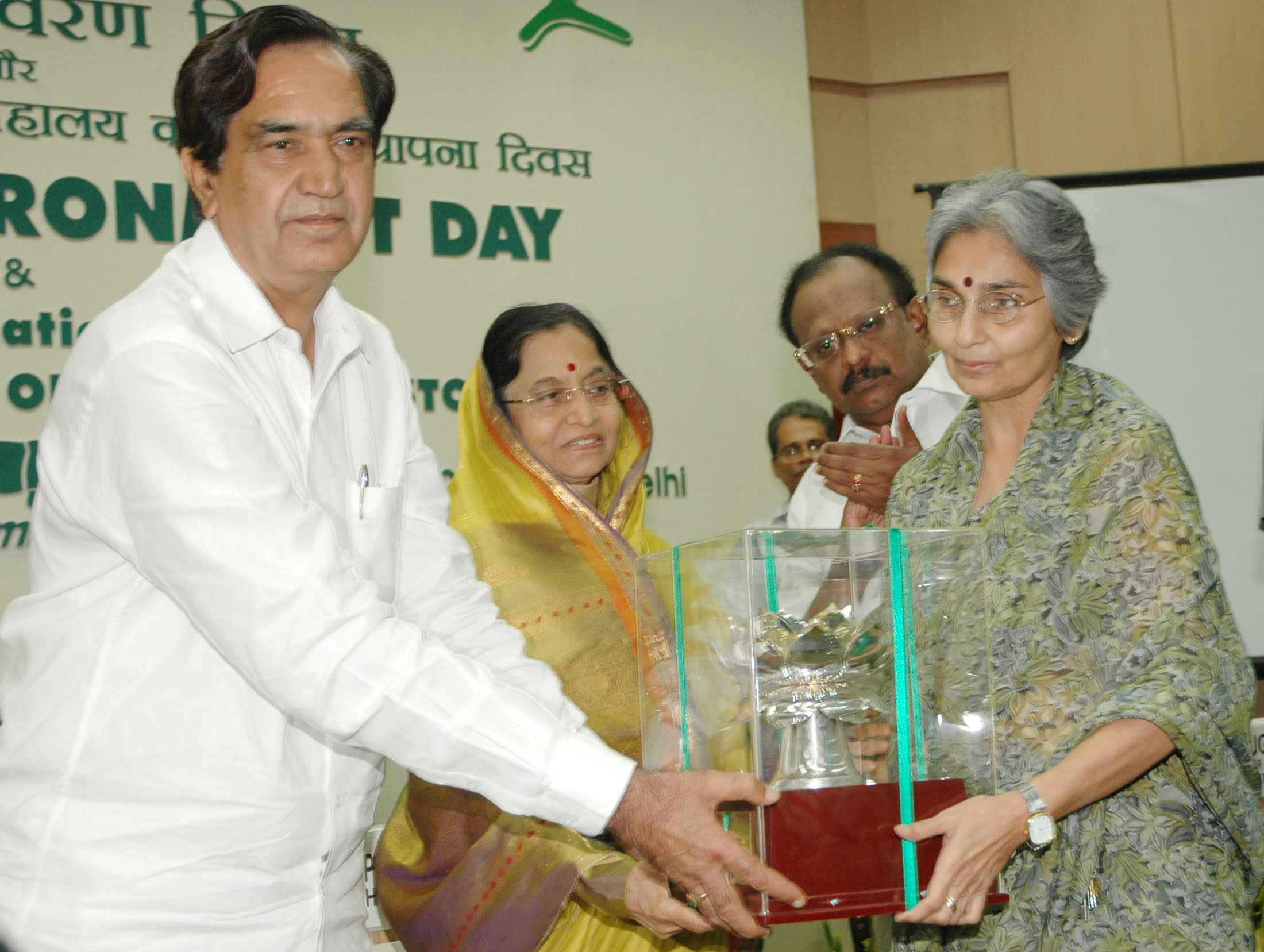
The President of India Pratibha Patil presenting the Indira Gandhi Paryavaran Puraskar (2005) to Amrita Patel at the World Environment Day 2008 and 30th Year of the Foundation of National Museum of Natural History

Amrita Patel (born 1943) is an Indian businessperson associated with the cooperative dairy sector as well as an environmentalist. She headed the National Dairy Development Board from 1998 to 2014 which led the world's biggest dairy development program Operation Flood. She chaired several other institutes and has been a member of board of banks. She was awarded the Padma Bhushan in 2001.

== Early life ==
Amrita Patel was born on 13 November 1943 at 1, Safdarjung Road, New Delhi. She was the youngest among five daughters of civil servant and politician Hirubhai M. Patel and Savitaben, a Gujarati family. When her father retired, her family moved back to Anand in Gujarat in 1959. She received her higher education from Mumbai and completed her study in Bachelor of Veterinary Science and Animal Husbandry. In 1965, she joined Amul, a dairy cooperative, and was trained under Verghese Kurien.

== Career ==
After four decades of work in Amul, she served as the chairperson of the National Dairy Development Board (NDDB) in from 1998 to 2014. As the managing director of NDDB, she led Operation Flood, the world's biggest dairy development program.

She also became a chairperson of Mother Dairy, Delhi; the President of Indian National Committee of the International Dairy Federation and later a member of Planning Commission of Government of Himachal Pradesh. She has been a member of the Boards of the Reserve Bank of India and the National Bank for Agriculture and Rural Development (NABARD).

She advocates the protection of environment and ecology. She was the chairperson of the Foundation for Ecological Security working in the field of ecology. She is the Chairman of the Sardar Patel Renewable Energy Research Institute, Anand, as well as Charutar Arogya Mandal.

== Recognition ==
She was awarded various awards for her contribution in development and management of dairy sector including the Financial Express Lifetime Achievement Award, Jawaharlal Nehru Birth Centenary Award for Nation Building (1999–2000), World Dairy Expo's International Person of the Year (1997), Indian Dairy Association Fellowship, Krishimitra Award, Foundation National Award from Fuel Injection Engineering Company, Sahkarita Bandhu Award, Borlaug Award (1991), Indira Gandhi Paryavaran Puraskar (2005), Mahindra Samriddhi Krishi Shiromani Samman (Lifetime Achievement Award, 2016).

The Government of India awarded her the Padma Bhushan, the third highest civilian award of India, in 2001.
