= Chikhodra =

- Village
- Location in Gujarat, India Chikhodra (India)
- Coordinates: 22°34′N 73°0′E
- Country: India
- State: Gujarat
- District: Anand
- Elevation: 35 m (115 ft)

Population (2008)
  - Total: 10,000

Languages
  - Official: Gujarati, Hindi
- Time zone: UTC+5:30 (IST)
- PIN: 388320
- Telephone code: 02692
- Vehicle registration: GJ-23
- Nearest city: Anand
- Sex ratio: 100:96 ♂/♀
- Literacy: 80%
- Website: www.chikhodra.org

Chikhodra is a village situated in Anand district in the state of Gujarat, India. It is administered by Chikhodra Gram Panchayat and the Anand Municipality. It is a member of the Bavis gaam Patidar Samaj (collaboration of 22 villages). It is a part of the region known as Charotar, comprising Anand and Kheda Districts. With recent Real-estate developments it is on its way on becoming an important suburb of the Anand City.

Chikhodra is famous for its tobacco production and manufacturing. It comprises more than 20 individual tobacco manufacturing companies-major being S.J.Patel, M.B.Patel & sons, A.A.& co., M.M.& sons, and several others. Chikhodra is also an important milk producer and contributor to the Amul Dairy in Anand.

Chikhodra lies on National Highway No. 8 between two important cities of Ahmedabad and Vadodara. It is 20 km from Dakor, a major Hindu pilgrimage en route. The National Express highway 1 from Ahmedabad to Vadodara also passes through Chikhodra.

Chikhodra has recently seen rapid real estate development with the economic growth of the Anand City. With Chikhodra's collaboration with Anand city and other villages, Anand is well on track to becoming a Municipal Corporation..

== Geography ==
Chikhodra is located at 22°33'54"N/73°0'5"E. It has an average elevation of 35 meters(115 feet).

== Demographics ==
As of 2008 India census, Chikhodra had a population of 10,423. Males constitute 51% of the population and females 49%. Chikhodra has an average literacy rate of 80%, higher than the national average of 60% (53% of the males and 47% of the females). 10% of the population is under the age of 6.

== Education ==
Diwali Ba Balmandir

"Diwali Ba Balmandir" is a kindergarten school in Chikhodra. It contains both English and Gujarati medium classes. The teachers are highly educated and well experienced.

M.M. & Sons High School

Education in Chikhodra is provided by various institutes of Anand City and its educational suburb Vallabh Vidhyanagar. The village of Chikhodra provides free public education from 1 to 7 standards. With that, Chikhodra also has high school till 12th standard with Arts and Commerce fields. Mr Jayantibhai I Parmar is the English teacher serving from the last 28 years.

== Transport ==
National Highway (NH) 8 connects Chikhodra with smaller towns and villages offering excellent, affordable and rapid transport service for business, education and leisure. The Gujarat express highway offers a rapid transport service to Ahmadabad, Vadodara and Nadiad.

Myrid of Gujarat State Transport buses connects Chikhodra to other villages and major cities of Gujarat. Within the village, a limited service transport is offered by auto rickshaws served by dedicated and reliable drivers. The well developed roads of the village allows its people to reach their destination within minutes.

== Industries ==
Tobacco Manufacturing Companies

Chikhodra is famous for its tobacco production and manufacturing. Chikhodra consists of more than 20 individual tobacco manufacturing companies. Some of the important Industries include Shanabhai Jibhaibhai Patel & Co.,Gordhanbhai Ashabhai Patel Mukhi Company, M.B.Patel & sons, A.A. & Co., M.M. & Sons, B.C.Patel &Coand several others.

Anand Food and Dairy Products, Chikhodra, Anand, Gujarat, India

Apart from Tobacco industries it also consists of 'Anand Food and Dairy Products' whose food products are provided for NRIs, Non Residence Indians, all over the world. 'Anand Food and Dairy Products' also produce beverages with their famous and Traditional Gujarati "Keri no Rash" (The Mango Pulp).

Anand Regional Co-operative oil seeds Grower's Union started as a small co-operative in Chikhodra village in 1969 near Anand, to help the cottonseed growers of this area.

== Hospitals and Health Care ==
Shri Ravisankar Maharaj Eye Hospital, Chikhodra, Anand, Gujarat, India

"Shri Ravisankar Maharaj Eye Hospital" is famous for its eye treatments, minimal charges, and reliable doctors. It attracts patients from all around the state of Gujarat.

Shri Gangaba Sarvajanik Hospital, Chikhodra, Anand, Gujarat, India

"Shri Gangaba Sarvajanik Hospital" is the only hospital in Chikhodra. There are other private clinics which are run by the private doctors.
