= Tribhuvandas Kishibhai Patel =

Indian independence activist, lawyer and politician

- Born: 22 October 1903; Anand, Bombay Presidency, British India (now in Gujarat, India)
- Died: 3 June 1994 (aged 90); Gujarat, India
- Political party: Indian National Congress
- Spouse: Shrimati Mani Laxmi
- Awards: Padma Bhushan (1964); Ramon Magsaysay Award (1963)

Tribhuvandas Kishibhai Patel (22 October 1903 - 3 June 1994) was an Indian independence activist, lawyer, and politician. A follower of Mahatma Gandhi, he is regarded as the father of the cooperative movement in India, most notably in the Kaira District Co-operative Milk Producers' Union in 1946, and the Anand Co-operative movement.

== Early life and activism ==
Shri Tribhuvandas Kishibhai Patel was born on 22 October 1903, in Anand, Gujarat.

He was born to a farmer Shri Kishibhai Patel and Smt. Lakhibha. Shri Kishibhai had two sons, Shri Chimmanbhai Patel and Shri Tribhuvandas Patel. He completed his initial schooling in Nanaadhni Dharmasala, Anand Primary School and the rest of the schooling was done in New English School - at present this school is known as DN High School of Charotar Education Society, Anand. He joined Gujarat Vidyapith, Ahmedabad for his degree. During this period, he entered the freedom movement of the country along with Mahatma Gandhi. In 1918, he married Smt. Maniben Mothibhai Patel of Thamana village in Anand. Shri Patel had six children.

Tribhuvandas became a follower of Mahatma Gandhi and Sardar Vallabhbhai Patel during the Indian independence movement, and especially the civil disobedience movements, which led to his repeated imprisonment in 1930, 1935 and 1942.

He was involved in various movements propagated by Mahatma Gandhi, like civil disobedience, rural development and drive against untouchability, alcoholism, etc. He was the President of Harijan Sevak Samiti from 1948 to 1983. In Nasik in 1930 he was jailed for the first time for the salt satyagraha. He was further imprisoned in Visapur in 1930 where he took the oath to dedicate his life for the benefit of the masses at large.

== Cooperative movement ==
By the late 1940s, he started working with farmers in Kheda district, under the guidance of Sardar Vallabhbhai Patel, and after setting up the Kaira District Co-operative Milk Producer's Union in 1946 under his chairmanship, he hired Verghese Kurien in 1950, who was instrumental in developing the technical and marketing strategies of the Union which was eventually called Amul. Verghese Kurien remained the general manager of Amul till 2005. Under Tribhuvandas Patel's leadership and guidance and together with Verghese Kurien, many organizations were started in Anand including the Gujarat Cooperative Milk Marketing Federation, National Dairy Development Board and Institute of Rural Management Anand.

Tribhuvandas Patel was awarded the 1963 Ramon Magsaysay Award for 'Community Leadership', together with Dara Nusserwanji Khurody, and Verghese Kurien., and the Padma Bhushan from the Govt. of India in 1964.

He remained Secretary/President of the Pradesh Congress Committee (PCC), Indian National Congress (Congress I), and also a member of Rajya Sabha twice, 1967–1968 and 1968 -1974 from the party.

Under the leadership of Tribhuvandas Patel, in August 1973, Amul celebrated its 25th anniversary with Morarji Desai, Maniben Patel and Verghese Kurien. When he voluntarily retired from the Chairmanship of AMUL, in the early 1970s, he was presented with a purse of six hundred thousand rupees, by the grateful members of the village cooperatives — one rupee per member being the contribution. He used this fund to start a charitable trust and NGO, named the Tribhuvandas Foundation, to work on women and child health in the Kheda district of Gujarat. He was the first Chairman of Tribhuvandas Foundation. He handed over the chairmanship to Verghese Kurien, when the organization started to grow quickly, after receiving funds from foreign grant s.

The former chairperson of the National Dairy Development Board, Amrita Patel remarked in her opening address at an event at the Institute of Rural Management Anand about the Tribhuvandas Foundation saying "[Tribhuvandas Foundation] works in over 600 villages in the state of Gujarat in the field of maternal and infant care. What is unique about the programme of the Foundation is that it rides on the back of milk. It is the village milk co-operative that appoints a village health worker and pays an honorarium to the village health worker to undertake the work. So it is milk paying for health."

Patel was active until his death, working to set up cooperative organizations for farming commodities such as oil. In the days before his death on June 3, 1994, thousands of farmers from all over Kaira visited him, assuring him that the movement started in 1946 would be continued. In these last days, he frequently asked about Kurien who, despite the urgency conveyed to him, never visited him before his death. More incidents and details about Patel's life have not been reported in English, partly due to the lack of translation from the native Gujarati language.

== Awards and honours ==
- 1963: Ramon Magsaysay Award for 'Community Leadership'
- 1964: Padma Bhushan

== Personal life ==
He was married to Shrimati Mani Laxmi, and had one daughter and six sons. He had several grandchildren, great-grandchildren, and great-great-grandchildren.
