= Sardar Patel Renewable Energy Research Institute =

Private research institution and NGO

- Motto: Striving For Excellence
- Type: Research Institute
- Established: 1979
- Affiliations: Autonomous
- Chairman: Amrita Patel
- Director: Dr. Gaurav Mishra
- Location: Anand, Gujarat, India
- Campus: Urban
- Website: http://www.spreri.org

The Sardar Patel Renewable Energy Research Institute (SPRERI) is a non-government (NGO) private Research Institution located in Anand, Gujarat, India. It primarily focuses on renewable energy production from solar energy, microorganism, biomass and various types of wastes.

== History ==
It was established at Anand, Gujarat in January 1979 by a group of philanthropists and visionary led by late Dr. H.M. Patel and Late Shri Nanubhai Amin. It is a non-profit autonomous organization registered as a Society under the Societies Registration Act 21 of 1860. It is a Public Trust under the Bombay Public Trust Act 1950. It has been approved as a Research Association for the purpose of clause (ii) of subsection (1) of Section 35 of the Income Tax Act 1961 and is recognized as a Scientific and Industrial Research Organization (SIRO) by the Department of Science and Technology, Govt. of India. In addition, it is recognized by Sardar Patel University, Vallabh Vidyanagar, Junagadh Agricultural University, Junagadh, Nirma University, Ahmadabad as a center for education, training, and research.

== Research Divisions ==
- Solar Energy Division
- Bio-Conversion Technology Division
- Thermo-chemical Conversion Division
- Extensions Division

== Research and development ==
Consultancy : Design, development, commissioning and monitoring the performance of renewable devices and systems, organizing seminars, workshops, business meets, etc. A scientist from the institute appeared in a list of top global scientists in their field released by Stanford University.

Testing : Performance testing of renewable devices and systems for the purpose of certification and product improvement.

Training : For users, technicians, students, teachers and researchers, fabricators, financiers and policy makers.

The institute developed Biomass Cookstove and solar fridges.

== See also ==
- Education in India
- Education in Gujarat
