= Haryana Dairy Development Cooperative Federation Ltd =

- Type: State Government Cooperative
- Industry: Dairy
- Founded: 1970
- Headquarters: Panchkula, Haryana.
- Products: Milk and its Products
- Owner: Ministry of Cooperation, Government of Haryana
- Website: https://www.vitaindia.org.in/

Haryana Dairy Development Cooperative Federation Ltd has been formed in 1970 as a state government cooperative for facilitating procurement, processing, and marketing of milk and dairy products under brand name Vita in state of Haryana. Assisted by the Ministry of Cooperation of the Government of Haryana, it is owned by the members of cooperative societies. It procures milk from its producers particularly belonging to economically weaker sections in the state of Haryana and subsequently processes into milk and various milk products for marketing through affiliated milk unions. It provides education to the unions on dairy processing efficiency, and helps them with guidance on animal care including artificial insemination, vaccination, and feeding.

== History ==
The Haryana Dairy Development Cooperative Federation Ltd was started in 1970 as the cooperative societies movement to facilitate milk procurement from various producers in the state to promote the socio-economic development by facilitating its processing into various products before marketing through different unions across Haryana under the brand name "Vita".

== Co-operative societies model ==
Dairy Cooperatives in state work in three tier system wherein

1. Village-level Milk Producers Cooperative Societies: Haryana has 3300 village-level milk cooperative societies (including 1870 women-only societies) across 3000 with more than 250,000 members of which 75,000 members regularly supply milk which on average supply 850,000 liter/day in winter and 400,000 liter/day in summers.
2. District-level Milk Unions operate:
3. State-level Dairy Federation:

== Milk production ==
Haryana Dairy Development Cooperative Federation Ltd procures milk from one of the highest yielding buffalo breed called "Murrah buffaloes".

=== Milk processing plants ===
In 2025, Haryana had the following 7 milk processing plants (with year of foundation and daily processing capacity) with over 1 million liter/day combined processing capacity, supported by bigger number of milk chilling plants which supply milk to the processing plants.

1. Sirsa Milk Processing Plant, 1996-1997, 110,000 liter/day,
2. Jind Milk Processing Plant, 1970-1971, 150,000 liter/day,
3. Ambala Milk Processing Plant, 1973-1974, 140,000 liter/day,
4. Kurukshetra Milk Processing Plant, 2014-15, 20,000 liter/day,
5. Rohtak Milk Processing Plant, 1976-1977, 400,000 liter/day,
6. Bawal Milk Processing Plant in Rewari, 2025-26.
7. Ballabgarh Milk Processing Plant, 1979-1980, 125,000 liter/day,

=== Chilling plants ===
In 2025, Haryana had over 46 district and/or subdistrict level milk chilling plants which act as milk-aggregator for the village-level co-operative societies, chill the milk for preservation and then send it to the milk processing plants. Please help expand this partial list:

- Dabwali Milk Chilling Plant in Sirsa district,
- Hisar Milk Chilling Plant, between HAU and Mahabir Stadium,
- Salempur Milk Chilling Plant in Bhiwani district on SH19 southwest of Isharwal,
- Nuh Milk Chilling Plant,

== Sales ==
=== Vita brand ===
Vita is the brand name for various milk products marketed by the Haryana Dairy Development Cooperative Federation. Haryana Dairy Development Cooperative Federation Ltd is supported by Haryana Government in promoting branding, sales and consumption of cow milk. Haryana Government periodically reviews and enhances the purchase rate of the milk based on the fat content in the milk in addition to subsidy per litre of milk given to the producers.

=== Products ===
Under the Vita brand the plain and flavoured milk, ghee, butter, dahi (traditional yogurt), lassi, paneer (cheese), ice cream, and milk-based traditional sweets are produced and sold. From October 2020, Haryana Dairy Development Cooperative Federation Ltd had introduced turmeric milk and from January 2021, Cow Ghee.

=== Distribution ===
Some of the milk is also provided free to the school students as part of the Midday Meal Scheme.

Haryana Dairy Development Cooperative Federation Ltd, had started VITA milk booths at Indian Oil Corporation Ltd (IOCL) operated petrol pumps in several places of the state since 2016.

Haryana Dairy Development Cooperative Federation had started online delivery of its products in select areas of the state from year 2020, and for this had tied up with Swiggy, food ordering and delivery platform.

== Issues ==
As of 2025, all 7 milk processing plants of Haryana are located in east (along Grand Trunk Road) and north Haryana, none in western Haryana. Hence, there is regional disparity in dairy development across regions of Haryana, successive governments of various parties are responsible for this regional discrimination in the dairy development.

== See also ==
- Cooperative movement in India
- Amul, largest milk-cooperative society in India
- Bihar State Milk Co-operative Federation
- Karnataka Milk Federation
- Odisha State Cooperative Milk Producers' Federation
