= Polson (brand) =

Indian dairy products brand

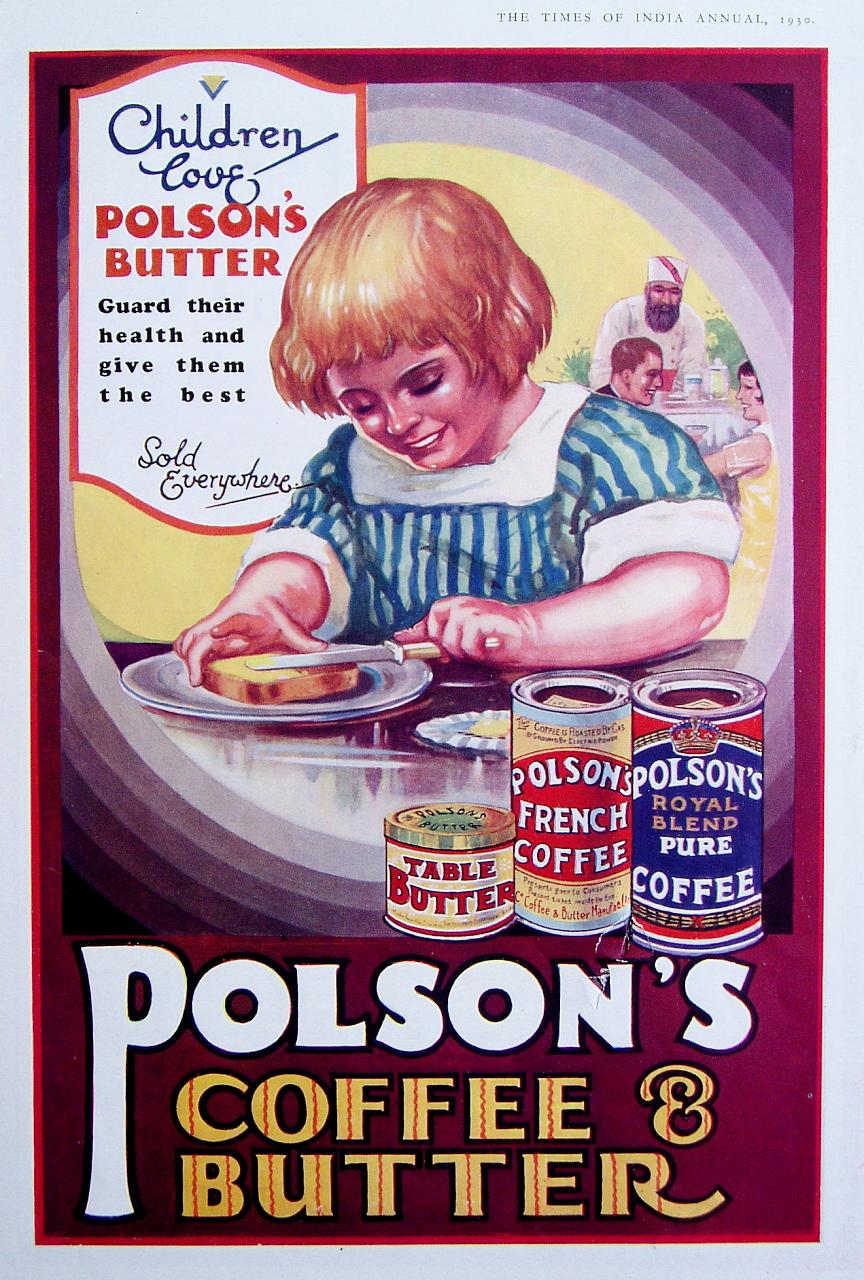
- Company type: Private
- Industry: Dairy
- Founded: 1900
- Headquarters: Mumbai, India
- Key people: Pestonjee Eduljee
- Products: Milk, Butter, Coffee, other dairy products

Polson is the name of a dairy products brand that was started in India by Pestonjee Eduljee in 1915 in Mumbai. Polson's first dairy was set up in Anand, Gujarat at the cost of ₹7 lakh (US$7,300) in 1930.

== History ==
Before Polson dairy was started, housewives in India used to buy butter and milk from the milkmen directly. First, when Polson dairy started out, it had to employ non-Indian staff initially. During World War I it supplied Polson Butter and Polson's Pure coffee to British Indian and American forces. At its peak, it was producing up to 5 tons of butter every day and to meet the demands of the forces as a result of which a new factory office was started in Bombay. Polson was known to let its cream sour for a few days and that stale cream was then heavily salted and processed to make butter. This is the reason why a rival brand Amul's butter made of fresh cream flopped in the market because consumers were too used to Polson's taste.

== Monopoly and downfall ==
As an incentive to big consumers, the brand used to hand out gift coupons as rewards. By 1945, Polson as a brand was flourishing and had touched a record production of 3 million pounds of butter every year. Despite this success rate, it did not do much to help improve the condition of Indian farmers. Due to the monopoly it had established with government support, farmers were unable to sell their milk to any other vendor in the market. This was brought to the attention of Sardar Vallabhbhai Patel, an Indian nationalist leader in the freedom struggle. Sardar Vallabhbhai Patel, who had been toying with the idea of opening a cooperative society since 1942, finally initiated a co-operative movement with the farmers in 1946. This led to the formation of Amul, a rival and a milk cooperative, on 14 December 1946. With this decline in dairy operations, Polson was bought out by its main promoters, Shushila and Jagdish Amol Kapadia who then diverted the business towards vegetable tanning extracts, dyes and pigments for leather production from the 1970s.
