= National Dairy Development Board =

Indian statutory body

- Founded: 16 July 1965 (61 years ago)
- Founder: Dr Verghese Kurien
- Type: Statutory body
- Purpose: Dairy industry regulation; Dairy industry development
- Location: Anand, Gujarat, India
- Chairman: Dr. Meenesh Shah
- Parent organization: Ministry of Fisheries, Animal Husbandry and Dairying, Government of India.
- Subsidiaries: Mother Dairy; IDMC Ltd; Indian Immunologicals Limited; NDDB CALF Ltd.; NDDB Dairy Services; NDDB Mrida Ltd.
- Website: www.nddb.coop

The National Dairy Development Board (NDDB) is a statutory body set up by an Act of the Parliament of India and an Institution of National Importance. It is under administrative control of the Ministry of Fisheries, Animal Husbandry and Dairying of the Government of India. The main office is in Anand, Gujarat with regional offices throughout the country. NDDB's subsidiaries include Indian Dairy Machinery Company Ltd (IDMC), Mother Dairy and Indian Immunologicals Limited, Hyderabad, NDDB Dairy Services, NDDB Mrida Ltd., NDDB CALF Ltd. The Board was created to finance and support producer-owned and controlled organisations. Its programmes and activities seek to strengthen farmer cooperatives and support national policies that are favourable to the growth of such institutions. Cooperative principles and cooperative strategies are fundamental to the board's efforts.

Meenesh Shah was appointed the Chairman of NDDB in 2021.

== Establishment ==
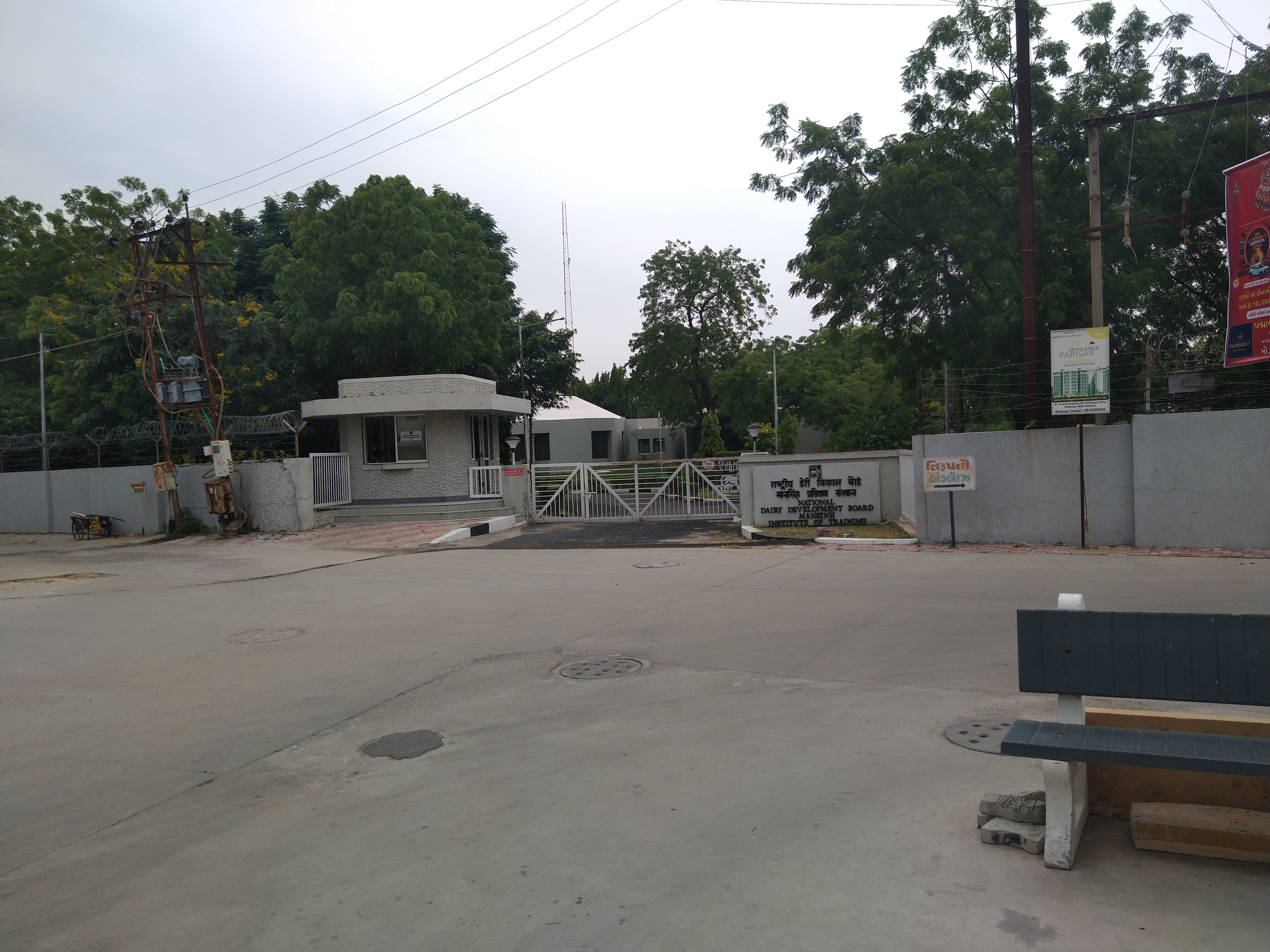
Mansinh Institute of Training of National Dairy Development Board at Mehsana, Gujarat

The NDDB was founded by Dr. Verghese Kurien in 1965. The prime minister of India at that time, Lal Bahadur Shastri, wished to replicate the success of the Kaira Cooperative Milk Producers' Union (Amul) across India. Kurien had been instrumental in Amul's success, where he had instituted a producer-run, democratic farmers' cooperative model. Until this time, India's own dairy industry was limited in its capacity and dominated by traders who set pricing. Marginal milk producers reaped little reward in this system, and the country's foreign exchange was expended in European and New Zealand dairy industries, purchasing dairy imports to fill the shortfall.

Between the start of the NDDB's landmark project in 1970, Operation Flood and its founder's retirement in 1998, India quadrupled its milk production, with the board's technical and organisational support. By then India had 81,000 dairy cooperatives, formed with the assistance of NDDB on their "Amul" pattern. In 1998, India became the largest milk producer in the world, when its output surpassed that of the United States. The country remains a major dairy-producing nation.

== Agencies ==
1. NDDB Dairy Services, a wholly owned subsidiary
2. Mother Dairy Fruit and Vegetable Private Limited, a wholly owned subsidiary

== Initiatives ==
In 2012, under the national dairy plan (NDP) programme, NDDB had initiated plans to boost dairy farming by targeting 40,000 villages in fourteen major milk producing states including Punjab. The project was aimed at covering about 2.7 million milch animals in these states.

In October 2020, the NDDB launched a "manure management initiative" at the Mujkuva Dairy Cooperative Society (DCS) in Anand district, wherein biogas plants are installed by dairy farmers outside their residences for producing gas to be used as cooking fuel. In addition to biogas, bio-slurry produced from these biogas plants will also be used by the farmers in their own fields for soil conditioning. Surplus bio-slurry can be sold to other farmers or converted into organic fertilisers.

In 2000, in accordance with the plans of NDDB to reach out to more states, it signed a Memorandum of Understanding with the administration of Ladakh to promote dairying and rural livelihoods in the newly formed union territory.

In one innovative approach, NDDB, in collaboration with All India Radio (AIR), launched Radio Samvad—an awareness series on radio for dairy farmers of the Vidarbha and Marathwada regions. As of 2020, a twice weekly, 30-minute episode was broadcast from Nagpur, Jalgaon, Aurangabad, Osmanabad and Nanded radio stations on subjects related to scientific dairy animal management. Subject experts from NDDB conduct the sessions.

== See also ==
- Amrita Patel – Indian businessperson, head of NDDB 1998–2014
- Agriculture in India
- Cooperative movement in India

=== Dairy cooperatives ===
- Aavin, the Tamil Nadu Cooperative Milk Producers Federation
- Amul, the Gujarat Cooperative Milk Marketing Federation Ltd
- Bihar State Milk Co-operative Federation, producers of the Sudha dairy brand
- Karnataka Milk Federation, producers of the Nandini brand
- Kerala Co-operative Milk Marketing Federation, trade name: Milma
- Haryana Dairy Development Cooperative Federation Ltd, brand name: Vita
- Odisha State Cooperative Milk Producers' Federation (OMFED)
