= Cooperative movement in India =

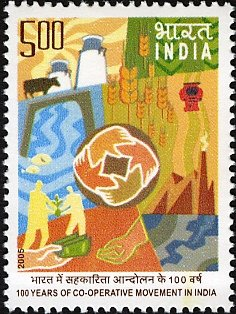
Stamp of India 2005, 100 Years of Cooperative Movement in India

The cooperative movement in India plays a crucial role in the dairy, agricultural, banking, and housing sectors. The history of cooperatives in India is more than a hundred years old, developing rapidly after Indian independence. As of 1 January 2026, over 848,000 cooperatives are active, according to the information available on the National Cooperative Database. Many cooperative societies, particularly in rural areas, increase political participation and are used as a stepping stone by aspiring politicians.

== History ==
Organised cooperative activity in India began with the enactment of Co-operative Credit Societies Act, 1904. The law was enacted on the recommendation of the Edward Law Committee and modelled partly on the Friendly Societies Act 1896. In the initial stage cooperative movement in India grew slowly. Following the enactment, British govt formed a cooperative rule on the basis of report given by Fredric Nicholson, a British officer of Madras region. The first cooperative society formed in TIRUR of Tiruvallur district of present day state of TamilNadu becoming the first cooperative of Asia. It was started by Adhinarayana Ayya on 30 August 1904.

== Government initiatives ==
Recent Govt initiatives include digitalization of PACS,introduction of model by-laws for formation of new primary cooperatives,preference of cooperatives for common service center and jan aushadhi stores.Ministry of Cooperation has launched white revolution 2.0 for resilent milk production and procurement by cooperatives.

=== Legal framework ===
Co-operative Societies Act (1912) provides the legal framework.

=== Policy and strategic intervention ===
National Policy on Cooperatives was formulated in 2002 to develop the cooperative societies sector.

The Ministry of Cooperation revised the old policy and launched National Cooperation Policy 2025. The new policy promotes the vision of 'Sahkar Se Samriddhi' (Prosperity through Cooperation) while contributing the India's long-term development agenda including its goal of becoming Vikshit Bharat by 2047.

=== Union Government Ministry of Cooperation ===
The Union Ministry of Cooperation is a ministry under the Government of India which was formed in July 2021. The ministry provides a separate administrative, legal and policy framework for strengthening the cooperative movement in the country. The ministry's creation was announced on 6 July 2021 along with its vision statement of "Sahkar se samriddhi" (transl. Prosperity through cooperation). Before the creation of this ministry, the objectives of this ministry were looked after by the Ministry of Agriculture.

The ministry works in strengthening cooperatives at the grassroot level, working to streamline processes for 'Ease of doing business' for cooperatives and enabling the development of Multi-State Co-operatives (MSCS). The same was initially announced by Finance Minister Nirmala Sitharaman while presenting the 2021 Union budget. The ministry was created with objectives of:

- To realise the vision of "Sahkar se Samriddhi" (prosperity through cooperation).
- To streamline processes for ‘'Ease of doing business’' for cooperatives and enable development of Multi-State Co-operatives (MSCS)
- To provide a separate administrative, legal and policy framework for strengthening the cooperative movements in the country.
- To deepen the cooperative as a true people-based movement reaching up to the grassroot level.

Many experts have raised concerns about the new ministry because cooperative societies are subject of State List under the Seventh schedule of the Constitution, and therefore creating such a ministry at the central level would increase the power in the hands of the union government. Kerala's Minister of Co-operation and Registration V. N. Vasavan stated that, "Creation of a new Cooperation ministry is an infringement upon the rights of the state governments.

== Agriculture ==
The country has networks of cooperatives at the local, regional, state and national levels that assist in agricultural marketing. The commodities that are mostly handled are food grains, jute, cotton, sugar, milk, fruit and nuts. Support by the state government led to more than 25,000 cooperatives being set up by 1990s in Maharashtra.

=== Agri product marketing cooperatives ===
As with sugar, cooperatives play a significant part in the overall marketing of fruit and vegetables in India. Since the 1980s, the amount of produce handled by Cooperative societies has increased exponentially. Common fruit and vegetables marketed by the societies include bananas, mangoes, grapes, onions and many others. ChangthangiPashmina which remained as the monopoly of few traders is also moving towards fairness in production and supply chains with source region Ladakh's cooperative Looms of Ladakh.

=== Dairy ===
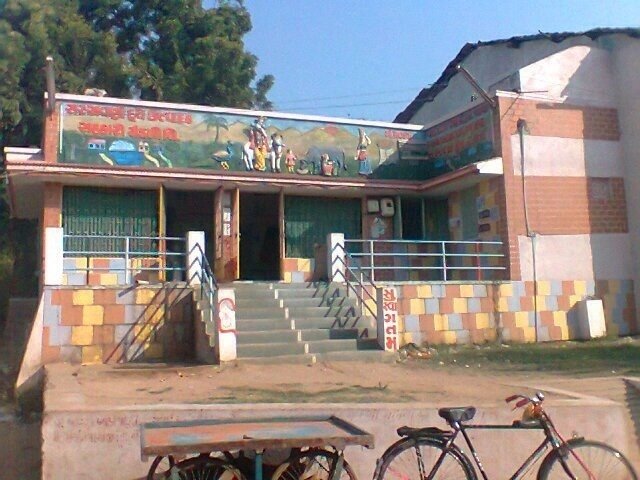
Saraswani milk producing cooperative society milk collection center in Gujarat. Collected milk is sent to Amul for further processing and distribution.

Dairy farming based on the Amul Pattern, with a single marketing cooperative, is India's largest self-sustaining industry and its largest rural employment provider. Implementation of the Amul model has made India the world's largest milk producer. Here small, marginal farmers with a couple or so heads of milch cattle queue up twice daily to pour milk from their small containers into the village union collection points. The milk after processing at the district unions is then marketed by the state cooperative federation nationally under the Amul brand name, India's largest food brand. With the Anand pattern three-fourths of the price paid by the mainly urban consumers goes into the hands of millions of small dairy farmers, who are the owners of the brand and the cooperative. The cooperative hires professionals for their expertise and skills and uses hi-tech research labs and modern processing plants and transport cold-chains, to ensure quality of their produce and value-add to the milk.

=== Sugar ===
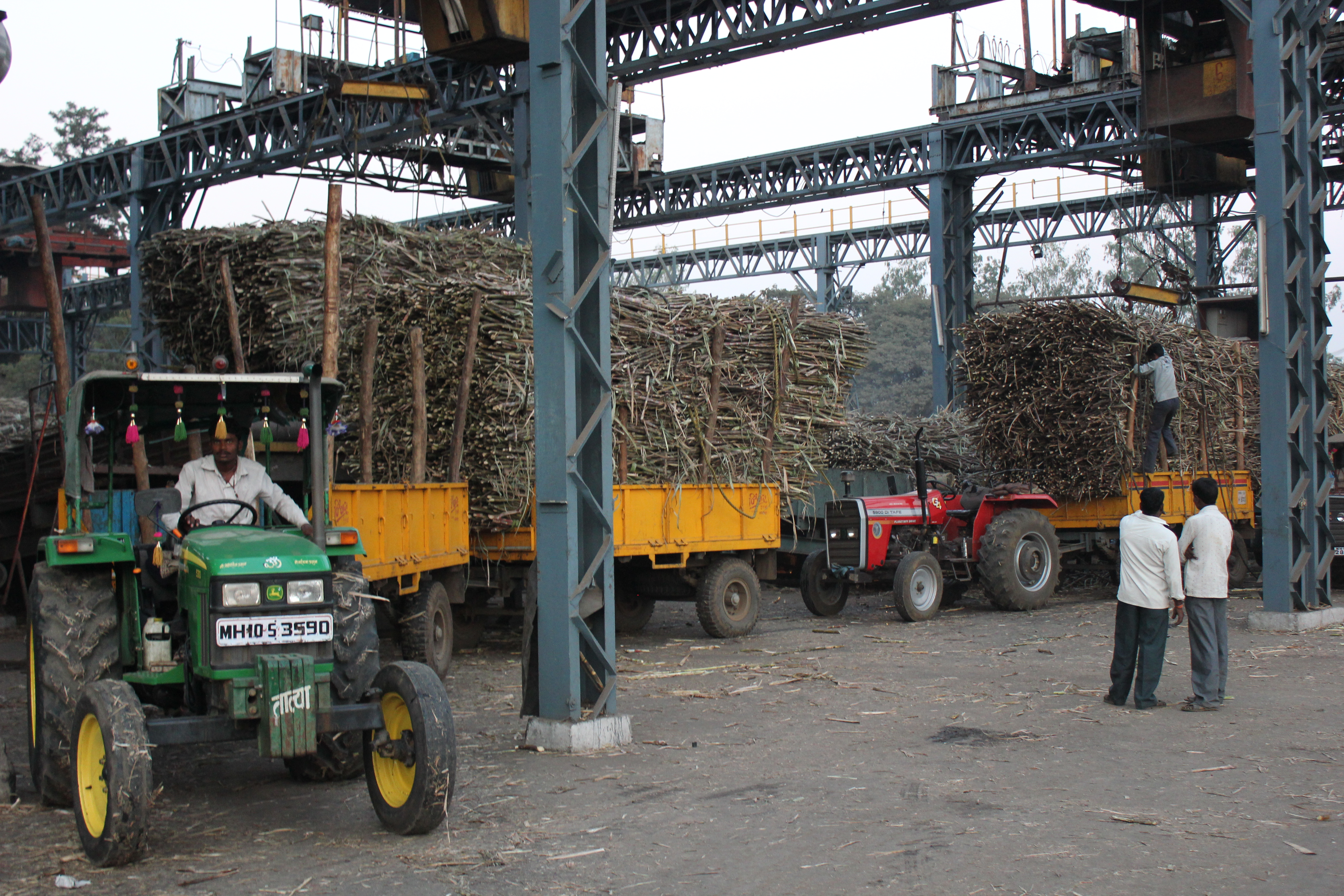
Sugarcane weighing at a cooperative sugar mill in Maharashtra, India

Most of the sugar production in India takes place at mills owned by local cooperative societies. The members of the society include all farmers, small and large, supplying sugarcane to the mill. Over the last fifty years, the local sugar mills have played a crucial part in encouraging political participation and as a stepping stone for aspiring politicians. This is particularly true in the state of Maharashtra where a large number of politicians belonging to the Congress party or NCP had ties to sugar cooperatives from their local area and has created a symbiotic relationship between the sugar factories and local politics. However, the policy of "profits for the company but losses to be borne by the government", has made a number of these operations inefficient.

== Banking and rural credit ==
Cooperatives also play a great part in banking. Cooperative banks in India serve both the rural and urban societies. Just like the sugar companies, these institutions serve as the power base for local politicians.

== Housing societies ==
Widely known as Cooperative Housing Societies, these housing alternatives are established to help people with limited income to construct houses at reasonable costs.

The function of housing cooperatives varies based on geographical and cultural context. Compared to Western and European understandings of housing cooperatives, that primarily views cooperatives as equating to collective ownership, India differs from these conceptions about how cooperative housing societies operate.

Mumbai and Chennai are two areas that set the present for cooperative movements in India, influencing development in other major cities such as New Delhi, Thiruvananthapuram, and Kolkata. Despite the cooperative success and influence of these cities' in other regions, Mumbai and Chennai differ from the cities of Maharashtra and Tamil Nadu, known as areas in India that demonstrate a long history of cooperative efforts.

=== Types of housing cooperatives ===
There are three distinct types of housing cooperatives in India approved by each state, through the Cooperative Societies Act, based on the co-op housing objectives and functionality. The categories of cooperative housing are tenure, finance, and building cooperatives. The classifications of these cooperatives vary across states, and its approval is not exclusive to each state.

Ganapati (2008) defines these categories as the following:

In Tenure co-operatives, members collectively own and manage housing, similar to co-operative housing in the Western countries. Finance co-operatives provide loans for new construction or housing repairs to members. Building co-operatives construct housing for their members, but they may also be involved in land development.

=== Multi State cooperative Society ===
Any society that is formed with the object of the economic and social improvement of its members by way of self-help groups with mutual aid, but is registered in more than one state is known as Multi State Cooperative Society.

== Khadi cooperatives ==
As of 2009, there were 5,600 registered institutions and 30,138 Cooperative societies for Khadi which employs nearly 95 lakh (9.5 million) people. Khadi and Village Industries Commission uses government provided funds to implement its programs either directly - through its 29 state offices, by directly funding Khadi and Village institutions and cooperatives, or indirectly through 33 Khadi and Village Industries Boards, which are statutory bodies formed by the state governments within India, set up for the purpose of promoting Khadi and Village Industries in their respective states. The Khadi and Village Industries Boards, in turn, fund Khadi and Village Institutions/Co-operatives/Entrepreneurs.

== List of major cooperative societies in India ==
=== Aavin ===
Aavin is a statutory corporation and the trademark of Tamil Nadu Co-operative Milk Producers' Federation Limited. Aavin procures milk, processes it and sells milk and milk products to consumers.

=== Amul ===
Amul cooperative from India is the world's largest producer of milk, an achievement of the White Revolution in India, which was spurred by Amul. An Indian dairy cooperative society established in 1946, Amul is located in Anand, Gujarat. Dr Verghese Kurien, known as the father of the White Revolution, was the chairman of GCMMF for more than 30 years. Gujarat Cooperative Milk Marketing Federation Ltd. (GCMMF) is the cooperative body which manages the brand of Amul. GCMMF is currently owned by an apex body of 13 District Milk Unions, representing 3.6 million milk producers, spread across 13,000 villages of Gujarat.

=== Karnataka Milk Federation ===
After Amul, Karnataka Milk Federation is the second largest milk cooperative in India. It is a federation of milk producers association working on cooperative principles. In 1974, KMF was founded as Karnataka Dairy Development Corporation (KDDC) to implement a dairy development project. This project was run by the World Bank. Procurement of milk is done from Primary Dairy Cooperative Societies (DCS) by Karnataka Milk Federation (KMF), which has 14 milk unions throughout the Karnataka State which procure and distribute milk to the consumers. The milk is marketed under the brand name Nandini.

=== Horticultural Producers’ Cooperative Marketing and Processing Society (HOPCOMS) ===
It is a farmers’ society founded in 1965. HOPCOMS comes under the jurisdiction of the Department of horticulture, Government of Karnataka. It was founded with the objective of direct marketing of farm products. HOPCOMS is headquartered in Bengaluru. HOPCOMS is spread across districts of Bangalore Rural, Bangalore Urban, Mysuru, Mandya, Chikkaballapura, Ramanagar of Karnataka. The operations of HOPCOMS are three-fold: distribution, storage and procurement.

=== Indian Coffee House ===
Indian Coffee House is a chain of restaurants run by a series of worker cooperative societies. The India Coffee House chain was started by the Coffee Cess Committee in 1936, The idea of Coffee House was formed since native Indians were not allowed into Coffee Houses which were mainly allowed only for Europeans. The first outlet of Indian Coffee House was opened in Bombay. By the 1940's there were 50 coffee houses across the country. To run the coffee houses in India, there are 13 cooperative societies.

=== Southern Green Farming And Marketing Multi State Cooperative Society Limited (Farmfed) ===
It is an Agriculture society founded in 2008. Operational area of these society is Kerala and Tamil Nadu. Society's mission is socially, economically, and ecologically sustainable community development. Society help the farmers to get a reasonable return for their efforts in the soil by making them aware of various advanced techniques and methods of cultivation without harming the fundamental being of nature.

=== Indian Farmers Fertiliser Cooperative (IFFCO) ===
Indian Farmers Fertiliser Cooperative Limited (IFFCO) was registered on November 3, 1967, as a Multi-Unit Co-operative Society. On the enactment of the Multistate Co-operative Societies Act 2002, the Society is deemed to be registered as a Multistate Co-operative Society. The Society is primarily engaged in production and distribution of fertilisers. The byelaws of the Society provide a board frame work for the activities of IFFCO as a Co-operative Society. At IFFCO, the thirst for ever improving the services to farmers and member cooperatives is insatiable, commitment to quality is isurmountable and harnessing of mother earths' bounty to drive hunger away from India in an ecologically sustainable manner is the prime mission. See also:

- Ministry of Co-operation
- List of cooperatives in India
- List of co-operative federations
- Institute of Rural Management Anand
