= Indian Immunologicals Limited =

Subsidiary of National Dairy Development Board

- Type: Subsidiary of National Dairy Development Board
- Industry: Biotechnology
- Headquarters: Hyderabad, India
- Key people: Dr. K. Anand Kumar (Managing Director)
- Website: www.indimmune.com

Indian Immunologicals Limited (IIL) is a subsidiary of the National Dairy Development Board. It is based in Hyderabad, Telangana, India. IIL is registered in India as a Public Limited Company under the Companies Act, 1956 (Ministry of Corporate Affairs – MCA Services), It was established in 1982 by the National Dairy Development Board.

It is noted for developing veterinary and human vaccines for foot-and-mouth disease, rabies, bacterial vaccines, canine vaccines, hepatitis, measles, MMR and DPT.

IIL is a major supplier of DPT, TT and hepatitis B vaccines to India's large Universal Immunization Programme. IIL has three vaccine manufacturing facilities in India. The Gachibowli-Hyderabad facility is engaged in the production of vaccines, while the Karakapatla-Hyderabad facility produces animal health formulations and human vaccines. IIL's facility in Ooty exclusively produces the human anti-rabies vaccine, "Abhayrab". Pristine Biologicals Ltd is IIL's subsidiary in New Zealand and is involved in the production of serum used in the manufacture of vaccines. Indian Immunologicals, IIL, on 25 November 2023, launched the measles and rubella vaccine 'Mabella' for children. A live-attenuated MR vaccine developed in partnership with Polyvac Institute of Vietnam was launched as part of the 25th celebrations of the IIL division Human Biologicals Institute (HBI) in Udhagamandalam (Ooty), Tamil Nadu. Indian Immunologicals has introduced the first indigenously developed Hepatitis A vaccine, Havisure. The vaccine is available in two formulations: a 1ml dose for adults and a 0.5ml dose for pediatric use.

== Animal Health ==
IIL manufactures animal health vaccines and formulations. IIL is the third largest animal health player in the Indian market and the market leader in veterinary biologicals in India. IIL operates one plant that is WHO-GMP and ISO-9001, 14001, 18001, and 27001 certified. IIL also introduced the world's first vaccine against Porcine Cysticercosis –Cysvax. IIL is the only producer of companion animal vaccines in India. Indian Immunologicals Limited advances its fish vaccine development efforts through a collaboration agreement with ICAR-CIBA.

== Human Health ==
IIL operates a manufacturing facility in Ooty to manufacture the Vero cell culture rabies vaccine for use in human beings. This plant was set up in 1998 at the specific request of the Government of India in order to phase out use of the older and unsafe sheep brain vaccine (also termed nerve tissue vaccine – NTV) with the modern tissue culture vaccine.

The plant, which commenced commercial production in phases from September 2006, meets a large part of the requirements of the Universal Immunization Programme of the Ministry of Health, Govt of India.

Indian Immunologicals and the Indian Council of Medical Research have signed an agreement for the development of a Zika vaccine. Indian Immunologicals' Dengue Vaccine for Dengue Fever: Prospects for Approval Indian Immunologicals Ltd is developing a bi-valent human monoclonal antibody for the treatment of rabies.

== Human Biologicals Institute ==
IIL established Human Biologicals Institute (HBI) in 1999 to manufacture the modern Tissue Culture Anti Rabies Vaccine (TCARV) for human use at Ooty, Tamil Nadu.

== International Business ==
IIL exports its products to more than 50 countries across the world with a customer focus in the Middle East, Asia, Africa, CISR countries, and expanding in Central and Latin America.

== Coronavirus Vaccine Development ==
Immunologicals Limited (IIL) is developing a vaccine for coronavirus in a cross-continental collaboration. It is leading the cross-continental research collaboration in association with Griffith University of Australia to develop 'live attenuated SARS-CoV-2 Vaccine or COVID-19 vaccine' using the latest codon de-optimization technology. Indian Immunologicals Limited Collaborates on Development of Innovative Needle-free Intranasal COVID-19 Vaccine.

== See also ==
- Genome Valley
