= Isharwal =

- Village
- Location in Punjab, India Isharwal (India)
- Coordinates: 31.265978°N 75.279988°E
- Country: India
- State: Punjab
- District: Kapurthala

Government
  - Type: Panchayati raj (India)
  - Body: Gram panchayat

Population (2011)
  - Total: 1,537
- Sex ratio 797/740♂/♀

Languages
  - Official: Punjabi
  - Other spoken: Hindi
- Time zone: UTC+5:30 (IST)
- PIN: 144620
- Telephone code: 01822
- ISO 3166 code: IN-PB
- Vehicle registration: PB-09
- Website: kapurthala.gov.in

Isharwal is a village in Kapurthala district of Punjab State, India. It is located 15 kilometres (9.3 mi) from Kapurthala, which is both district and sub-district headquarters of Isharwal. The village is administrated by a Sarpanch, who is an elected representative.

== Demography ==
According to the report published by Census India in 2011, Isharwal has total number of 284 houses and population of 1,537 of which include 797 males and 740 females. Literacy rate of Isharwal is 74.14%, lower than state average of 75.84%. The population of children under the age of 6 years is 137 which is 8.91% of total population of Isharwal, and child sex ratio is approximately 1076, higher than state average of 846.

== Population data ==
| Particulars | Total | Male | Female |
|---|---|---|---|
| Total No. of Houses | 284 | - | - |
| Population | 1,537 | 797 | 740 |
| Child (0-6) | 137 | 66 | 71 |
| Schedule Caste | 574 | 307 | 267 |
| Schedule Tribe | 0 | 0 | 0 |
| Literacy | 74.14 % | 77.15 % | 70.85 % |
| Total Workers | 564 | 461 | 103 |
| Main Worker | 462 | 0 | 0 |
| Marginal Worker | 102 | 55 | 47 |

== Air travel connectivity ==
The closest airport to the village is Sri Guru Ram Dass Jee International Airport.
