= Verghese Kurien =

Indian entrepreneur (1921–2012)

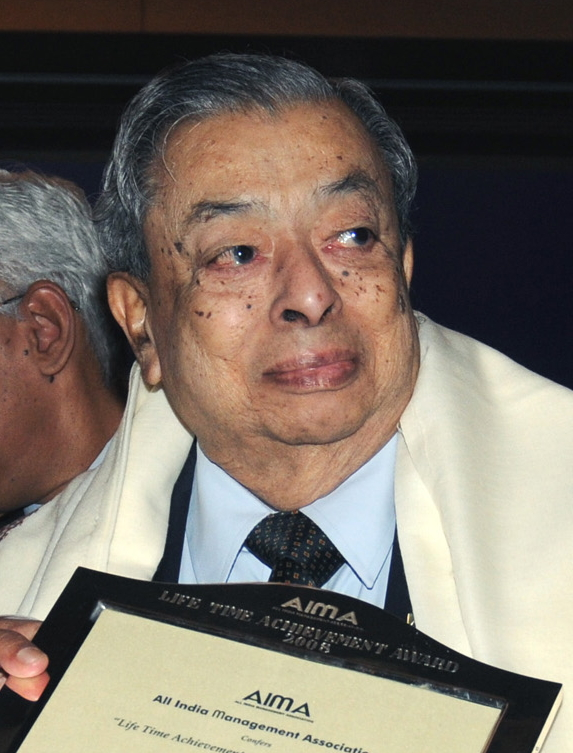
- Kurien in 2009
- Born: 26 November 1921; Calicut (now Kozhikode, Kerala, India)
- Died: 9 September 2012 (aged 90); Nadiad, Gujarat, India
- Education: University of Madras; Michigan State University
- Occupations: dairy engineer social entrepreneur
- Employer: Amul
- Organisations: National Dairy Development Board; Institute of Rural Management Anand; National Cooperative Dairy Federation of India
- Known for: White Revolution in India
- Awards: Ramon Magsaysay Award (1964); Padma Shri (1965); Padma Bhushan (1966); World Food Prize (1989); Order of Agricultural Merit (1997); Padma Vibhushan (1999)
- Website: www.drkurien.com

Verghese Kurien (26 November 1921 – 9 September 2012) was an Indian dairy engineer and social entrepreneur. He led initiatives that contributed to the extensive increase in milk production in India termed as the White Revolution.

Kurien graduated in physics from the University of Madras in 1940 and received his masters in mechanical engineering from the Michigan State University in 1947. In 1949, Kurien was sent by the Government of India to run its experimental creamery at Anand, where he set up the Kaira District Cooperative Milk Producers' Union in 1950 which later became Amul. Amul organised the dairy farmers in the villages as a part of cooperatives and linked them to the milk consumers directly, eliminating the need for middlemen.

In 1965, Kurien was appointed as the head of the newly formed National Dairy Development Board (NDDB), which helped to set up similar cooperatives across India and made dairy farming one of the largest self-sustaining industries and employment generators in rural areas. The dairy cooperatives were successful in increasing the milk production as the dairy farmers controlled the procurement, processing, and marketing as the owners of the cooperative. This led to a multi-fold increase in milk output over the next few decades and helped India become the world's largest milk producer in 1998. The co-operative model was later applied to other agricultural industries in India such as the production of edible oils and replicated in other countries.

For his contributions in increasing the dairy output, Kurien is known as the "Father of the White Revolution" in India. He was awarded the Ramon Magsaysay Award in 1964 and the World Food Prize in 1989. In 1999, he received the Padma Vibhushan, India's second highest civilian honour. He was conferred the Order of Agricultural Merit by the French Government in 1997.

== Early life and education ==
Kurien was born on 26 November 1921 in Calicut, Madras Presidency, British India (now Kozhikode, Kerala, India) in a Malayali Syrian Christian family. His father was a government civil surgeon and Kurien did his schooling at Diamond Jubilee Higher Secondary School at Gobichettipalayam, where his father worked at the government hospital there. He graduated in physics from Loyola College in 1940 and received a bachelor's degree in mechanical engineering from the College of Engineering, Guindy, affiliated to the University of Madras, in 1943.

Kurien wanted to join the Indian army as an engineer but instead he worked with Tata Steel Technical Institute in Jamshedpur. Kurien applied for a scholarship provided by the Government of India to study metallurgical engineering but instead received a scholarship to study dairy engineering. He was sent to train at the Imperial Institute of Animal Husbandry in Bangalore before being sent to the United States on a government scholarship. He graduated with a master's degree in mechanical engineering from the Michigan State University in 1948. Kurien had stated that though he was sent on a government scholarship to study dairy engineering, he studied metallurgical and nuclear engineering, disciplines which were likely to be of far greater use to the soon-to-be independent India and to himself.

== Career ==
=== Early years ===
In 1949, Kurien was sent by the government of India to its experimental creamery at Anand in Bombay province (currently in Gujarat). He spent the evenings helping Tribhuvandas Patel with fixing the dairy equipment used for processing the milk procured from the local farmers. Earlier in 1946, Patel had set up a cooperative at Kaira. It was formed as a response to the exploitation of small dairy farmers by traders and agents, who set arbitrary milk prices on behalf of Polson, which had a near-total monopoly in milk collection from Kaira. Kurien wanted to quit the government job and leave Anand but was persuaded by Patel to stay with him to help with his dairy cooperative.

=== Developing Amul ===
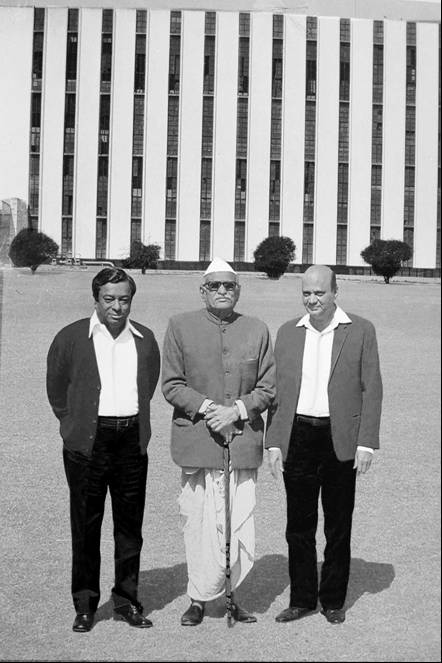
Kurien (left) with Tribhuvandas Patel (centre) and H. M. Dalaya at Anand

Kurien developed the Kaira District Cooperative Milk Producers' Union Limited (KDCMPUL) further which later became Amul. Milk collection was decentralised and was directly procured from the farmers at villages as a part of the cooperatives. Kurien and Tribhuvandas Patel were supported by Sardar Vallabhbhai Patel and Morarji Desai to help organise the dairy farmers. Kurien worked on the belief that economic self-interest of all sections of the village-society would make them align together to grow their cooperative and remove caste or class conflicts. The cooperative dairying venture was expanded to the nearby districts and was involved in the training of dairy students. By 1952, the daily milk procurement reached 20,000 litres from a mere 200 litres per day in 1948.

In 1956, Kurien visited Nestle in Switzerland at their invitation but with special instructions from the commerce and industries minister. Nestle was importing milk powder, sugar and other materials required to produce condensed milk in India. Kurien asked Nestle to reduce the imports to India, to try manufacturing condensed milk with buffalo milk procured locally and to engage more Indians in the production process. He was met with a refusal stating that the natives would not be able to handle the technology involved in the condensed milk production. On returning, he increased the production of condensed milk at Amul, the import of which was banned by Government of India two years later. H. M. Dalaya, who studied dairy engineering with Kurien at the US, was persuaded by Kurien to work with him at Anand. He helped develop an indigenous process of making skimmed milk powder and condensed milk from buffalo milk, which had a higher proportion of milk solids and increased its economic value. In India, buffalo milk was plentiful while cow milk was in short supply. With the production of condensed milk and baby food from Buffalo milk, Amul competed successfully against Nestle and Glaxo.

The then Commerce minister T T Krishnamachari also cut imports of butter in steps with Kurien promising and delivering an incremental increase of his production to substitute imported butter, especially from New Zealand. During the Sino-Indian War in 1962, production had to be diverted to the Indian armed forces which allowed Polson to gain market share. Kurien lobbied with the government to freeze Polson's production lines, as part of the war effort. Later research by G. H. Wilster led to cheese production from buffalo milk at Amul.

=== Nationwide expansion ===
Kurien with then Prime Minister Lal Bahadur Shastri in 1964

When then Prime Minister Lal Bahadur Shastri visited Anand to inaugurate Amul's cattle feed factory in October 1964, he interacted with the dairy farmers about their cooperative. In 1965, Shastri tasked Kurien to replicate the dairy's Anand scheme nationwide, for which the National Dairy Development Board (NDDB) was founded. It was established as a society based at Anand and was led by Kurien.

Kurien negotiated with FAO and UNICEF of the United Nations, and the World Bank for aid to develop the cooperatives as a part of "Operation Flood". In the first phase between 1970 and 1979, he focused on choosing the 18 best milk sheds across the country, setting up dairy cooperatives and linking them with nearby major cities, to capture the market there. The Anand model was replicated across Gujarat and Kurien brought all of them under the Gujarat Co-operative Milk Marketing Federation (GCMMF) to sell their products under a single Amul brand on the 25th anniversary of establishment. In the second phase between 1979 and 1985, the plan was extended to cover more than 290 towns. In 1979, he established the Institute of Rural Management at Anand for training the managers involved in the milk cooperatives. By 1985, there were about 4.25 million milk producers attached to 43,000 village cooperatives and milk powder production scaled up more than six times.

=== Consolidation and self-sufficiency ===
In the last phase of the Operation Flood between 1985 and 1996, Kurien focused on making the cooperatives independent and self-sustaining. It involved scaling up infrastructure to increase procurement and production, establishment dairy processing facilities, focus on marketing and training management professionals. In the 1990s, he lobbied and fought hard to keep multinational companies from entering the dairy business even as the country opened up due to liberalisation in 1991. India became the world's largest milk producer by 1998, surpassing the United States and contributed to about 17 percent of global output in 2010–11.

In 1998, he persuaded then Prime Minister Atal Bihari Vajpayee to appoint Amrita Patel as his successor at NDDB, whom he had groomed under him to protect NDDB's independence from the government. Later, he had differences with her on the policies of Amul. While she was focused on production and yield targets with certain functions such as marketing handed over to private, Kurien felt that the arrangement would weaken the cooperative institutions of the country. He resigned from the position of chairman of GCMMF in 2006 after limited support from the governing board.

=== Other work ===
Kurien replicated the cooperative model in other agricultural industries like the production of fruits and vegetables, oil seeds and edible oil. In 1979, he started the Oilseeds Growers' Cooperative Project (OGCP) under "Operation Golden Flow". In the 1980s, more than 500,000 farmers were part of the cooperatives and "Dhara", a brand of edible oil launched by NDDB in 1988, became the country's top selling brand. In the 1990s, the project began to lose steam as the government allowed the import of edible oil from other countries after the economic liberalisation of India.

In 1979, the Premier of Soviet Union Alexei Kosygin visited Anand and invited Kurien to the Soviet Union. In 1982, Kurien visited Pakistan as a part of a World Bank mission following the request of the Government of Pakistan for aid in setting up dairy cooperatives. Kurien's work registered interest from other countries like Sri Lanka and Philippines, who wanted him to replicate the cooperative model in their countries. China planned a similar programme based on Kurien's initiatives. He also served as the chairman of Tribhuvandas Foundation, a non-governmental organization which worked on woman and child health in Kheda district in Gujarat.

== Death ==
Kurien died from an illness at the age of 90 on 9 September 2012 at Nadiad near Anand. With his wife Molly, he had a daughter named Nirmala. Kurien, who was brought up as a Christian, later became an atheist.

== Awards and honours ==
For his contributions in increasing the dairy output, Kurien is known as the "Father of the White Revolution" in India. Kurien's birthday, 26 November is celebrated as the "National Milk Day" in India.

Awards and honors
Year	Award or honor	Awarding organization
1963	Ramon Magsaysay Award	Ramon Magsaysay Award Foundation
1965	Padma Shri	Government of India
1966	Padma Bhushan	Government of India
1986	Wateler Peace Prize	Carnegie Foundation
1989	World Food Prize	World Food Prize Foundation
1997	Order of Agricultural Merit	Ministry of Agriculture, France
1999	Padma Vibhushan	Government of India
2011	Karmaveer Chakra Award	United Nations and Indian Confederation of NGOs

Kurien was bestowed with an honorary degree by the Michigan State University in 1965. During the World Dairy Expo in 1993, he was recognized as the International Person of the Year. Kurien was also awarded the Godfrey Phillips Bravery Award for social bravery.

Kurien either headed or was on the boards of several public institutions and received honorary doctorate degrees from universities worldwide. The cooperative model pioneered by Kurien is studied in academia with lectures on the same.

== Books and publications ==
- Kurien, Verghese (1997). An Unfinished Dream. Tata McGraw Hill. ISBN 978-0-07462-214-8.
- Kurien, Verghese (2005). I Too Had a Dream. APH Publishing. ISBN 978-8-17436-407-4.
- Kurien, Verghese (2012). The Man Who Made The Elephant Dance. The Times Group. ISBN 978-9-38229-924-0.

== In popular culture ==
Filmmaker Shyam Benegal wanted to make Manthan, a film story based on Amul but had no financial backing. The movie was later made from financial contribution from member-farmers of co-operatives, who contributed two rupees each and was released in 1976. A veterinarian, a milk technician, and a fodder specialist toured the country along with the screening of the film to persuade farmers to form cooperatives of their own with United Nations using the movie to encourage similar cooperatives in Latin America and Africa.

Kurien supported the "Amul girl" advertisement campaign, which is one of the longest running campaigns in India and Surabhi, a television series on Indian culture.

In 2013, Amar Chitra Katha published the comic Verghese Kurien: The man with the billion litre idea.
