= Harichand Megha Dalaya =

Indian Social Entrepreneur (1921–2004)

H. M. Dalaya Harichand Megha Dalaya
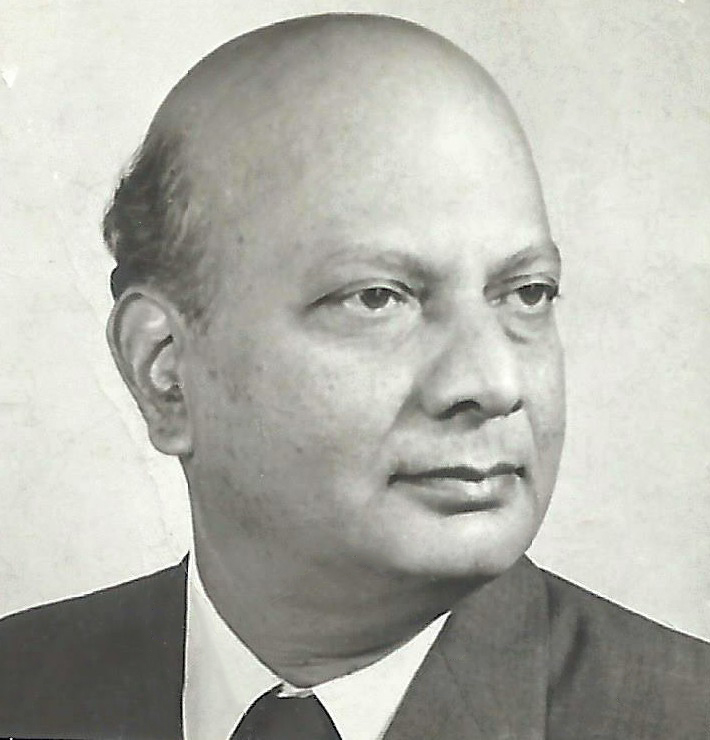
- Born: 22 October 1921; Karachi in Colonial India (now in Pakistan)
- Died: 14 September 2004 (aged 82); Pune, India
- Education: Pune Agriculture Engineering College 1944 Master's Degree in Dairy Technology, Michigan State University 1948 Advanced Business Management Program, Harvard Business School 1950 Powder Plant Designs, Copenhagen 1955
- Known for: Invention of spray-drying buffalo milk
- Awards: Achievement in Dairy Industry Award by Indian Merchant's Chambers - 1980 Fellowship Award by Indian Dairy Association - 1989 Dr. Kurien Award by Indian Dairy Association - 1991

Harichand Megha Dalaya (22 October 1921 – 14 September 2004) was the inventor of the first spray-dryer for buffalo milk in the world. His invention revolutionized India's dairy farming industry (Operation Flood) and laid the foundation for Amul cooperative's immense success.

== Early life and education ==
H. M. Dalaya was born on 22 October 1921 in Karachi in Colonial India. His parents originated from Mathura and were successful dairy farmers.

In 1944, he graduated from the Pune Agriculture Engineering College, Pune. In 1948, he acquired a master's degree in Dairy Technology from Michigan State University, Michigan. In 1950 he completed the Advanced Business Management Program from the Harvard Business School in Boston.

After his studies, H. M. Dalaya returned to a newly independent India. The partition had caused the loss of his family's land in Karachi, which was now part of Pakistan. Discouraged and with little hope for the future, he contemplated returning to the United States to begin afresh.

== Turning point ==
His friend Verghese Kurien, convinced him to visit Amul "for a week or so, to see how he liked it". Amul became his life's calling and H. M. Dalaya stayed on until his retirement.

Buffalo milk was abundant in the Kheda district but the possibility of transporting it to bigger markets was limited due to technological constraints. To expand, the Kaira Co-operative Milk Producers Union (Amul) had to envision converting this surplus milk into powder. In its powdered form, the milk could be transported over longer distances to bigger markets and milk deprived regions

At the time however, the technology of spray-drying buffalo milk did not yet exist. Only cow's milk was being converted. The collective consensus of dairy experts worldwide was that buffalo milk could not be spray-dried due to its high fat content. H. M. Dalaya believed otherwise and was determined to prove so.

== Technological breakthrough ==
In 1955, his keen technological knowledge and engineering capabilities resulted in the installation of the patented Spray Dry Equipment, the world's first buffalo milk spray-dryer, at Amul Dairy in Gujarat.

H. M. Dalaya was the silent force behind the success of Amul. While Tribhuvandas Kishibai Patel is regarded as its "father" and Verghese Kurien as its "son", H. M. Dalaya is considered its "holy ghost" whose contribution changed the future of Indian dairy farming.

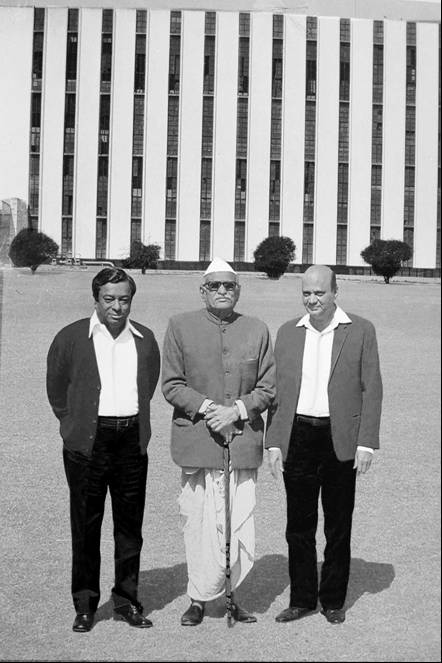
The Amul trinity: Verghese Kurien, Tribhuvandas Kishibhai Patel, and Harichand Megha Dalaya

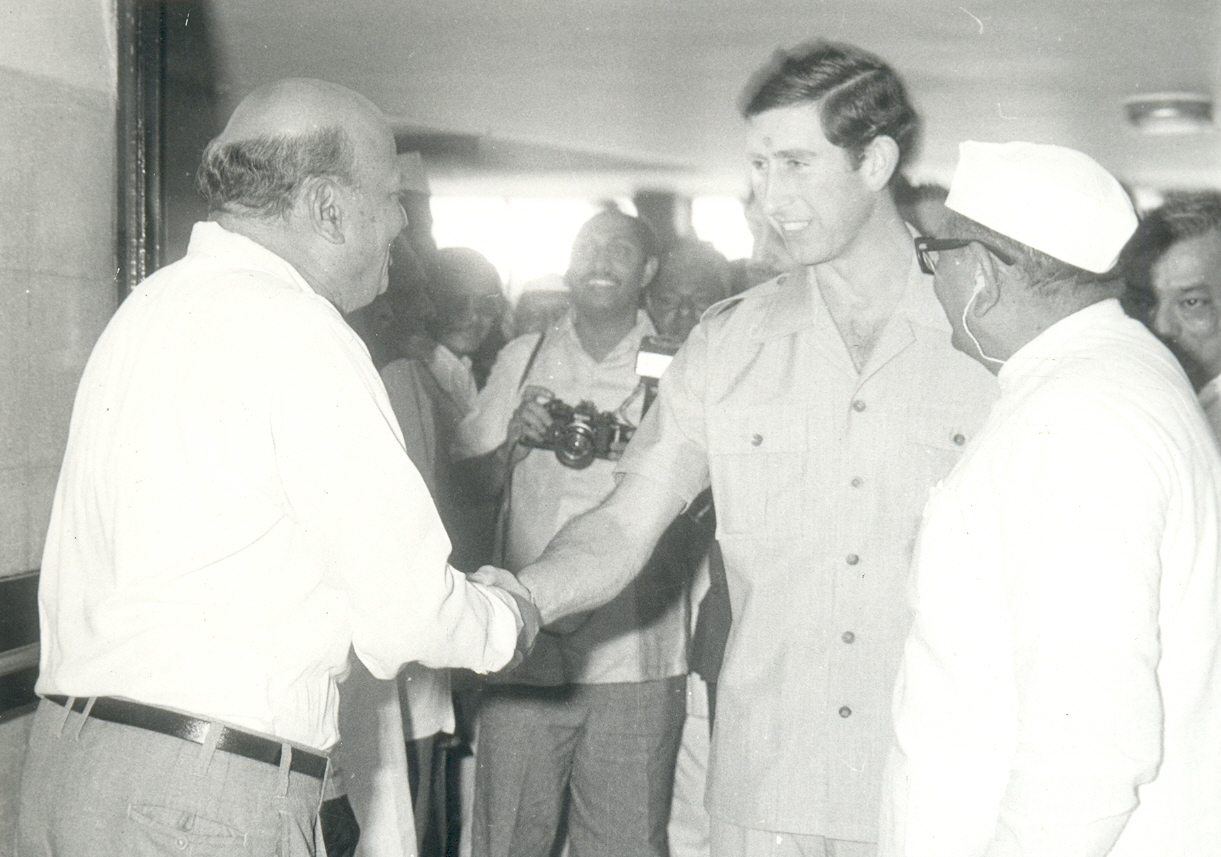
H. M. Dalaya welcoming Prince Charles, Prince of Wales and Morarji Desai to the Amul Dairy (1980)

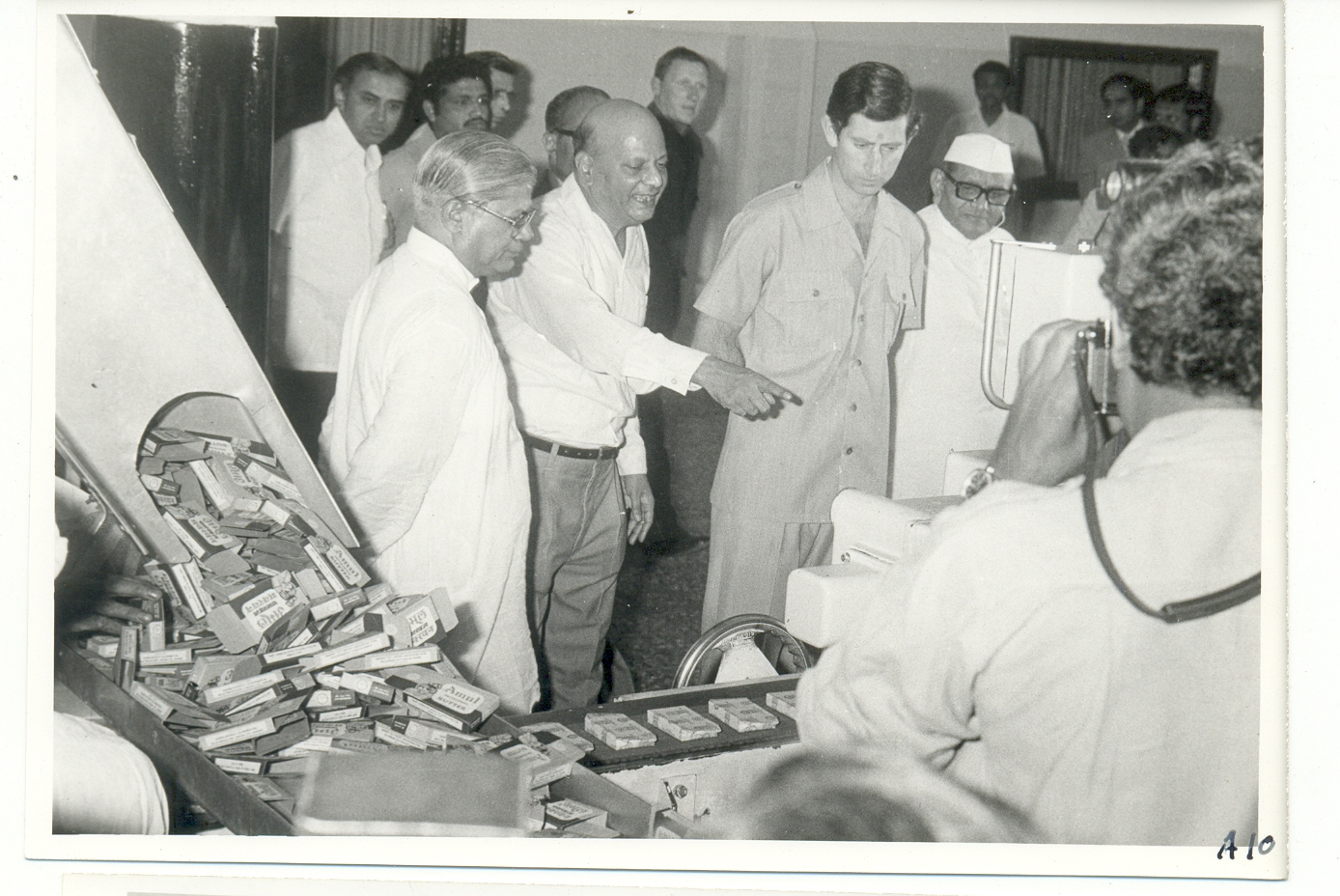
Madhav Singh Solanki, H. M. Dalaya, Prince Charles and Morarji Desai observe Amul's butter production (1980).

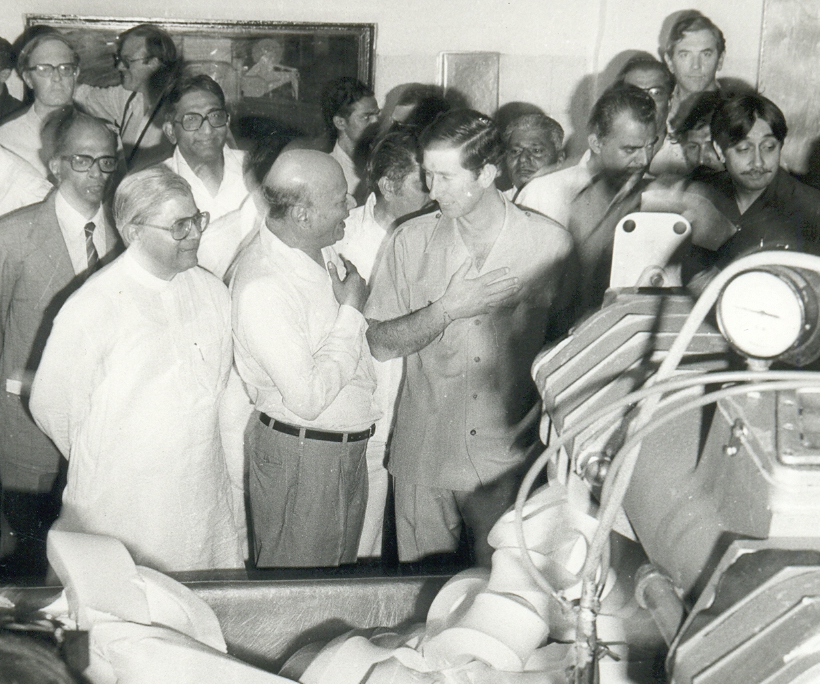
Manubhai Patel, Madhav Singh Solanki, H. M. Dalaya and Prince Charles in front of the butter manufacturing plant at Amul (1980).
