= World Dairy Expo =

- Status: Active
- Genre: Exposition
- Frequency: Annually
- Venue: Alliant Energy Center
- Location: Madison, Wisconsin
- Country: United States
- Inaugurated: October 1967
- Website: www.worlddairyexpo.com

The World Dairy Expo is a five-day event showcasing dairy cattle and the newest technologies available to the dairy industry. The show is held annually at the Alliant Energy Center in Madison, Wisconsin, United States. Considered the largest and most important dairy cattle show in North America, it has been held in the first week of October since 1967, except in 2020, when it was cancelled due to the COVID-19 pandemic.

== Cattle show ==
Dairy cattle from all over the United States and Canada are exhibited at the show. All seven nationally recognized breeds, (Brown Swiss, Holstein, Red & White, Guernsey, Jersey, Milking Shorthorn, and Ayrshire), have a show. After a grand champion from each breed is selected, a final judging is held to determine the best two cows in the show. This is held on the last day (Saturday) and is often referred to as the main event. The show starts out with an introduction of each cow and leadsman (person at the end of the halter) listing both of their achievements. After this is done, the cows are judged by all of the breed judges from the past week, and the Supreme Champion and Reserve Supreme Champion are announced.

== Trade show ==
The World Dairy Expo is the largest dairy-focused trade show in the world. Over 600 companies from all over the world exhibit to the show's 60,000 attendees. Companies like John Deere, Case IH, Land O'Lakes, Select Sires, Semex, ABS, AEM, ANIMART and many more make the trip to Madison, Wisconsin, USA every year. The World Dairy Expo is the only Wisconsin event recognized as a member of the "Tradeshow Week Top 200", a list honoring the nation's top trade events organized by Trade Show Executive Gold 100 (ranked #23 in 2013).

== Youth contests ==
The World Dairy Expo offers conferences for the youth in the dairy industry. There are several regional and national judging contests in which teams and individuals from high school FFA chapters and 4-H programs can compete in as well as a division for Collegiate level teams. Contestants compete for honors in dairy judging, dairy foods and dairy forage. There is a separate junior cattle show for contestants who are college age or younger. This cattle show is separate from the main show and Supreme and Reserve Supreme champions are named the same way as the older contestants. Winning the junior show is almost as prestigious as winning the open show.

== History ==
The World Dairy Expo began as the World Food Exposition in 1967 by the newly created World Food and Agricultural Foundation. The first executive director of the show was Bruce Walter from Chippewa Falls. The first show had nearly 1,200 head exhibited, but few visitors.

In 1969, the show was transitioned to a new executive director, Bev Craig. He focused on attracting commercial exhibits and shortening the show from ten to five days for practicality. Additionally in 1969, the show was held in the Coliseum for the first time and celebrated with an opening banquet.

The show remained on shaky ground financially, despite major strides. In 1971, industry leaders met to discuss solutions. One of which was the major need for a major trade show for dairy farmers. A broad array of organizations came together to breathe life into the new idea. Greg Blaska, AMPI corporate board member, was elected president of the organization for thirty-one years. Also in 1971 were the foundations of success built. The first farm management workshops were held, the first recognition awards were presented, the National Dairy Shrine moved its festivities to Madison, and the expo began to focus on food and craft exhibits for women in dairy.

To assist with its business organization, World Dairy Expo became a not-for-profit organization in 1993. With the show growing, World Dairy Expo Management Inc. (WDEM) was established in 1998 as a for-profit subsidiary of World Dairy Expo. WDEM provided revenue for World Dairy Expo to employ full-time year round staff. Now, it has grown into the largest dairy-focused trade show in the world.
