= Amul =

Indian dairy cooperative society

- Trade name: Amul Coop
- Type: Cooperative
- Industry: Dairy
- Founded: 14 December 1946; 79 years ago
- Founder: Tribhuvandas Patel
- Headquarters: Anand, Gujarat, India
- Area served: Worldwide
- Key people: Ashok Chaudhary (Chairman)
- Products: Milk products
- Revenue: ▲₹90,000 crore (US$9.3 billion) (2025)
- Number of employees: 1,000 (officers and employees); 3.6 million (milk producers)
- Divisions: Banas Dairy; Dudhsagar Dairy
- Website: amul.com

Amul is an Indian dairy brand owned by the cooperative society, Gujarat Cooperative Milk Marketing Federation (GCMMF), based in Anand, Gujarat. GCMMF is controlled by 3.6 million milk producers.

Amul was formally registered on 14 December 1946 as the Kaira District Co-operative Milk Producers' Union. The cooperative was founded by Tribhuvandas Kishibhai Patel, who served as its chairman until his retirement in the 1970s. Amul's former executive head Verghese Kurien was responsible for spurring India's White Revolution, which made the country the world's largest producer of milk/milk products. The White Revolution and the technical success of the union was further supported by H. M. Dalaya, who achieved a global breakthrough by developing the process to produce skim milk powder from buffalo milk—a feat previously deemed impossible by international experts.

Amul's cooperative model has since been replicated across India, eventually leading it to venture into overseas markets.

== History ==
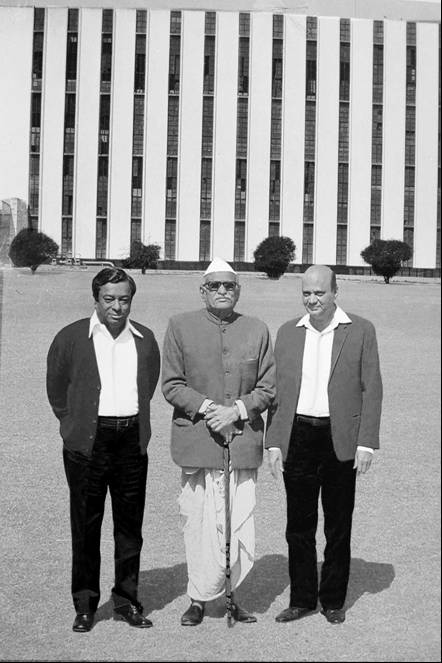
Verghese Kurien, Tribhuvandas Kishibhai Patel, and Harichand Megha Dalaya

=== Early years (1946-1970) ===
Amul was founded on 14 December 1946 as a response to the exploitation of small dairy farmers by traders and agents. At the time, milk prices were arbitrarily determined, giving Polson an effective monopoly in milk collection from Kaira and its subsequent supply to Mumbai.

Frustrated with the trade practices (which they perceived as unfair), the farmers of Kaira, led by Tribhuvandas Kishibhai Patel, approached Vallabhbhai Patel, who advised them to form a cooperative. If they did so, they would be able to directly supply their milk to the Bombay Milk Scheme instead of working for Polson. Sardar Patel sent Morarji Desai to organise the farmers.

Following a meeting in Chaklasi, the farmers formed the cooperative and resolved not to provide Polson with any more milk. Milk collection was decentralised, as most producers were marginal farmers who could deliver, at most, 1–2 litres of milk per day. Cooperatives were formed for each village.

The cooperative was strict that any farmer could become a member, irrespective of their religion, caste, gender, or political affiliation.

By June 1948, Kaira District Co-operative Milk Producers' Union had started pasteurising milk for the Bombay Milk Scheme. Then-Prime Minister Lal Bahadur Shastri visited Anand to inaugurate Amul's cattle feed factory.

One year later, in 1949, Tribhuvandas Patel hired Verghese Kurien, initially as a dairy engineer to assist with machinery. Kurien eventually became the General Manager, where he provided the strategic vision and professional management that scaled the "Anand Pattern" of cooperatives. He is recognized as the "Father of the White Revolution" for spearheading Operation Flood, which transformed India from a milk-deficient nation into the world's largest producer of milk. Kurien is credited with the revolutionary marketing and branding efforts of Amul, ensuring that the primary producer received the largest share of the consumer's rupee.

On 31 October 1964, Prime Minister Lal Bahadur Shastri spoke to farmers about their cooperative. After returning to Delhi, he set in motion the creation of an organisation, the National Dairy Development Board (NDDB), to replicate the Kaira cooperative in other parts of India.

=== The White Revolution (1970 onwards) ===
The cooperative was further developed through the efforts of Verghese Kurien and H. M. Dalaya. Dalaya's innovation of making skim milk powder from buffalo milk was a technological breakthrough that revolutionised India's organised dairy industry. With Kurien's help, the process was expanded on a commercial scale, which led to the first modern dairy cooperative at Anand. This cooperative would go on to compete against the established players in the market.

The success of the trio (T. K. Patel, Kurien, and Dalaya) at the cooperative's dairy soon spread to Anand's neighbourhood in Gujarat. Within a short span, five unions in other districts—Mehsana, Banaskantha, Baroda, Sabarkantha, and Surat—were set up, following the approach sometimes described as the Anand pattern.

In 1970, the cooperative spearheaded the "White Revolution" of India. To combine forces and expand the market while saving on advertising and avoiding competing against each other, the Gujarat Co-operative Milk Marketing Federation Ltd., an apex marketing body of these district cooperatives, was set up in 1973. The Kaira Union, which had the brand name Amul with it since 1955, transferred it to GCMMF. Technological developments at Amul have subsequently spread to other parts of India.

Under the leadership of Tribhuvandas Patel, in 1973, Amul celebrated its 25th anniversary with Morarji Desai, Maniben Patel, and Verghese Kurien.

In 1999, it was awarded the "Best of All" Rajiv Gandhi National Quality Award. In 2025, Amul was ranked third most valued brand in India in the YouGov India Value Rankings 2025.

== Organisation: Three tiers of hierarchical co-operative societies ==
Amul operates on a three-tier co-operative society model of dairy development is a structure, where milk producers form the village level dairy cooperative societies, federated under a milk union at the district level which are further federation as member unions at the state level. Amul at village and district level is managed by the elected officials. The three-tiered structure, known as the "Anand Pattern of co-operative societies", has the following hierarchical levels:

1. Village level society - Village Dairy Cooperative Society (VDCS): Milk producers in a village come together to form this primary society, which collects surplus milk and provides support services to its members. Members elect the management council, i.e. village level societies are self-managed by the elected members.
2. District level union of societies - District Cooperative Milk Producers Union (DCMPU) or Dugdh Sangh: Village-level societies within a district become members of a district milk union, which is responsible for procuring, processing, and transporting milk. Each village level council with one vote each is member of district level union and they elect the district level council, i.e. district level unions are self-managed by the elected members. Banas Dairy of Banaskantha district and Dudhsagar Dairy of Mehsana district in Gujarat are examples of district level union of societies.
3. State level federation of state level unions - State Cooperative Milk Federation (SCMF): The district milk unions within a state are federated under a state-level organization. This federation is in charge of marketing and distributing milk and milk products. In the case of Amul, the state federation is the Gujarat Cooperative Milk Marketing Federation Ltd. (GCMMF). Each district level union with one vote each is a member of state level union and they elect the state level council. The elected state level federation's elected council hires the corporate-style outsider professionals managers to run the operation to give it the professional competitive edge.
- Not part of Amul structure: There are other co-operative societies in India with 4 layers which also have 4th level at national level, such as National Cooperative Dairy Federation of India (NCDFI)
  - 4. National level federation of state level federations: While Amul has 3-tier statewide structure across Gujarat state only, there are other national-level cooperative dairy organizations in India. The National Cooperative Dairy Federation of India (NCDFI) is the apex body for the country's cooperative dairy sector and is based in Anand city in Gujarat. Amul and various state-level milk co-operative of respective states are members of NCDFI, such as Haryana Dairy Development Cooperative Federation Ltd (sells products under "Vita" brand), Kerala Co-operative Milk Marketing Federation, Karnataka Milk Federation, Mother Dairy in Delhi, etc. All these were developed with the help of National Dairy Development Board. Similarly, there are several other hierarchical co-operative societies in India focused on various other products, such as coffee, Cocconut, coir, spices, tea, and many more.

== Processing ==
Amul has several plants for processing dairy products.

In 2025, Amul's Sabar Dairy Plant at IMT Rohtak in Haryana state was expanded making it India's largest processing plant for curd, buttermilk, and yoghurt catering for the Haryana, Delhi-NCR, and northern India region. In 2025, every day it processes 150 mt (metric ton) curd, 10 mt yoghurt, 10 mt sweets, and 3 mt of buttermilk. In 2025, Haryana was India's third largest producer of milk (122.2 lakh tonnes per year) with highest per capita milk availability in India (1,105 grams per day).

== Partnerships ==
Amul has entered into partnerships with cooperative organisations internationally. In May 2024, it signed an agreement to market Amul-branded fresh milk in the United States in collaboration with the Michigan Milk Producers Association, using locally produced milk and Amul formulations.

In June 2025, the cooperative launched Amul milk in Spain through a partnership with a Spanish dairy cooperative.

== Marketing ==
In 1966, Amul hired Sylvester daCunha, the managing director of an advertising agency, to design an ad campaign for Amul Butter. DaCunha created an operation consisting of a series of hoardings featuring topical ads related to day-to-day issues. It was popular and earned a Guinness World Record for the longest-running ad campaign in the world. In the 1980s, cartoon artist Kumar Morey and scriptwriter Bharat Dabholkar were involved in sketching the Amul ads; the latter rejected the trend of using celebrities in advertisement campaigns. Dabholkar credited chairman Verghese Kurien with creating a free atmosphere that fostered the development of the ads.

Despite encountering political pressure on several occasions, daCunha's agency has made it a policy not to back down. Some of the more controversial Amul ads include one commenting on the Naxalite uprising in West Bengal, one on the Indian Airlines employees' strike, and one depicting the Amul girl wearing a Gandhi cap.

In 2013, Amul tweeted a picture featuring the Amul Butter Girl, implying that "freedom of choice" died in 2013, in opposition to the Supreme Court of India overruling the judgment of the High Court of Delhi and criminalising homosexuality again.

On 17 October 2016, the Amul Butter Girl celebrated 50 years since she first appeared in the topical ad, titled "Thoroughbred". The ad showed a jockey holding a slice of bread during the horse race season in 1966. The impish Amul girl had appeared for the first time even before that, with Eustace Fernandez showing her offering bedtime prayers with a wink and a lick of lips, saying "Give us this day our daily bread: with Amul butter".

Their ad on Aagey Badhta Hai India had an excellent response from the audience. It spoke about how their milk is seen as a household product, with a catchy tune associated with it. It has over 39 lakh (3.9 million) views on YouTube.

In February 2020, Amul posted a picture of the Amul girl treating Joaquin Phoenix with butter after his academy award win for his role in the 2019 film, Joker. Since Phoenix is a vegan, Amul faced criticism from vegans in India and PETA for the poor knowledge of his vegan activism and life.

In July 2024, Amul featured Maya Neelakantan, a ten-year-old guitar prodigy who auditioned for America's Got Talent season 19 in June 2024.

Recently Amul was emerged as India's most chosen beverages brand and entered into OOH FMCG top five list. The ranking is as per the 14th edition of the Brand Footprint India 2026 report which was released by Worldpanel by Numerator on 13th August 2026. The report tracked consumer choices made during 2025.

== In popular culture ==
The White Revolution inspired filmmaker Shyam Benegal to base his 1976 film Manthan on it. The film was financed by over five lakh (half a million) rural farmers in Gujarat, who contributed ₹2 each to its budget. Upon its release, these farmers went in truckloads to watch 'their' film, making it a commercial success. Manthan won the National Film Award for Best Hindi Feature Film during the 24th National Film Awards in 1977.

== See also ==
- Other milk cooperatives in India
  - Nandini of Karnataka
  - Aavin of Tamil Nadu
  - Milma of Kerala
  - Vita of Haryana

- Cooperative movement in India
  - Coffee Board of India
  - Coconut Development Board
  - Coir Board of India
  - Spices Board of India
  - Tea Board of India
