= Anand, Gujarat =

Anand The Milk City
- City
- Charotar Region Of Gujarat
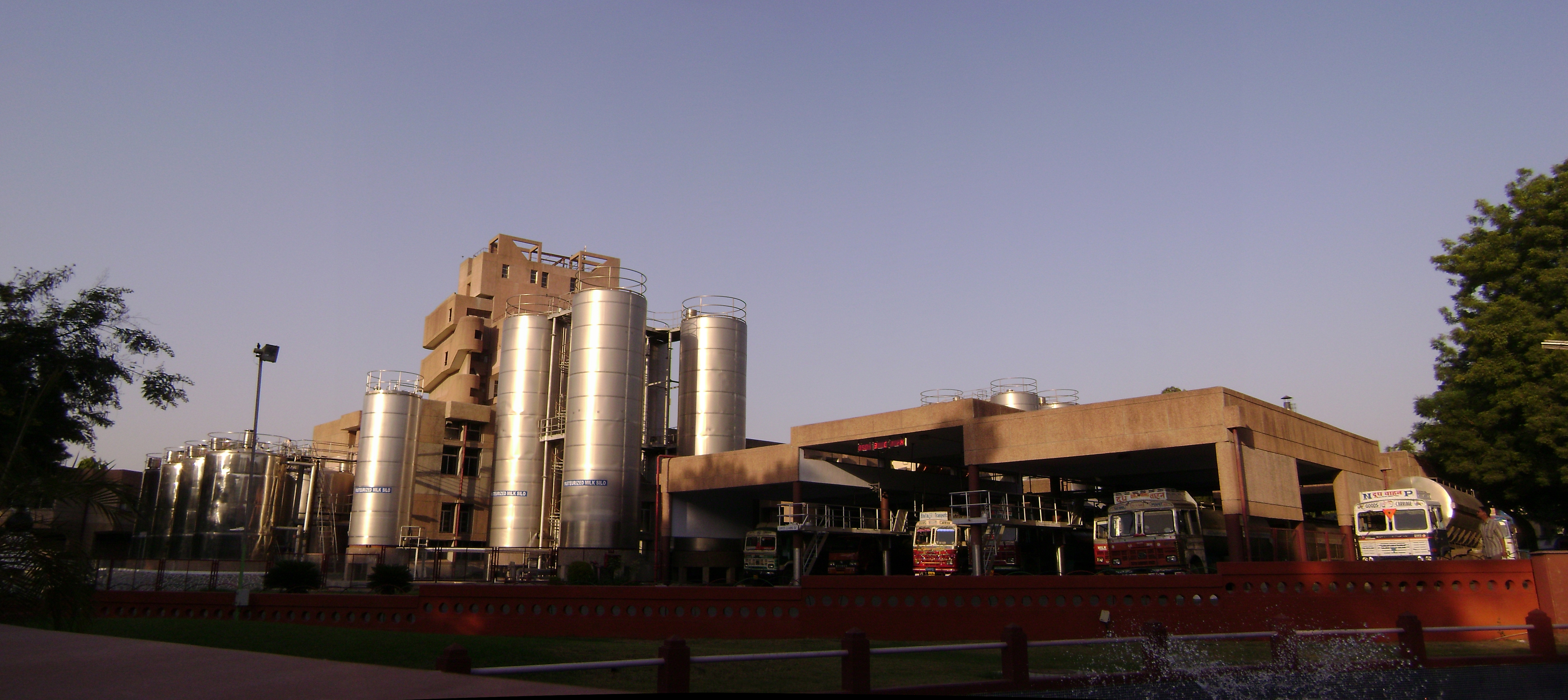
- Amul Plant at Anand
- Nickname: The Milk City
- Location in Gujarat, India Anand (India) Anand (Asia)
- Coordinates: 22.556°N 72.951°E
- Country: India
- State: Gujarat
- District: Anand
- Region: Charotar Region Of Gujarat

Government
  - Type: karamsad Anand Municipal Corporation

Area
  - Total: 85.67 km^{2} (33.08 sq mi)
  - Rank: 11
- Elevation: 39 m (128 ft)

Population (2025)
  - Total: 418,840 (2,025)
  - Rank: 9th
  - Density: 8,753/km^{2} (22,670/sq mi)
- Demonym: Charotar Patel

Languages
  - Official: Gujarati, Hindi, English
- Time zone: UTC+5:30 (IST)
- PIN: 388001
- Area code: 2692
- Vehicle registration: GJ-23
- Website: https://anandmc.com

Anand is a city and the administrative centre of Anand district in the state of Gujarat, India. It is administered by Anand Municipal Corporation. It is part of the region known as Charotar, consisting of Anand and Kheda districts. Anand is Former Part Of Kaira District (now Kheda) in British Raj.

Anand is known as the "Milk Capital of India". It became famous for Amul dairy and its milk revolution by the Amul trinity: Tribhuvandas Patel, Verghese Kurien and H. M. Dalaya. This city hosts the Head Office of Gujarat Cooperative Milk Marketing Federation Ltd (GCMMF), the NDDB of India, the Institute of Rural Management Anand (IRMA), Vidya Dairy and the Anand Agricultural University. Another famous educational hub is Vallabh Vidhyanagar, an educational suburb of Anand which has institutes like BVM (Birla Vishvkarma Mahavidhyalaya), which is the first engineering college of Gujarat, GCET (G. H. Patel College of Engineering and Technology), ADIT(A.D Patel Institute Of Technology). Other than these, Vallabh Vidhyanagar is also home to two major universities, those being SPU and CVM. Hence Anand is often referred to as the educational hub of Gujarat.

== Geography ==
Anand is located at 22.57°N 72.93°E. It has an average elevation of 39 m (128 ft). The city has an area of 47.89 km^{2} (18.49 sq mi).

== Demographics ==
As of 2011 India census, Anand had a population of 634,987. Males constitute 51.77% of the population and females 48.23%. Anand has an average literacy rate of 78.45%, higher than the national average of 59.5% (55% of the males and 45% of females literate). 11% of the population is under 6 years of age. Average literacy rate of Anand in 2011 were 84.37 compared to 74.51 of 2001. Gender wise, male and female literacy were 91.82 and 76.36 respectively. For 2001 census, same figures stood at 86.09 and 61.94 in Anand district.

Religions in Anand City
Religion	Percent
Hinduism	72.30%
Islam	21.93%
Christianity	4.05%
Jainism	1.03%
Sikhism	0.41%
others	0.18%

== Economy ==
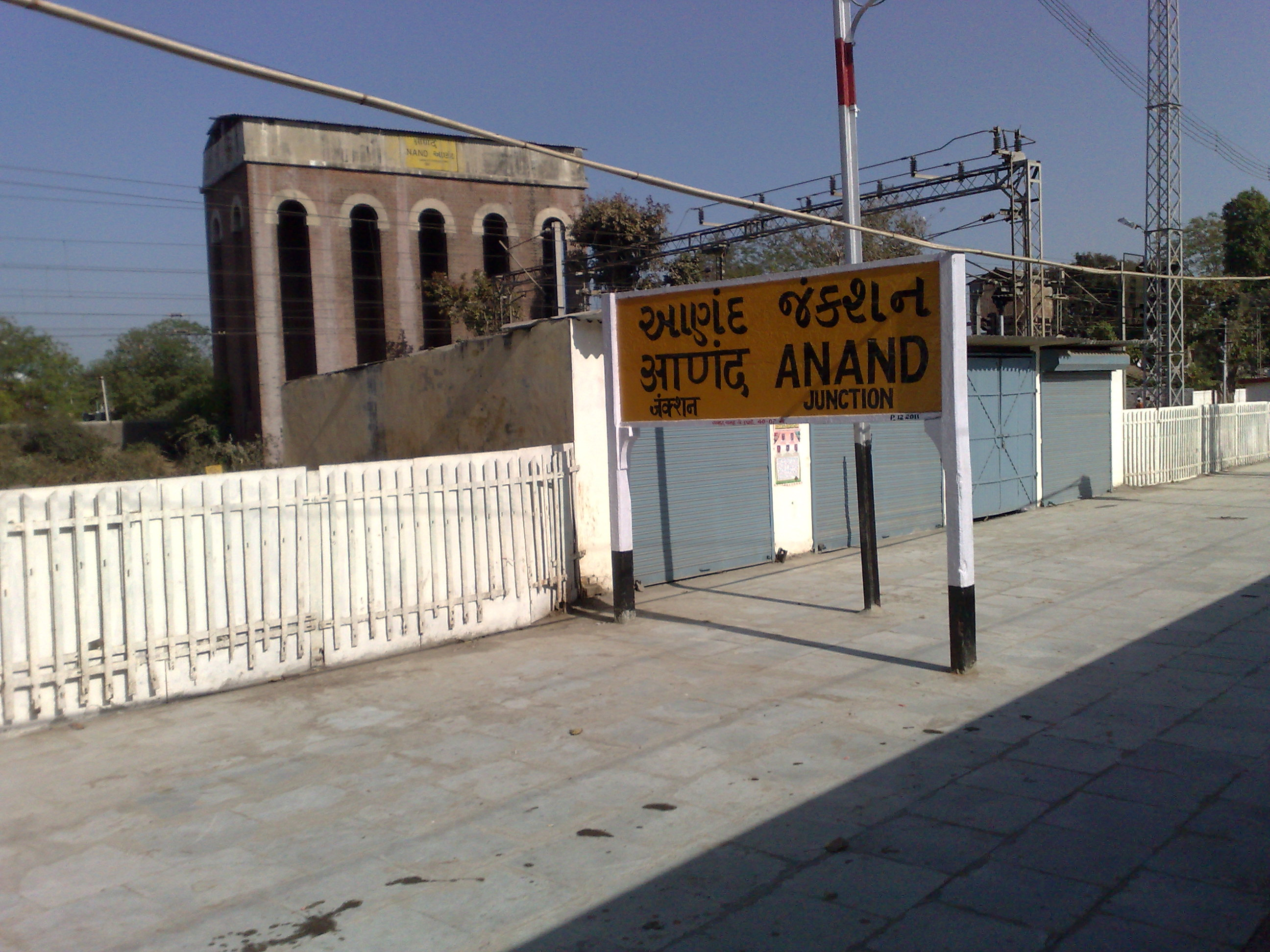
Anand Junction

The economy of Anand ranges from farming to big scale industries. Major crops include tobacco and bananas. Anand is home to the famous Amul Dairy, Vidya Dairy, Amul Chocolate Plant, Mogar and Gujarat Co-operative Milk Marketing Federation. Anand is home to the Institute of Rural Management Anand. Vitthal Udhyog Nagar, a big industrial belt is located on the outskirts of the city. Many industries including HLE Glascoat Ltd. Elecon Engineering, GMM PFaudler, Vulcan Industrial Engineering Co. Ltd, Warm Steam, The Charotar Iron Factory (est.1938), Milcent, Atlanta Electrics, Worldwide Overseas Travels and Alian Software are situated in this industrial belt. Also there are three vegetable markets which have developed in this city. The Shri Krishna Hospital, Karamsad is located near Anand. The first Aerospace company in Gujarat, BC Instruments India Pvt Ltd, started operating in 2004 and has AS9100 and NADCAP approvals. Electric motor and solar pump company ROTOMAG is located in Anand.

== Transport ==
Ahmedabad Mumbai bullet train station is located in Anand, and Anand lies between Ahmedabad and Vadodara on the Western Railways, 101 km (63 mi) from the state capital Gandhinagar. It is a railway Junction and a broad gauge line from here runs to Godhra, covering Dakor, a major Hindu pilgrimage en route. MEMUs and one or two regular passenger trains ply on this route. It also has a branch line to Khambhat. This route is completely electrified in 2025. Anand Railway Station has 5 platforms, numbers 1, 2, 3 and 4 are on the main line and number 5 is on the branch line to Godhra. A new platform is in construction on the branch to Ahmedabad from the Godhra line forming a triangle. The Ahmedabad Vadodara Expressway from Ahmedabad to Vadodara also passes through Anand.

== Notable people ==
The city has produced many notable individuals, including H M Patel, former Finance Minister of India; Verghese Kurien, the man who made the milk revolution possible; Harish Dave, a renowned Gujarati poet; Vishvesh Parmar, a Bollywood singer was also born in Anand. USA National Cricket Team Captain Monank Patel was born and brought up in the city of Anand before moving to the US in 2010.
