= List of employee-owned companies =

This is a list of notable employee-owned companies by country. These are companies totally or significantly owned (directly or indirectly) by their employees.

Employee ownership takes different forms and one form may predominate in a particular country. For example, in the U.S. over 5,700 of the roughly 6,400 employee-owned companies have an Employee Stock Ownership Plan (ESOP). An ESOP is an employee-owner method that provides a company's workforce with an ownership interest in the company. In an ESOP, companies provide their employees with ownership interests in the company's business, often at no up-front cost to the employees. ESOP shares, however, are part of employees' remuneration for work performed. Shares are allocated to employees and may be held in an ESOP trust until the employee retires or leaves the company. The shares are then sold.

Worker cooperatives are another form of employee ownership wherein workers are exclusive owners and managers of the firm, with one vote per employee in democratic decision-making.

== Canada ==
- EllisDon
- Friesens
- Hatch Ltd
- Morrison Hershfield
- PCL Construction

== India ==
- Aavin
- Adarsh Co-operative Bank
- Amul
- Banas Dairy
- Co-optex
- Dabbawala
- Horticultural Producers' Cooperative Marketing and Processing Society
- Indian Coffee House
- Indian Farmers Fertiliser Cooperative
- Indian Potash Limited
- J Thomas & Co. Pvt. Ltd.
- Kaira District Co-operative Milk Producers' Union
- Karnataka Milk Federation
- Kerala Co-operative Milk Marketing Federation
- Krishak Bharati Cooperative
- Lijjat Papad
- Mother Dairy
- National Agricultural Cooperative Marketing Federation of India
- Orissa State Cooperative Milk Producers' Federation
- Pratibha Mahila Sahakari Bank
- Rehwa Society
- Sant Muktabai Sahakari Sakhar Karkhana
- The Totgars' Cooperative Sale Society Limited
- Working Women's Forum

== Japan ==
- Nikkei, Inc.

== Scandinavia ==
- Kantega

== Spain ==
- IDOM
- Mondragon Corporation

== United Kingdom ==
- Aardman Animations
- Agilisys
- Allford Hall Monaghan & Morris
- Arup
- Boydell & Brewer
- Central Surrey Health
- Donald Insall Associates
- Hayes Davidson
- Gripple Ltd.
- John Lewis Partnership
- MJP Architects
- Mott MacDonald
- PA Consulting Group
- Richer Sounds
- Rider Levett Bucknall
- Riverford
- Talis Group
- Team Consulting
- Tullis Russell
- West Highland Free Press
- Go Ape

== United States ==
- Acadian Ambulance
- Applied Research Associates
- Arizmendi Bakery
- Bi-Mart
- Black & Veatch
- Bob's Red Mill
- Brookshire Brothers
- Brookshire Grocery Company
- Burns & McDonnell
- Carter's Foods
- Casino Queen
- CDM Smith
- Certain Affinity
- CH2M Hill
- Corgan
- The Cheese Board Collective
- Chemonics
- Chicago & North Western Railway – sold to Union Pacific in 1995
- Columbia Forest Products
- Dahl's Foods
- Davey Tree Expert Company
- Ebby Halliday Realtors
- Eureka Casino Resort
- Evergreen Cooperatives
- Ferrellgas Partners
- Food Giant
- Frontline Test Equipment
- Gardener's Supply Company
- Gensler
- Golden Artist Colors
- Graybar
- Great Lakes Brewing Company
- Greatland Corporation
- Homeland (supermarket)
- Harps Food Stores
- HDR, Inc.
- Henny Penny (manufacturer)
- Hensel Phelps Construction
- Herman Miller
- Houchens Industries
- HNTB
- Huck's Food & Fuel
- Hy-Vee
- John J. McMullen & Associates – now part of Alion Science and Technology
- Journal Communications
- Kimley-Horn
- King Arthur Flour
- Lampin Corporation
- Landmark Education
- Lifetouch
- Mast General Store
- Mathematica Policy Research
- Mushkin
- MWH Global
- Neuberger Berman
- Niemann Foods
- Oliver Winery
- P. Terry's Burger Stand
- Parsons Corporation
- Peter Kiewit Sons'
- Phelps County Bank
- Publix
- Raycom Media
- Recology
- Robert McNeel & Associates
- Rosendin Electric
- SAIC
- Scheels
- Schreiber Foods
- Schweitzer Engineering Laboratories
- Softstar Shoes
- Springfield ReManufacturing
- Southern Exposure Seed Exchange
- Stewart's Shops
- Stiefel Labs
- STV Group
- Taylor Guitars
- Tidyman's
- Torch Technologies
- The Whiting-Turner Contracting Company
- W. L. Gore & Associates
- W. W. Norton & Company
- Wawa
- Westat
- Wimberly Allison Tong & Goo
- WinCo Foods
- Woodman's Markets

== See also ==
- List of co-operative federations
- List of cooperatives
- List of energy cooperatives
- List of food cooperatives
- List of retailers' cooperatives
- List of worker cooperatives
- Lists of companies – company-related list articles on Wikipedia
