= Paul Pothen =

Indian industrialist (1916–2004)

- Born: 8 January 1916; Nedumangad, India
- Died: 3 August 2004 (aged 88); Kochi, Kerala, India
- Occupation: Industrialist
- Known for: founding FACT and IFFCO
- Awards: Padma Shri

Paul Pothen (1916-2004) was an Indian industrialist and one of the pioneers of fertilizer industry in India. He was the founding managing director of three large scale fertilizer manufacturing firms in India.

Pothen was born in a Mallapally-based Christian family on 8 January 1916 at Nedumangad, in the Thiruvananthapuram district and graduated from the University of Madras in 1935, after which he secured his graduation in civil engineering from the University of Mysore in 1940. He continued his studies to get higher training in electrical engineering at the Indian Institute of Technology, Roorkee (formerly Rourkee University) and did an advanced course in Canada under the aegis of Colombo Plan in 1965-66.

Pothen started his career by joining the Fertilisers and Chemicals Travancore Limited (FACT) in a senior management position in 1944 where he stayed until 1965 when he was made the founding managing director of FACT Engineering and Design Organisation (FEDO) in 1965. Three years later, when the Indian Farmers Fertiliser Cooperative (IFFCO) was established in 1968, Pothen was made the founding managing director. He continued at IFFCO till 1981 and moved to Krishak Bharati Cooperative (KRIBHCO) as the organization's founding managing director. He headed the Fertilizer Association of India for several years and was also associated with the Travancore Cochin Chemicals and Fact Technical Society.

The Government of India awarded the fourth highest Indian civilian honour of Padma Shri in 1977. He died on 3 August 2004 at the age of 88, succumbing to old age illnesses at Amrita Hospital in Kochi. The Indian Farmers Fertiliser Cooperative named one of their townships as Paul Pothen Nagar, in honour of their former managing director.

== See also ==
- Fertilisers and Chemicals Travancore
- Indian Farmers Fertiliser Cooperative
- Krishak Bharati Cooperative
- Travancore Cochin Chemicals
