= Bharat Taxi =

Indian ride-hailing service

- Type: Cooperative led ride hailing service
- Industry: Ride hailing
- Founded: 2025
- Headquarters: New Delhi, India,
- Area served: National Capital Region, Gujarat, Mumbai
- Services: Taxis, Auto rickshaws, Bike taxis
- Parent: Sahakar Taxi Cooperative Limited
- Website: bharattaxiapp.com

Bharat Taxi is an Indian ride-hailing service, structured as a cooperative-led model by Sahakar Taxi Cooperative Limited. It is supported by the Ministry of Co-operation and promoted by eight leading cooperatives of India: NCDC, AMUL (GCMMF), IFFCO, KRIBHCO, NAFED, NDDB, NCEL, and NABARD. The platform was announced by the Government of India in December 2024 as part of an effort to promote cooperative based models in the gig economy.

A soft launch of the Bharat Taxi customer application took place in December 2025, with a full commercial rollout planned for 2026.

== History ==
In December 2024, the Ministry of Cooperation announced the launch of Bharat Taxi as a government supported initiative aimed at addressing concerns related to commissions and driver welfare in app based transport services.

Sahakar Taxi Cooperative Limited, the entity responsible for operating Bharat Taxi, was registered and incorporated on 6 June 2025.

Driver onboarding for the platform began in November 2025 across select regions, including the National Capital Region and Gujarat. On 1 December 2025, the Bharat Taxi customer application was released as a soft launch, allowing users to access ride booking services on a limited scale.

According to media reports, approximately 56,000 drivers had registered on the platform during the early onboarding phase.

== Business model ==
Bharat Taxi operates under a cooperative ownership structure in which drivers are enrolled as members of the cooperative rather than as independent contractors. Media reports have stated that the platform aims to reduce or eliminate per ride commission charges, with a larger share of the fare intended to be paid directly to drivers.

Government representatives have compared the cooperative model to other large cooperative institutions in India, where members collectively own and participate in the organisation.

Pricing on the platform has been described as transparent, with limited use of surge pricing mechanisms during the trial phase, according to published reports.

== See also ==
- Government of India
- Ministry of Cooperation (India)
- Transport in Delhi
