= Manohar Lal =

Manohar Lal Khattar (born 1954) is a politician has served as the Minister of Power of India since 2024 and has served as the 10th Chief Minister of Haryana.

Manohar Lal may also refer to:

== Politicians ==
- Manohar Lal Panth, member of the State Assembly of Uttar Pradesh
- Manohar Lal (politician) (born 1938), former member of Lok Sabha and former Minister of Labour, Justice and Transport in the Government of Uttar Pradesh
- Manohar Lal Sondhi (1933–2003), former member of Lok Sabha representing the New Delhi constituency
- Sir Manohar Lal (economist) (1871-1949), economist, politician, and lawyer during the British Raj

== Other ==
- Manohar Lal Munjal (born 1945), Indian acoustical engineer
- Manohar Lal Chibber (born 1927), Indian army officer and writer
- Manohar Lal Sharma, Indian lawyer known for filing a number of public interest lawsuits
