= NCDC =

NCDC may refer to:

- National Climatic Data Center, the United States National Climatic Data Center in Asheville, North Carolina is the world's largest active archive of weather data
- National Capital Development Commission, an Australian Commonwealth Government body created to complete the establishment of Canberra as the seat of government
- National Collegiate Development Conference, an American ice hockey league run by the United States Premier Hockey League
- National Cooperative Development Corporation (India)
- National Centre for Disease Control (India)
- Nigeria Centre for Disease Control, a Nigerian public health institute
- North Cornwall District Council, Cornwall, UK
