= Open-book management =

Open-book management (OBM) is a management term coined by John Case of Inc. magazine, who began using it in 1993. The concept has been implemented by Jack Stack at SRC Holdings.

The basis of open-book management is that the information employees receive should not only help them do their jobs effectively but also help them understand how the company is doing as a whole. According to Case, "a company performs best when its people see themselves as partners in the business rather than as hired hands". The technique is to give employees all relevant financial information about the company so they can make better decisions as workers. This information includes, but is not limited to, revenue, profit, cost of goods, cash flow, and expenses.

Stack and Case conceptualize open-book principles in similar ways.

Stack uses three basic principles in his management practice;

- Know and teach the rules: every employee should be given the measures of business success and taught to understand them
- Follow the action & keep score: Every employee should be expected and enabled to use their knowledge to improve performance
- Provide a stake in the outcome: Every employee should have a direct stake in the company's success-and in the risk of failure

Similarly, in 1995, Case made sense of open-book with three main points:

- The company should share finances and other critical data with all employees
- Employees are challenged to move the numbers in a direction that improves the company
- Employees share in company prosperity

In a company that fully employs open-book management, employees at all levels are knowledgeable about how their job fits into the company's financial plan. However, taking a company from "normal" to open is not easy, and cannot be achieved by merely sharing financial statements with employees. Open-book management is considered successful when companies allow improvements in their financial numbers to come from the bottom tier of employees rather than pressure exerted by a traditional top-down management system. While employees need to be trained to understand income statements and balance sheets, open-book management aims to achieve a level of understanding of company finances among all employees, to the point that they can report predictions to upper management.

To motivate employees to pursue change, open-book management focuses on a "critical number". The number is different for every company, but it is a key indicator of profitability or break-even point. Discovering the critical number is essential for creating an open-book company. Once the number is discovered, a "scoreboard" is developed that brings together all the numbers needed to calculate the critical number. The scoreboard is open for all to see, and meetings are held to discuss how individuals can influence the score's direction, and ultimately, the performance against the critical number. Finally, a stake in the outcome of company's is provided, it could be a bonus plan tied to the critical number performance, or equity sharing, or both.
