= Ministry of Co-operation =

Government ministry of India

Ministry of Cooperation
- Branch of Government of India

- Ministry of Cooperation

Agency overview
- Formed: 6 July 2021 (5 years ago)
- Jurisdiction: Government of India
- Headquarters: New Delhi
- Minister responsible: Amit Shah
- Minister of State responsible: Krishan Pal Gurjar; Murlidhar Mohol
- Agency executive: Ashish Kumar Bhutani, IAS, Secretary
- Website: www.cooperation.gov.in

The Ministry of Cooperation is a Union ministry under the Government of India which was formed in 2021. The ministry provides a separate administrative, legal and policy framework for strengthening the cooperative movement in the country. The ministry's creation was announced on 6 July 2021 along with its vision statement of Sahkar se samriddhi (transl. Prosperity through cooperation). Before the creation of this ministry, the objectives of this ministry were looked after by the Ministry of Agriculture.

The ministry works in strengthening co-operatives at the grassroot level, working to streamline processes for 'Ease of doing business' for co-operatives and enabling the development of Multi-State Co-operatives (MSCS). The same was initially announced by Finance Minister Nirmala Sitharaman while presenting the 2021 Union budget.

== Objectives ==
The ministry was created with objectives of:

- To realise the vision of "Sahkar se Samriddhi" (prosperity through cooperation).
- To streamline processes for ‘'Ease of doing business’' for co-operatives and enable development of Multi-State Co-operatives (MSCS)
- to provide a separate administrative, legal and policy framework for strengthening the cooperative movements in the country.
- To deepen the cooperative as a true people-based movement reaching upto the grassroot level.

== Public Sector Undertakings ==
- National Cooperative Development Corporation (India)
- National Cooperative Organics Limited

== Cooperative Societies at National Level ==
Core Cooperative Society at National Level

- National Cooperative Union of India
- National Council for Cooperative Training

Cooperative Banks at National Level

- National Federation of State Cooperative Banks Limited
- National Federation of Urban Cooperative Banks and Credit Societies Limited

Development Cooperative Banks at National Level

- National Cooperative Land Development Banks Federation Limited
- All India Industrial Cooperative Banks Federation Limited

Consumer Cooperative Societies at National Level

- National Cooperative Consumer’s Federation of India Limited

Worker Cooperative Societies at National Level

- National Federation of Labour Cooperative Limited

Housing Cooperative Societies at National Level

- National Cooperative Housing Federation Limited

Producer/Marketing Cooperative Societies at National Level

- National Federation of Industrial Cooperative Limited
- Indian Farmers Fertiliser Cooperative Limited
- Krishak Bharati Cooperative Limited
- All India Federation of Cooperative Spinning Mills Limited
- National Cooperative Dairy Federation of India Limited
- National Heavy Engineering Cooperative Limited
- All India Handloom Fabrics Marketing Cooperative Society Limited
- National Federation of Fishermen’s Cooperative Limited
- National Cooperative Tobacco Grower’s Federation Limited
- Tribal Cooperative Marketing Development Federation of India Limited
- National Federation of Cooperative Sugar Factories Limited
- National Agricultural Cooperative Marketing Federation of India
- Petrofils Cooperative Limited (To be de-liquidated)
- Bharat Taxi

== Initiatives of the Ministry of Cooperation ==
Since its formation, Ministry of Cooperation has taken more than 50 initiatives to transform the Indian cooperative sector. This includes institutional strengthening, legal & regulatory reforms, expansion of cooperative services, digital transformation etc. among others.

== Cabinet Ministers ==
Portrait	Minister (Birth-Death) Constituency	Term of office			Political party	Ministry	Prime Minister
Portrait	Minister (Birth-Death) Constituency	From	To	Period	Political party	Ministry	Prime Minister
	Amit Shah (born 1964); MP for Gandhinagar	7 July 2021	Incumbent	5 years, 95 days	Bharatiya Janata Party	Modi II	Narendra Modi
	Amit Shah (born 1964); MP for Gandhinagar	7 July 2021	Incumbent	5 years, 95 days	Bharatiya Janata Party	Modi III	Narendra Modi

== Ministers of State ==
Portrait	Minister (Birth-Death) Constituency	Term of office			Political party	Ministry	Prime Minister
Portrait	Minister (Birth-Death) Constituency	From	To	Period	Political party	Ministry	Prime Minister
	B. L. Verma (born 1961); MP for Uttar Pradesh (Rajya Sabha)	7 July 2021	9 June 2024	2 years, 338 days	Bharatiya Janata Party	Modi II	Narendra Modi
	Krishan Pal Gurjar (born 1957); MP for Faridabad	10 June 2024	Incumbent	2 years, 122 days	Bharatiya Janata Party	Modi III	Narendra Modi
	Murlidhar Mohol (born 1974); MP for Pune	10 June 2024	Incumbent	2 years, 122 days	Bharatiya Janata Party	Modi III	Narendra Modi

== Department of Co-operation State Committees ==
Department of Co-operation State Committees was created with objectives of:

- Legal framework preservation for strengthening the country.
- To deter discrimination to communities in the country.
- Historic preservation of every state in the country.

== Criticism ==
Co-operative societies, being a subject of State List under the Seventh schedule of the Constitution, many experts raised concerns that, creating such a ministry at the central level would increase the power in the hands of the union government.

== See also ==
- Aavin
- Amul
- Cooperative movement in India
