= Economy of Kalpetta =

The economy of Kalpetta depends upon industries, agriculture, tourism, banking, trade and shopping etc.

== Industries ==
The Wayanad dairy of Milma (Kerala Co-operative Milk Marketing Federation) is situated at Chuzhali within Kalpetta Municipal Limits. This dairy processes over 100,000 liters of milk daily and markets it in Wayanad, Kozhikode, Malappuram and Kannur districts. The dairy also manufactures high quality ghee which is exported to the Middle East countries. Other products of the dairy are Butter, Buttermilk, Curd and ice-cream. There is a Mini Industries Park promoted by Kinfra at Kalpetta. Several small scale industries function out of this Park.

== Tourism ==
Tourism and hospitality industry experienced a boom in recent years. This has led to mushrooming of resorts throughout Wayanad, with the largest concentration of hotels and resorts at Kalpetta and adjoining areas within Vythiri taluk.

== Banking ==
Kalpetta is the banking capital of Wayanad. Lead District Bank of Wayanad is Canara Bank and the Lead Bank office is situated at Kalpetta. India's largest bank State Bank of India has two branches in the municipal area (Kainatty and Kalpetta). The premier bank of Kerala State Bank of Travancore also has two branches - Specialised Gold Point Branch apart from the regular branch. There is a total of 21 branches of scheduled banks in Kalpetta, excluding Gramin and Co-operative banks. Kerala Gramin Bank has a branch and a Regional Office at Kalpetta. The head office of Wayanad District Co-operative Bank is at Kalpetta. Kerala State Co-operative Bank has its Wayanad branch at Kalpetta. The Wayanad Region office of Kerala State Co-operative Agricultural and Rural Development Bank Ltd is also at Kalpetta.

== Trade and shopping ==
Kalpetta is one of the major trade centers in Kerala for agricultural produces. Kalpetta is one of 18 markets that the VFPCK (Vegetable and Fruit Promotion Council Keralam) tracks and publishes vegetable and fruit prices. Coffee price prevailing at Kalpetta market is published in all Malayalam newspapers and also in business newspapers such as the Economic Times.

== Consumer goods ==
In recent times, major jewellery, electronics and hypermarket retail chains of Kerala have set up stores in Kalpetta. Well known store chains like Francis Alukkas, Malabar Gold, Chemmannur Gold, Grand Fresh Hypermarkets, Kannankandy Electronics, Whitemart Electronics, TBS Books and Beyond, Planet Fashion are present at Kalpetta.

== Publishing ==
All of Kerala's leading book publishers have outlets at Kalpetta. Outlets of Current Books, National Book Stall (NBS), Mathrubhumi Books, Deshabhimani Books and Poorna Publications (TBS) can be found there.

== Automobiles ==
Car dealerships serving Wayanad are located in the Kalpetta North suburbs between Kainatty and Kakkavayal.
