= Shram Sadhana Trust =

Shram Sadhana Trust is a trust promoted by Smt. Pratibhatai Patil, who later became President of India. Currently Shri. Raosaheb alias Rajendra D. Shekhawat, son of Smt. Pratibhatai Patil is the Managing Trustee of the trust. The Trust runs one working women hostel at Bandra, Mumbai and also runs College of Engineering and Technology, Institute of Pharmacy and Arts, Science & Commerce College at Bambhori in Jalgaon district, Maharashtra.
