= Kerala Co-operative Milk Marketing Federation =

Company in Trivandrum, Kerala, India

- Trade name: Milma
- Company type: State Government Cooperative
- Industry: Dairy
- Founded: 1980; 46 years ago
- Headquarters: Thiruvananthapuram, Kerala, India
- Area served: Kerala
- Products: Milk products and Tetra Pak
- Revenue: ₹3,003 crores (2017–18)
- Owner: Department of Diary Development, Government of Kerala
- Website: milma.com

Kerala Co-operative Milk Marketing Federation (KCMMF), known by its trade name Milma, is a state government cooperative society established in 1980 headquartered in Thiruvananthapuram. It is an India state government cooperative owned by the Department of Dairy Development, Government of Kerala. KCMMF is a Federation of three Regional Milk Unions: the ERCMPU, TRCMPU and MRCMPU.

It follows a cooperative structure and is one of the most profitable cooperatives in Kerala. In 1983, it took over the production and milk marketing facilities under the Kerala Livestock and Milk Marketing Board. The board was later renamed as Kerala Livestock Development Board. According to the 2017–18 annual report, the income of this co-operative federation is ₹3,003 crore.

== History ==
In the early 1980s, Kerala was seen as an unfriendly dairy state and had to depend primarily on the neighbouring states for its milk supply. However, today, Kerala is almost self-sufficient in milk production.

Established in 1980 as the implementing agency for Operation Flood II in the State of Kerala.

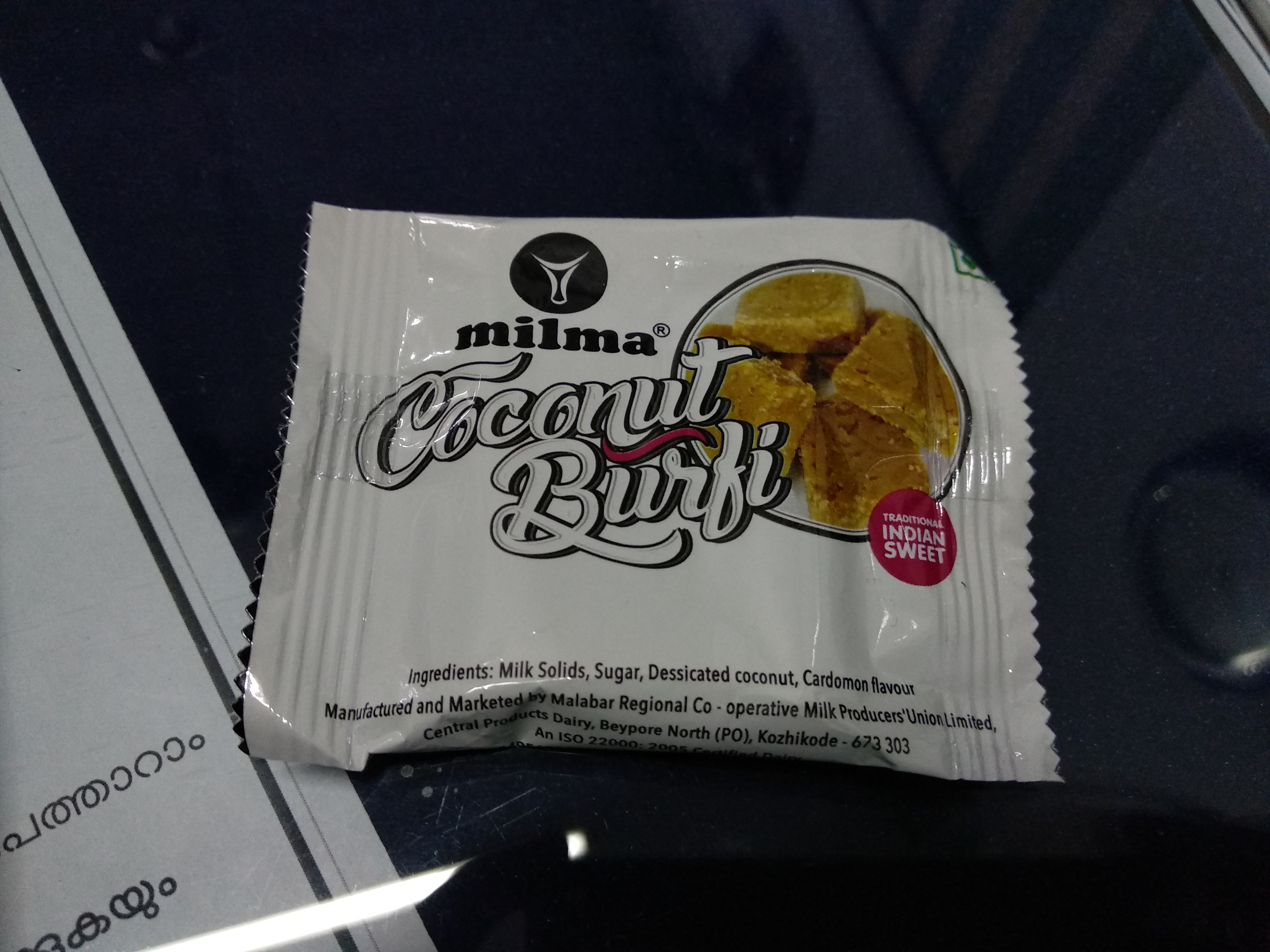
Milma Coconut Burfi

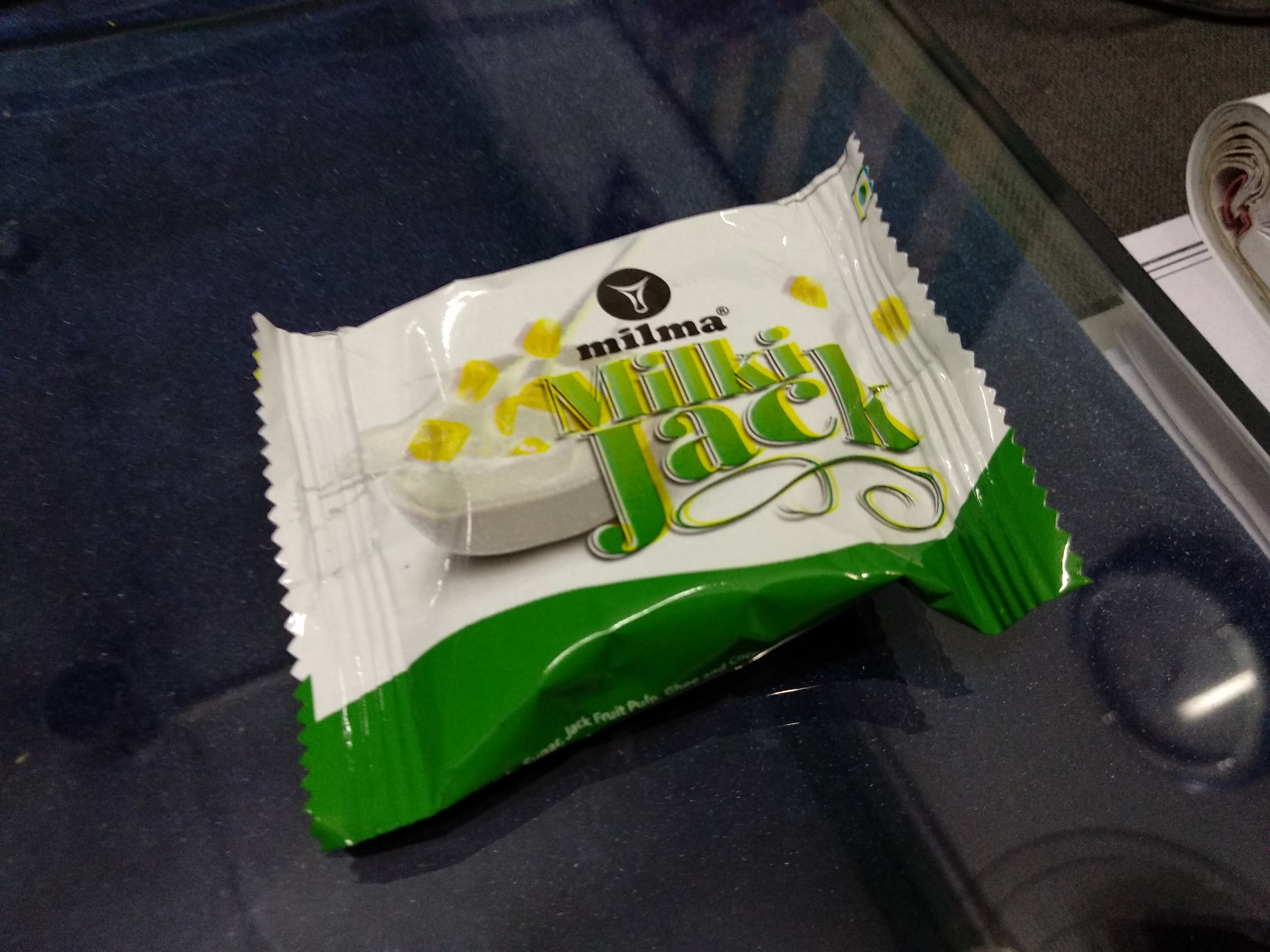
Milma Milki Jack – Jackfruit Peda

The Organisation has a three-tier structure with the primary milk Cooperative societies at the village level, Regional Milk Producers' Unions at the middle level and an apex body at the State level, which is the Kerala Cooperative Milk Marketing Federation Ltd. There are three Regional Cooperative Milk Producers' Unions operating at present. The revenue districts of Thiruvananthapuram, Kollam, Alappuzha, and Pathanamthitta come under the jurisdiction of the Thiruvananthapuram Regional Cooperative Milk Producers' Union (TRCMPU), the districts of Ernakulam, Thrissur, Kottayam and Idukki under the Ernakulam Regional Cooperative Milk Producers' Union (ERCMPU) and the six northern districts of Palakkad, Kannur, Malappuram, Kozhikkode, Wayanad and Kasaragod under the Malabar Regional Cooperative Milk Producers Union (MRCMPU). The three-tier structure ensures that the farmer members are directly responsible for policy-level decisions for the marketing of their produce.

The farmer memberships, which stood at 45,000 during the takeover of dairies from the erstwhile Kerala Livestock Development & Milk Marketing Board in 1983, has grown to over 9.0 lakhs (approximately 3 Lakhs pouring members) through 3,600 milk Cooperatives by the end of 2017–18. Similarly, milk procurement has shown phenomenal growth from 52,000 litres per day in 1983 to over 12,25,000 litres per day in 2017–18.

Keeping pace with the development of milk procurement and sale, Milma has concentrated on infrastructural development with financial assistance from the National Dairy Development Board, Swiss Development Cooperation and other agencies. Currently, there are 13 milk processing plants with a combined processing capacity of 12.50 lakh litres per day, with further expansion envisaged and 8 Milk Chilling Plants scattered across the State. A Milk Powder Plant has a capacity for producing 10 MT of milk powder per day, and two cattle feed plants, one at Pattanakkad (300 MTPD) and the other at Malampuzha (300 MTPD). The Pellet cattle feed manufactured in these plants is well accepted by the Dairy farmers and in the open market. K S Mani is the Chairman of Kerala Cooperative Milk Marketing Federation (MILMA).

== Ksheera Santhwanam Insurance Scheme ==
Ksheera Santhavanam is a comprehensive insurance scheme implemented by the State Dairy Development Department for the dairy farmers and Dairy Union employees of the state of Kerala. The insurance will cover cattle, dairy farmers, family members, and dairy workers. The scheme is implemented in collaboration with the United India Insurance Company and the Life Insurance Corporation of India. Cow security, health security, accident insurance, and life insurance policies will be available under this scheme. Farmers of Dairy Unions can become members of the scheme by approaching the Dairy Union Secretary and submitting an application form. As the State Dairy Development Department provides a certain amount (up to 50%) as a premium subsidy, the dairy farmer must pay only a moderate amount.

An enrollment form attested by Gram Panchayat Veterinary Surgeon should be submitted for insuring cattle. Under the Gau Raksha policy, one cow will get insurance coverage of ₹50,000 to ₹70,000.

Farmers up to 80 years of age will get insurance coverage. There is no age limit for farmers' parents to avail of the benefit.

Under the scheme, one gets a medical benefit of up to one lakh rupees. Those who subscribe to the accident security policy will get insurance up to ₹7 lakh. The policy term is one year.

== See also ==
- Sudha – Bihar State Milk Co-operative Federation
- Nandini – Karnataka Milk Federation
- Aavin – Tamil Nadu Dairy Development Corporation Limited
- omfed – Odisha State Cooperative Milk Producers' Federation
- Amul – Gujarat Cooperative Milk Marketing Federation Ltd.
