= Manohar Lal Sharma =

Indian lawyer

Manohar Lal Sharma (c. 1956 — December 19, 2025) was an Indian Supreme Court advocate. He defended the accused in the 2012 Delhi "Nirbhaya" gang rape case. He was known for filing many public interest litigations in India. He has been characterized as a "serial petitioner," with many of his cases dismissed at preliminary stages. He died in December 2025 of kidney disease, aged 69.

== Career ==
Starting with a public interest litigation in 1991 against provisions of the Places of Worship Act, 1991, Sharma had litigated a number of issues in Indian courts that have attracted media attention.

He had filed the first petition before the Supreme Court about the Indian coal allocation scam. He was also the first to challenge the government's decision to abrogate Article 370 of Indian Constitution.

In 2007, as an independent advocate, Sharma filed a public interest litigation petition in the Supreme Court in the case of Sant Muktabai Sahakari Sakhar Karkhana. That same year, he filed a PIL against the nomination of Pratibha Patil as president on grounds of financial impropriety, which was dismissed at the admissions stage. He also challenged the Securities and Exchange Board of India (SEBI) margin rule application and filed a case seeking a judicial committee to probe allegations against former Chief Justice of India Y. K. Sabharwal in the Delhi sealing cases; both were dismissed at admission.

In 2008, he filed a PIL against the India–United States Civil Nuclear Agreement, which was dismissed. Between 2010 and 2012, he filed multiple cases against the Union of India and state governments, with many dismissed due to lack of substantial prayer and improper drafting.

Sharma defended the accused in the 2012 Delhi gang rape case. The Delhi gang rape case gained him notoriety in international news media. He was, at the time, the only lawyer prepared to defend the rape accused in the face of a boycott call by various advocate associations. He was featured in the documentary India's Daughter in defense of the Nirbhaya case.

Other dismissed petitions include a December 2015 case claiming the CIA was funding the Aam Aadmi Party, a 2011 petition seeking regulation of NGO finances, and a 2017 challenge to the Indus Waters Treaty. In 2021, he filed a petition seeking a probe into the Pegasus spyware issue.

== Controversy ==
In defence of the accused in the 2012 Delhi gang rape and murder case, Sharma blamed the victim, a young female physical therapy student, for using public transportation. He said, "Until today I have not seen a single incident or example of rape with a respected lady. Even an underworld don would not like to touch a girl with respect." Sharma claimed the gang rape was "planned by her boyfriend to gain political mileage."

In May 2015, Supreme Court issued a notice to Sharma to show cause for "why he should not be debarred from filing and/or canvassing any Public Interest Litigation on account of the irresponsible and scandalous allegations levelled by him" in his pleadings challenging the NJAC. In response, Sharma tendered an unconditional apology to the Court.

=== Contempt notice over false averments ===
On 18 November 2022, Supreme Court of India issued contempt notice to Sharma for allegedly attributing motives to Madhya Pradesh High Court Chief Justice Ravi Malimath in their petition challenging the High Court verdict.
