= Horticultural Producers' Cooperative Marketing and Processing Society =

Indian farmers' society

- Abbreviation: HOPCOMS
- Formation: 1965
- Founder: M. H. Mari Gowda
- Founded at: Bengaluru
- Type: Society
- Legal status: Functional
- Purpose: Direct marketing
- Headquarters: Lalbagh, Bengaluru
- Location: Bengaluru
- Coordinates: 12.95°N 77.59°E
- Region served: Karnataka
- Products: Farm produces
- Members: 12,680 (2014)
- Managing Director: Umesh Mirji
- Administrator: P. R. Palangappa
- Chairperson: H. K. Nagaveni
- Paid up capital: ₹26.59 million
- Board of directors: 15
- Parent organization: Department of Horticulture
- Revenue: ₹958.50 million (2014)
- Website: hopcoms.karnataka.gov.in
- Formerly called: Bangalore Grape Growers’ Marketing and Processing Co-operative Society

Horticultural Producers' Cooperative Marketing and Processing Society, popularly known by its acronym, HOPCOMS, is a farmers' society founded in 1965 for the direct marketing of farm produces. The society is headquartered in Lalbagh, Bengaluru, in the south Indian state of Karnataka and its activities are spread in the districts of Bangalore Urban, Bangalore Rural, Kolar, Ramanagar, Mandya, Mysuru and Chikkaballapura.

== Overview ==
The origin of HOPCOMS was in 1959 when Mari Gowda, the then director of the department of horticulture, founded the Bangalore Grape Growers’ Marketing and Processing Co-operative Society for promoting grape farming by providing farming know how to the grape farmers and arranging a marketing set up for their products. The society had its operations in Bangalore, Kolar, Mysore, Tumkur, Mandya and Mangalore districts. A few years later, the society started dealing in other farm produces and re-branded itself as the Horticultural Producers’ Co-operative Marketing and Processing Society in 1965, registering itself as a cooperative society. It comes under the jurisdiction of the department of horticulture, Government of Karnataka.

The main activity of the society is the maintenance of a marketing system by which the farmers are ensured of a good price for their produces and the consumers are provided with quality goods at affordable prices. The society has eliminated the middle men and acts as the only link between the farmers and the consumers. As of March 2014, the society has a paid up capital of ₹26.59 million composed of Class A (farmers), Class B (NGOs, institutions) and Class C (government) shares and a member strength of 12,680 farmers. The organization is managed by a board of directors, reporting to the department of horticulture of the Government of Karnataka. Eleven of the 15 member board are elected from the farmers while the state government has three appointed officers and a nominee on the board. It employs 650 permanent staff and 790 temporary workers. The President is elected from the Class A members while the Managing Director is an appointee of the state government.

== Objectives ==
- Dissemination of knowledge by way of training, technical advice and printed literature.
- Supply of farm equipment, consumables such as manure and grafts.
- Arranging storage facilities including cold storage.
- Facilitating marketing of the produces through own marketing set up.
- Direct supply of fruits and vegetables to factories, hospitals, hostels, clubs, social functions and processing industries.

== Activities ==
The activities of HOPCOMS are threefold; procurement, storage and distribution. It has opened four procurement centres at Sarjapura, Channapatna, Hosakote and Kanakapura where facilities have been arranged for acceptance, weighment and grading of produces. The payment to the farmers are distributed immediately on acceptance of goods. The goods are then transferred to central godown, processing units or retail outlets as per requirement. The society runs 276 retail outlets of which 238 retail outlets in the urban and rural areas of Bengaluru and 19 outlets in Kolar district.

HOPCOMS has fruit processing units which processes Grape, Mango and Orange juices for the retail market. It also has a distribution system for supplying fruits and vegetables to government hospitals such as Victoria Hospital, Leprosorium Hospital, Bowring & Lady Curzon Hospitals, NIMHANS and Kidwai Memorial Institute of Oncology, factories such as Indian Telephone Industries and Hindustan Machine Tools, hostels and clubs and also undertakes supply of produces for social and marriage functions. The total quantity of goods handled by HOPCOMS in a day is around 100 tonnes. It also supplies equipment, manure and consumables to the farmers at reduced rates and has plans to open a walk-in supermarket and 100 modern outlets with funding from the Karnataka Horticultural Federation. The society organizes periodic fruit and vegetable festivals in various places in Karnataka where special stalls are set up for direct selling of produces. HOPCOMs is also associated with other organizations dealing in fruits and vegetables such as National Agricultural Cooperative Marketing Federation of India (NAFED), Himachal Pradesh Horticultural Produce Marketing and Processing Corporation (HPMC), GROWREP, VEFCO and National Dairy Development Board (NDDB).

The society avails financial assistance from government and financial institutions for its developmental activities. It has collected grants from Zilla Parishads and the National Horticultural Board and a loan of ₹44.80 million from the National Cooperative Development Corporation of which ₹21.50 million has been paid back. However, it has been reported that the market presence of HOPCOMS has diminished over the years. The advent of retail outlet chains and reluctance of farmers to supply goods to the society has reportedly reduced the business volume from 34,000 tonnes of fruits and vegetables in 1997–98 to 20,726 tonnes during 2013–14.

== See also ==
- National Agricultural Cooperative Marketing Federation of India
- National Cooperative Development Corporation
