= Ashish Kumar Bhutani =

Indian civil servant

Personal details
- Born: September 21, 1967 (age 58)
- Education: MBBS
- Occupation: Civil servant

Ashish Kumar Bhutani (born 21 September 1967) is an Indian Administrative Service (IAS) officer of the 1992 Assam-Meghalaya cadre. He is currently serving as the Secretary of the Ministry of Co-operation, Government of India.

== Early life and education ==
Bhutani was born on 21 September 1967. He holds a degree in Medicine MBBS from King George's Medical University, Lucknow.

== Career ==
Bhutani is currently serving as Secretary of the Ministry of Co-operation, Government of India. Before this appointment, he was the CEO of the Pradhan Mantri Fasal Bima Yojana (PMFBY), with the rank of Additional Secretary in the Ministry of Agriculture and Farmers' Welfare, Government of India.

He has also served in the Government of Assam as Additional Chief Secretary, in charge of the Departments of Agriculture and Transformation & Development and chairman of State Level Recruitment Commission for all Grade-III posts.
