= Indian Potash Limited =

Indian fertiliser company

- Type: Subsidiary of Indian Farmers Fertiliser Cooperative
- Founded: 17 June 1955
- Headquarters: Floor 1, Seethakathi Business Centre, Anna Salai, Chennai, India
- Area served: India
- Key people: Dr. P. S. Gahlaut, Managing Director and Director; D. John Thankam, President
- Products: Fertilisers
- Revenue: ₹166.5 billion (US$1.7 billion) (2015–16)
- Net income: ₹1.62 billion (US$17 million) (2010–11)
- Owner: Indian Farmers Fertiliser Cooperative (34%)
- Website: www.indianpotash.org

Indian Potash Limited, also known as IPL, is a fertiliser company based in India. It was incorporated under Indian Companies Act with the objective of import-handling, promotion and marketing of Potash in India. It imports, handles, promotes, and markets potash fertilisers in India. It sells fertilisers such as Muriate of Potash, Triple Super Phosphate, Monoammonium Phosphate, and Sulfate of Potash. Dr. PS Gahlaut serves as both the managing director and Director of Indian Potash Limited, a prominent fertilizer company in India. The company was formerly known as Indian Potash Supply Agency and changed its name to Indian Potash Limited in 1970. The company was founded in 1955 and is headquartered in Chennai, India. It is India's largest potash firm.

== History ==
Indian Potash Limited was founded in 1955 as Indian Potash Supply Agency. After independence of India from British rule in 1947, there were a number of importers of Muriate of Potash (MOP) mainly for application on tea/coffee gardens and other plantation crops. In 1955 these importers formed a consortium for joint working and named it as Indian Potash Supply Agency (IPSA) for import and distribution of MOP across India. The main objective of IPSA was to create awareness among the farmers on the use of Potash.

In 1970, IPSA was converted into Indian Potash Limited (IPL) and its equity base was expanded with Cooperative Sector, Fertiliser Companies in both Private and Public Sectors with major shares with Cooperative Sector.

== Company ==
Currently, Co-operative sector holds more than 70% of shares in the company and the largest shareholder is Indian Farmers Fertiliser Cooperative with 33.99% holding. Other major shareholders are Gujarat, Andhra and Tamil Nadu State Co-Op Marketing Federation Cooperatives. Madras Fertilisers Limited is the largest Public sector shareholder in the company while Gujarat State Fertilisers and Chemical Limited is the largest shareholder from the Private sector.

IPL is the largest importer of fertiliser in the country and second largest buyer of fertilisers in international market. IPL imports fertilisers through all the Indian ports and it is the only company in India which handles fertilisers throughout the year at all ports. The company is also active in production and marketing of Cattle Feed, dairy products, sugar and trading of precious metals (gold and silver).

== Plants ==
In order to strengthen the relationship with farmers, the company has started production and marketing of Cattle Feed all over the country. They commenced the production and distribution of feeds from two plants one at Sikandrabad, Uttar Pradesh and another at Renigunta, Andhra Pradesh to meet the requirement of states in northern and southern India.

IPL has footprint in Dairy industry as well. They have established one dairy plant in Kundli (Sonepat district), Haryana and another dairy plant at Sikandrabad in Uttar Pradesh. They work in close coordination with Mother Dairy to develop their dairy division.

They have acquired five Sugar Units in Uttar Pradesh during the financial year 2010–2011. The company is also working on two joint venture products namely Green Field Port Facility on Gujarat coast and an Integrated Sugar Complex with Co-generation and Distillery in Bihar.

== Production and sales ==
The total volume sales of all products during the year 2015–16 stood at 7.8 million tonnes. MOP or Muriate of Potash is the flagship product of the company and was able to achieve sales of 2.78 million tonnes in the year 2015–16.

== Financial performance ==
The total revenue of the company during the year 2015–16 was at INR 16,650.23 crores. The Company earned a Pre-tax Profit of INR 247.47 crores and Net Profit of INR 161.91 crores.

== See also ==
- List of companies of India
