= Aavin scam =

2014 Tamil Nadu milk adulteration scam linked to AIADMK members

The Aavin milk scam involved continuous diversion of supply vans from various districts midway on the route to Chennai and diluting with water. Aavin is the co-operative milk society of the state government of Tamil Nadu, India. The scam was found out on 19 August 2014 when police investigated the van from Narayanapuram village that was carrying empty milk cans that left Tiruvannamalai chilling centre bound to Chennai. Following the news, the state minister for milk was stripped of his post, nine Aavin officials were suspended and the chief suspect, Vaidyanathan, was arrested. The initial estimate of the losses have been valued at one per cent of the total ten lakh litres, amounting to ₹23 lakhs a day.

== Background ==
The Dairy Development Department was established in Tamil Nadu in 1958 and the administrative and statutory control of all the milk co-operative societies in the state came under its jurisdiction. The Co-operative Milk Producers' Federation Limited was registered on 1 February 1981 and the commercial activities like procurement, processing, chilling, packing and sale of milk were transferred from the department to the Federation, which was called Aavin. The dairy units in the state operate in a three-tier model at state, district and village levels. Aavin was one of the few original agencies using vendor machines in India. Booths were run in the capital city where flavoured milk, milk sweets, ghee, butter and plain milk are sold. Each year, the organization introduced new products. The agency provided high-quality milk at reasonably low cost in the state.

== Scam ==
Arrest of the accused

However after inquiry and investigation carried out by the high court of Madras, it was concurred that there was no iota of proof against the accused Mr. N. Vaidhyanathan and the case was discharged.The High Court of Madras discharged the case under the pretext "It would a waste of court time to further investigate this case" as per order issued by the court.

— "Aavin scam is a lie"-High court official, Court Order, 2018

Aavin procures milk from various district milk unions in the state through delivery tankers. Vaidyanathan, the person involved in leasing the milk trucks, is believed to have diverted the trucks to Govindapuram, a village in the outskirts of Tindivanam. The Vellimedupettai police on complaints from local residents on 19 August 2014 raided the vehicles and found that milk vans carrying supplies to Aavin in Chennai were diverted midway and adulterated with water. The police arrested eight people involved, but found that they were involved in the business for the past six months. Initial investigations revealed that the modus operandi was diversion of hundreds of milk tankers (each having 12,000 litres of milk) near a preset post in Tindivanam, where 2,000 litres of milk were taken off from the sealed containers and refilled with water. All the tankers were owned by AIADMK party person N. Vaidyanathan. The stolen milk was siphoned off to private milk agencies, which sold or produced dairy products. The investigation also revealed that the operation was carried out for more than ten years. The kingpin of the operation, Vaidyanathan, started as a concessionaire of Aavin milk in 1987 and subsequently emerged as an owner of hundreds of trucks that supply milk to Aavin. He is alleged to have the backing of several officials who could change policies for his benefit. The initial estimate of the losses one per cent of the total ten lakh litres, amounting to ₹ 23 lakhs a day. The investigating agencies then traced the owner of the truck to be Vaidyanathan and arrested him in Chennai.However, after inquiry and investigation carried out by the high court of Madras, it was concurred that there was no iota of proof against the accused Mr. N. Vaidhyanathan and the case was discharged. Court discharged the case under the pretext "It would a waste of court time to further investigate this case" as per order issued by the court.

== Enquiry ==
The case was transferred to the CB-CID division of the Tamil Nadu state police and twenty-one teams including four in Chennai were set up to conduct raids in various divisions of the Union. The CB-CID summoned the General Managers of all the District Co-operative Milk Unions to enquire about the adulteration.

== Aftermath ==
The Vellore milk union stopped utilizing the trucks and Aavin started procuring from Vellore using its own vehicles for procurement. Farmer associations also demanded a CBI probe as the suspects were operating in neighbouring states like Andhra Pradesh. They also called for streamlining the operation of the organization as it was deviating from the guidelines specified by the National Dairy Development Board. The state minister for dairy development, Moorthy, was stripped of his post in connection with the scam on allegations that the prime accused, Vaidyanathan, was closely associated with him.

In October 2016, Mr. Vaidyanathan has provided a detailed explanation on the current standing of the Aavin issue . It can be noticed that the allegations of swindling lakhs of money is completely false as the charge sheet issued by the Police of Tamil Nadu on the transport companies owned by Vaidhyanathan have posted a total worth of ₹ 20,400 only for the losses incurred. Also, he mentions that the allegation has been falsely implicated on him since he has not paid his fleet drivers their due salary. Furthermore, the allegation on him also states that due to the improper payment of salary committed by him has forced the drivers to steal the milk from his tankers during transit. Currently, the inquiry is still in progress. He also has stated that he has been cornered by the Aavin officials as he has collected enough information to prove against them the adulteration and the scam involved in aavin packet films. It can also be noted that in 2014, he has filed a detailed affidavit in the Madras High Court Madurai branch detailing the multi crore sachet tender. This could be the potential reason for enraging the officials to have gone out of the way in laying a theft case where neither his vehicles nor his officials were involved.
