= Asociación Empresarial ASLE =

Spanish not-for-profit association

The Asociación Empresarial ASLE (ASLE) is a not for profit association that promotes and supports employee-owned companies in the Basque Country (Euskadi), particularly using the sociedad laboral model. The name ASLE derives from 'Agrupación de Sociedades Laborales De Euskadi'.

== Txemi Cantera International Social Economy Prize ==
ASLE awards the Txemi Cantera International Social Economy Prize annually to an individual or organisation that has made a significant contribution to upholding the values that define employee-owned companies, such as participation, democracy and solidarity. The prize has been awarded since 1991 in memory of Jose Miguel Cantera Sojo, nicknamed Txemi, an economist and adviser to ASLE. Each winner receives a sculpture created by Agustin Ibarrola.

Prize winners include:

- 1991: CICOPA
- 1992: ALFONSO GORROÑOGOITIA
- 1993: GUIVAT HAVIVA
- 1994: UNIVERSIDAD DE DEUSTO
- 1995: UNITED AIRLINES
- 1996: JOSE Mª ORMAETXEA / JESUS LARRAÑAGA
- 1997: UTAN GRÄNSER
- 1998: JOSE ESPRIU
- 1999: FUNDACION SOCIAL DE BOGOTÁ
- 2000: IRIZAR, S.COOP.
- 2001: FUNDACION DEL EMPRESARIADO CHIHUAHUENSE
- 2002: ONCE
- 2003: FONDO ECUATORIANO POPULORUM PROGRESSIO
- 2004: BEROHI, S.COOP.
- 2005: FORMULA SERVIZI
- 2006: AUTOESCUELA LAGUNAK, S.A.L.
- 2007: Actuar Famiempresa.
- 2008: Rafael Calvo Ortega.
- 2009: Corey Rosen.
- 2010: Lantegi Batuak and Gureak.
- 2011: Tullis Russell.
- 2012: José Luis Monzón and Heroslam, S.A.L.
- 2013: Golder Associates.
- 2014: Orona (part of the Mondragon Corporation).
- 2015: Antonio Polo de Salinas de Guaranda.
- 2016: FMD Carbide, S.A.L. and Gráficas Zamudio Printek, S.A.L.
- 2017: Voestalpine.
- 2018: KL katealegaia S.L.L.
- 2019: SRC Holdings Corporation.
- 2020: Josetxo Hernández.
- 2021: Graeme Nuttall
- 2022: Juan Antonio Pedreño
- 2023: Red Comparte
- 2024: Sutargi SAL
