= Odisha State Cooperative Milk Producers' Federation =

Indian state government cooperative

- Type: State government cooperative
- Industry: Dairy
- Founded: 1985
- Defunct: Active
- Headquarters: D-2 Saheed Nagar, Bhubaneswar, Odisha, India
- Area served: Odisha
- Key people: Sri.Kishore Chandra Pradhani (Chairperson); Shri Vijay Amruta Kulange, IAS, Managing Director, OMFED
- Products: Milk & Milk Products, Horticulture Products, Kandhamal Organic Products, Cattle Feed
- Owner: Ministry of Co-operation, Government of Odisha
- Website: www.omfed.com

The Odisha State Cooperative Milk Producers Federation also known as OMFED is a state government cooperative under the ownership of Ministry of Co-operation, Government of Odisha. It is situated at Bhubaneswar, the state capital of Odisha. It is an apex level Milk Producers' Federation in Odisha registered under Cooperative Society Act – 1962. Omfed was established based on AMUL pattern under operation flood-II of National Dairy Development Board (NDDB), for promoting, production, procurement, processing and marketing of milk & milk products initially in undivided districts of Puri, Cuttack, Dhenkanal, Keonjhar.

== Management ==
The Orissa state Cooperative Milk Producers' Federation Ltd. is controlled by a Board Of Directors which consists of Chairman of all affiliated Dist. Cooperative Milk Producers' Unions, three nominees of Government of Odisha, a nominee from the National Dairy Development Board and Managing Director of the Omfed (Who is the ex officio member). The Chairman of the BOD is elected amongst the members of the Board. The post of Chairman of the Federation is honorary. Shri Shri Vijay Amruta Kulange, IAS, Managing Director of OMFED.

== See also ==
- Bihar State Milk Co-operative Federation
- Karnataka Milk Federation
- Kerala Co-operative Milk Marketing Federation
