= Greatland Corporation =

American employee-owned software company

Greatland Corporation is an employee-owned company that supplies preprinted and blank wage and income reporting forms, primarily W-2 and 1099 forms, to small- and mid-sized businesses and tax professionals. Greatland also supplies business checks and specialty forms.

It has locations in Grand Rapids, Michigan, and Green Bay, Wisconsin.

== Subsidiary holdings ==
Greatland has three subsidiary organizations:

- FileTaxes.com is an online wage reporting system for small businesses for e-filing and mailing recipient copies of 1099-MISC, 1099-INT, 1099-DIV, 1099-R, 1099-S and W-2 forms, as well as filing and payments associated with 941 and 944 filing.
- Nelco Solutions; based in Green Bay, Wisconsin, was acquired by Greatland in 1998.
- Broker Forms, specializes in 1099 and W-2 reporting.
- ImageOne, a provider of presentation materials, custom-created presentation supplies, and W-2 and 1099 products, was acquired by Greatland in 2005. In June 2011, the company dissolved the ImageOne brand and folded it in under its existing Greatland brand.

== History ==
The firm was founded in 1974 by Robert Napieralski as Great Lakes Business Forms. The company was renamed Greatland Corporation in 1994.

It has 175 full and part-time employees divided between its sales and marketing offices at its Grand Rapids headquarters, and a printing, development and distribution operation in Green Bay. On September 26, 2006, Greatland became a 100% Employee-Owned (ESOP) company. Bob Nault is Greatland's CEO.

In October 2019, it was reported that Greatland has acquired JAT Software Inc., a provider of year-end reporting software, web applications and print services for companies, in an undisclosed deal.
