= Pratibha Mahila Sahakari Bank =

Indian cooperative bank

Pratibha Mahila Sahakari Bank (Pratibha Women Cooperative Bank) was a cooperative bank based in Jalgaon, Maharashtra, India. It was founded in 1973 by Pratibha Patil, who later became President of India, with the objective of empowering women.

Patil was a chairperson of the bank and also one of its directors, along with many of her relatives. She is one of 34 respondents in an ongoing case before the Aurangabad bench of the Bombay High Court regarding alleged mismanagement of the bank and misappropriation of funds.

The Reserve Bank of India (RBI) revoked the licence of the bank in 2003 after it was found out that the bank had engaged in various irregularities, including illegally waiving interest on loans given to many of Patil's family members.

== Inquiries and closure ==
The bank was declared "weak" by the RBI in 1995. An inquiry under the Maharashtra Cooperative Societies Act was ordered in July 2001 and reported that the bank had incurred losses of Rs 1.35 crore. This led to the resignations of the chairperson and eight directors. In April 2002, the Ministry of Finance asked the RBI to inquire into allegations of fund irregularities after receiving a number of complaints from the Cooperative Bank Employees Union and small depositors of the bank.

In February 2003, the RBI revoked the bank's licence due to concerns relating to serious financial irregularities. Among other points, the RBI noted that the bank's loan policy was suspect and that members of Patil's family, including brothers and nephews, had received favourable treatment regarding loans. Allegations listed by the RBI include a faulty loan policy of the bank and loan interest waivers given to Patil's relatives. It said that there was no-one on the board with knowledge of either management generally or banking in particular. The RBI determined that six of the ten largest loan defaulters were connected to Patil's family, that the paid-up share capital was negative and that its gross non-performing assets amounted to Rs 391.20 lakh.

== Post-closure events ==
Many depositors who had been attracted to the bank because of the involvement of Patil lost much of their savings, although the first Rs 1 lakh of their funds was protected by deposit insurance. At the time of Patil's nomination for the office of President of India, some of these people, who had still not received the balance of their deposits, alleged that the bank had become a "family fiefdom". Patil's spokespeople said that she had had no involvement in the granting of loans during her period as chairperson. They said that she had been chairperson for only slightly over a month and that the RBI report made no mention of her.

A High Court writ petition, filed by the banks' depositors and former employees in 2007 at the time of Patil's nomination for president, alleged that the bank collected Rs 4,556 from its employees' wages for victims of the Kargil War but failed to deposit the amount in the national fund. Other claims included that Patil's brother, Dilip, had misused the bank's telephone service and the bank ignored its remit of primarily loaning to women in order to provide loans for Patils's male relatives. Spokespeople from Patil's political party, the Indian National Congress, denied any involvement by her in these matters, saying that the bank operated satisfactorily until 1993. Some local INC members in Jalgaon, however, disagreed with the official line, as did the employees' union. They claimed that Patil had facilitated unsecured loans to her family and arranged waivers of interest despite the poor financial state of the bank after 1995. In total, they said, the familial loans that were defaulted amounted to nearly Rs. 225 lakh.

In 2011, Rajesh Chakrabarti, a faculty member at the Indian School of Business, wrote that the irregularities at Pratibha Mahila Sahakari Bank, along with some other notable problems among Urban Co-operative Banks (UCBs), "contributed significantly in eroding the brand value of UCBs" in the early 2000s.

== See also ==
- Women in cooperatives
