= Travancore Cochin Chemicals =

Indian chemical manufacturer

The Travancore Cochin Chemicals Ltd., abbreviated as TCC, is a public sector undertaking owned by the Government of Kerala, engaged in the manufacture and marketing of caustic soda (NaOH), chlorine, hydrochloric acid and sodium chlorate. It is situated in Udyogamandal industrial district of Kochi, India.

The TCC exports caustic soda to African countries. The company recorded a profit of ₹32 crore in 2018 up from ₹6 crore in 2017.

== History ==
The Travancore Cochin Chemicals Ltd. was founded in 1949 as a partnership between Mettur Chemical & Industrial Corporation Limited and FACT. It was later acquired by the Government of Travancore–Cochin. In 1960, it became under the Government of Kerala.
