= Tullis Russell =

UK paper manufacturing company

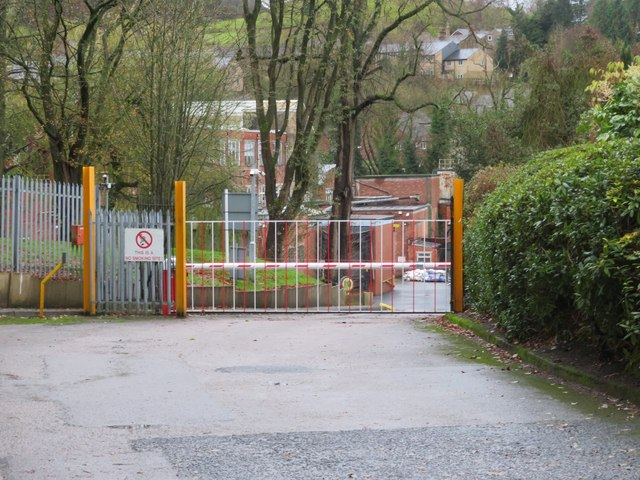
Entrance to Tullis Russell works, Bollington

Tullis Russell Group is an employee-owned business which specializes in coating and converting a range of paper and filmic products for use in various applications.

Tullis Russell has two major manufacturing sites, Bollington, Cheshire East and Ansan, South Korea.

== History ==
The company was founded in 1809 by Robert Tullis as R Tullis & Co. The company Coated Papers moved to Bollington in 1875. The company name changed to Tullis, Russell & Company Ltd on 21 May 1906. Sir David Russell was a former managing director. The company's brand of paper was called Ivorex, and Ivorindex for card. The company joined the Employers' Federation of Paper and Board Makers in 1947. Tullis Russell bought Coated Papers in 1989.

In 1986, the Russell family started a process whereby the ownership of the company would transfer to employees. In 199,6 a management buyout purchased 70 per cent of the shares, which are held today in an Employee Trust. The outstanding 30 per cent is held in the Russell Trust. In 2011 Tullis Russell received the Txemi Cantera International Social Economy Prize from ASLE for its commitment to the principles of the Social Economy.

In 199,9 Tullis Russell purchased the Kwang Duck Facility in Ansan, Korea, and is focused on the Image Transfer market. In 2015, Tullis Russell Labelstock division began trading.

== Structure ==
It is headquartered in Bollington in Cheshire, off the B5090, east of the A523, and on the western edge of the Peak District.

== Products ==
- Coated paper for postage stamps
- Image Transfer
- Label Stock
- Watermarked security paper (for cheques)

== See also ==
- Rapid Data Systems, of Hampshire, which produced plastic credit cards
