= Bihar State Milk Co-operative Federation =

Dairy cooperative in India

Sudha

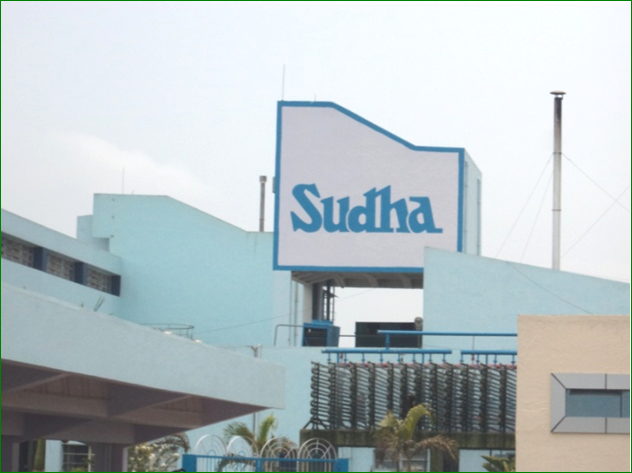
- A view of the dairy plant of Patna
- Type: State Government Cooperative
- Industry: Dairy
- Founded: 1983
- Headquarters: Patna, Bihar
- Products: Milk and its Products
- Owner: Ministry of Cooperation, Government of Bihar
- Website: sudha.coop

The Bihar State Milk Co-Operative Federation Ltd is a state government cooperative under the ownership of Ministry of Cooperation, Government of Bihar, India. It was established in 1983 as a state government cooperative of the Government of Bihar. It markets its products under the label "Sudha Dairy". The co-operative facilitates the procurement, processing, and marketing of dairy products. It provides education to the unions on efficient dairy processing, and assists them with animal care including artificial insemination, vaccination, and feeding.

== History ==
Logo Of Bihar State Cooperative Milk Federation (COMFED)

The Dairy co-operative was founded in 1983 to coordinate the work of various local milk unions. The government opened Nalanda dairy in 2013 which is the Largest Automation based Dairy Plant in Eastern India. The establishment of Sudha was a result of White Revolution. In January 2021, the organisation had decided to make two new dairy plants in Bhagalpur and Purnia districts operational by the next three-four months each with a capacity of 2 lakh litres per day. The setting of new plants would help enhance the income of the milk producers of the region. In year 2020,Bihar Government started a dairy plant of 5 lakh litres per day and an animal fodder plant of 300 MT per day at Bihian. For setting up dairy plants and animal fodder plants in the state, Government had released a sum of ₹53 crore to Comfed as first instalment out of ₹234 crore. In 2018, Bihar State Milk Co-operative Federation, known as Sudha, planned at consolidating its market in Guwahati before expanding its reach to other states of the Northeast. As per this policy, Sudha unveiled a range of dairy products comprising pouch milk in two variants, curd, paneer, lassi, chhach, peda, misti doi and cream in Guwahati.

== Organization ==
District-level Milk Producers' Cooperative Unions in Bihar
Milk Union	Headquarters	Districts Covered
Magadh Milk Union	Gaya	Gaya, Aurangabad, Jehanabad, Arwal, Nawada
Vaishali Patliputra Milk Union	Patna	Patna, Vaishali, Nalanda, Saran, Sheikhpura
DR Milk Union (DRMU)	Barauni	Begusarai, Khagaria, Lakhisarai, part of Patna
Tirhut Milk Union (TIMUL)	Muzaffarpur	Muzaffarpur, Sitamarhi, Sheohar, East Champaran (Motihari), Chakia, West Champaran, Siwan, Gopalganj
Mithila Milk Union	Samastipur	Samastipur, Darbhanga, Madhubani
Shahabad Milk Union	Ara	Bhojpur, Buxar, Kaimur, Rohtas
Vikramshila Milk Union (VIMUL)	Bhagalpur	Bhagalpur, Munger, Banka, Jamui
Kosi Milk Union	Purnia	Purnia, Katihar, Araria, Kishanganj, Supaul, Saharsa, Madhepura

The dairy development work continued and at present there are eight district level milk unions covering thirty Eight districts of Bihar. Comfed develops the districts first in terms of dairy development coupled with capacity development of milk producers to shoulder broader responsibilities and then hands over the entire operations to the representatives democratically elected by the milk producers. In 2020,Bihar Government had launched several new plants of the Bihar State Milk State Milk Cooperative Federation Limited (Comfed), worth over ₹221.73 crore.

The plants which were inaugurated are

1. ₹61.21 crore-dairy plant at Samastipur
2. ₹39.51 crore fodder plant at Bihia in Bhojpur district
3. ₹12.88 crore Milko-screen plant
4. 4.14 road milk tankers worth ₹3.13 crore.

Bihar Government under Chief Minister Nitish Kumar also laid foundation for

1. A new dairy plant of 2 lakh litres per day capacity at Gaya to be set up at a total cost of ₹26 crore
2. Dairy plant at Hajipur in Vaishali district to be set up at a cost of ₹52.59 crores.

In addition Bihar Government had also launched some new products of Sudha brand which included tetra-pack ‘lassi’, tetra-pack ‘chhachh’, tetra-pack ‘ilaichi’-flavoured milk, butter toffee flavoured milk and Haldi milk and some new varieties of Ice Cream.

Comfed is serving the consumers of not only in Bihar but also in Jharkhand and there are three dairies at Jamshedpur, Ranchi and Bokaro. These dairies are serving a good number of towns and cities of Jharkhand in Ranchi, East & West Singhbhoom, Hazaribagh, Gumla, Khunti, Palamu, Lohardaga, Bokaro, Dhanbad, Giridih etc. Sudha Milk and some products are available in Delhi/NCR region and Uttarakhand also apart from a number of towns and cities of U.P. and West Bengal.Comfed is now also serving in North-Eastern states like Assam, meghalaya, Nagaland etc.

The Farmer's Training Centre at Patna, Barauni and Begusarai provides training to the milk producers and society functionaries in various aspects of dairying, clean milk production, society operation, artificial insemination etc.

== Products and impact ==
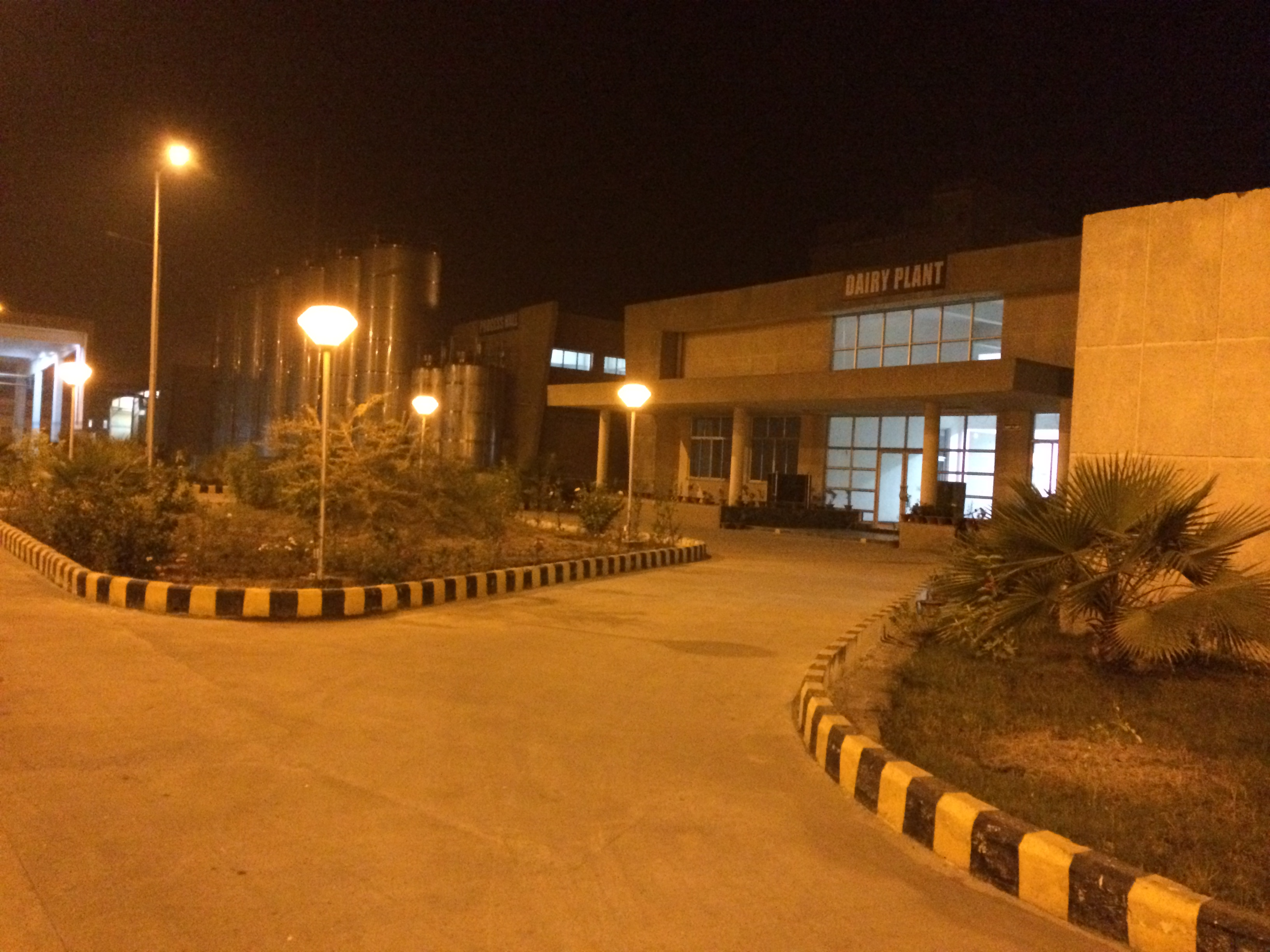
Nalanda dairy plant

The Milk Federation operates Nalanda dairy, a fully automated dairy plant at Bihar Sharif of Nalanda district that opened in 2013. Its products are marketed by parent organization Comfed, Patna. The Nalanda dairy has tetrapak and Elecster machines which are used for packaging of UHT processed milk, juice and flavored milk with a long shelf life. This is the first fully automated dairy plant of eastern India.

Sudha has witnessed growth in this portfolio, especially long life UHT products for urban populations. They undergo UHT treatment to remove all micro-organisms while retaining nutrition. Sudha sells around 4-5,00,000 liters of UHT milk and other value-added products per month. UHT products have enabled Sudha to position itself as the market leader in packaged milk segment without the need for maintaining cold supply chains.

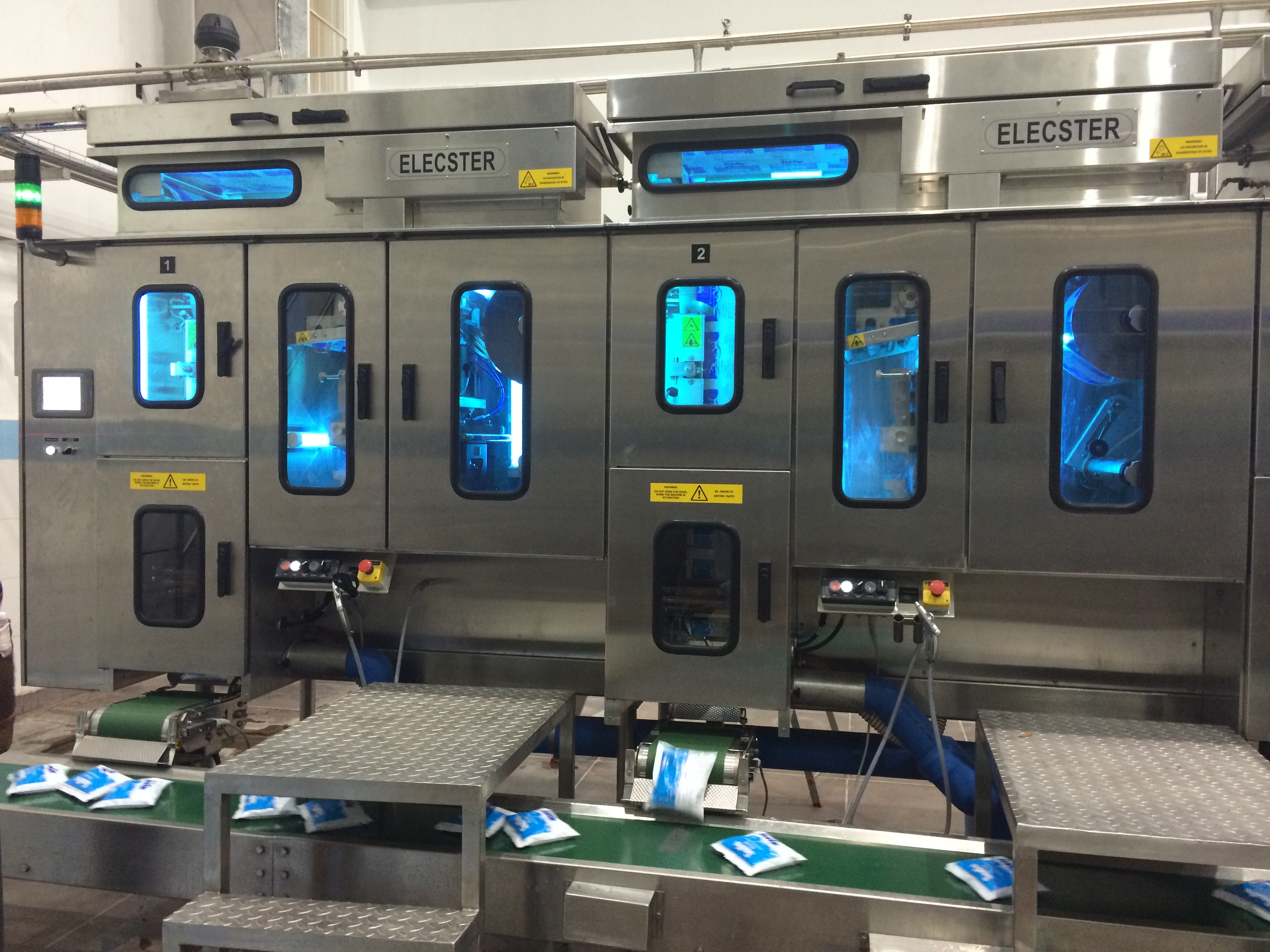
Elecster machine at Nalanda dairy

== See also ==
- Karnataka Milk Federation
- Odisha State Cooperative Milk Producers' Federation
