= Tidyman's =

Grocery store chain in Washington, U.S.

Tidyman's LLC
- Type: Supermarket
- Industry: Retail
- Founded: 1968
- Defunct: 2006
- Fate: Sale of remaining stores
- Headquarters: Spokane, Washington, U.S.
- Products: Bakery, dairy, deli, frozen foods, general grocery, meat, pharmacy, produce, seafood, snacks, liquor

Tidyman's was a chain of grocery stores founded and based in Spokane, Washington. At its peak, Tidyman's was operating over 20 stores in Washington, Idaho and Montana under the Tidyman's, Dissmore's IGA, Northwest Fresh Marketplace, and County Market banners. The grocery chain was forced to sell its remaining stores in 2006 after a highly publicized 1996 sexual discrimination scandal cost the company $6.2 million.

== History ==
=== Founding and merger with SuperValu ===
In 1968, Jim Tidyman and Bob Buchannan opened their first warehouse supermarket in Spokane, Washington. By December 1982, Tidyman's was operating eight stores in Washington, Idaho, and Montana. In 1986, Tidyman's was purchased by its employees.

During February 1992, following a November 1991 investigation, Tidyman's was fined $75,350 for employing 106 minors in violation of federal child labor laws. The United States Department of Labor said all nine Tidyman's stores had violated child labor laws in the two previous years. Officials had also said the number of minors involved was one of the largest ever found in the Pacific Northwest.

In May 1998, Tidyman's signed a letter of intent to merge with grocery wholesaler SuperValu. The merger allowed Tidyman's to retain majority ownership of its twelve Tidyman's stores in addition to eight County Market stores in Montana and the Dissmores IGA store in Pullman, Washington.

=== Sex discrimination scandal ===
During 1996, Connie Hemmings and Patty Lamphiear filed a lawsuit against Tidyman's after claiming the retailer was in violation of federal and state anti-discrimination laws. Tidyman's had violated these laws by failing to pay them wages and compensation that was equal to their fellow male employees, failing to promote them, and retaliating against them after they complained of the discrimination.

On April 13, 1999, the United States district court ordered the grocery company to pay $6.2 million (~$10.9 million in 2024) in what was one of the largest sex discrimination awards in Eastern Washington history. Only a month later, it was discovered that Tidyman's did not have employment liability insurance when lawsuit was filed and the future of the retailer was in jeopardy. Tidyman's had later purchased the insurance in 1997 but it was unable to help the retailer through the lawsuit.

On April 13, 2002, a federal appeals court reinstated the punitive damages that Hemmings and Lamphiear had won following the multimillion-dollar lawsuit. With the new ruling, Tidyman's now owed the two women $4.5 million plus $650,000 in attorney fees. This all came after U.S. District Court Judge Frem Nielsen had previously granted a Tidyman's post-trial motion and stripped away the jury's decision to award $2 million in punitive damages to the women. One year later, Tidyman's awarded Hemmings, Lamphiear, and their attorneys $6.3 million.

=== Store closures ===
Starting in 2003, the financially hurt retailer began shutting several stores. These closures began with two County Market stores in Billings and Miles City, Montana, in February 2003.

Starting in June 2004, Tidyman's closed six stores in Washington, Idaho, and Montana. These stores included five Tidyman's stores (one in Spokane, three in Idaho (Moscow, Lewiston, Coeur d'Alene), and Missoula, Montana), and one County Market store in Helena, Montana. That September, as an attempt to stay in business, Tidyman's announced plans to build three stores in the Spokane-Coeur d'Alene area and remodel six or seven stores. The company also intended to begin aggressively paying off its debt.

The six stores closed were initially planned to be the last stores Tidyman's would close. This changed when its Tidyman's store in Spokane Valley was shuttered on October 31, 2005. In January 2006, Tidyman's closed two more Country Market stores in Billings and Great Falls, Montana. Two more Tidyman's in Spokane and a County Market in Livingston, Montana, were closed on June 5, 2006.

On June 20, 2006, Tidyman's announced it would sell its remaining stores and cease operations. Tidyman's sold the Dissmore's IGA store in Pullman to McGregor's LLC and the County Market store in Sidney, Montana, to Buttes and Bluffs Markets.

== See also ==
- Rosauers Supermarkets
