= Sant Muktabai Sahakari Sakhar Karkhana =

Sugar factory in Jalgaon, India

Sant Muktabai Sahakari Sakhar Karkhana (SMSSK), known as Sant Muktabai Cooperative Sugar Factory, is a cooperative factory founded in 1988 by Pratibha Patil and others. The factory is situated at Muktainagar in Jalgaon district in Maharashtra. It was inaugurated by Sonia Gandhi on 23 January 1999, and Patil remained chairperson until 1996.

== Loan defaulter ==
The sugar factory was given a loan by a consortium of four banks, three cooperatives and one nationalised—MSC, DCCB Jalgaon, DCCB Mumbai, and Dena Bank. The factory defaulted in repayment of the borrowed money. The mill owed about 730 million rupees to three banks—Maharashtra State Cooperative (MSC) Bank, Jalgaon District Central Cooperative Bank, and the Mumbai District Central Cooperative Bank.

The Mumbai Central District Cooperative Bank served many notices on the factory for recovering an outstanding loan of 177 million rupees.

The bank sealed the factory on 23 January 2007. This was the second occasion when the mill had been sealed. Earlier, it was sealed in January 2006 but was reopened after the board of directors headed by G. N. Patil—younger brother of Patil requested an opportunity to improve the performance of the mill.

== Sugar scam ==
In 2002 the chief commissioner of central excise and customs, Pune, issued notices on 24 sugar factories including Sant Muktabai Sahakari Sakhar Karkhana to recover 87 million rupees due on account of excise duty evasion. The sugar factories, mostly in Pune and Aurangabad regions, have been found guilty of selling export quota sugar in the domestic market at high prices. These sugar factories have not only availed excise duty exemption of 85 rupees per quintal, but also earned a big differential by selling the sugar in the local market.

The scam involved the diversion of export-oriented sugar into the domestic market. In 2001–02, these co-operatives had obtained an export licence for 228,000 tonnes of sugar, but in collusion with export agents, diverted the sugar to the domestic market. This led to the collapse of domestic sugar prices and caused major losses to sugarcane farmers besides excise evasion of nearly 800 million rupees. The Muktabai SSK sugar cooperative factory was one of the companies which figured out the scam.

== Public interest litigation ==
In 2007, Manohar Lal Sharma, an independent advocate, filed a public interest litigation petition in the Supreme Court alleging that Patil was an undischarged insolvent relating to the Sant Muktabai Sugar Factory and hence disqualified to remain in the office of the presidency.
