= Softstar Shoes =

American shoe manufacturer and retailer

- Company type: Private
- Industry: Handmade shoe manufacturer
- Founded: 1984 Laguna Beach, California
- Founder: Tim Oliver, Jeannie Oliver
- Headquarters: Philomath, Oregon, United States
- Area served: Worldwide
- Owner: Patricia Salcido
- Website: softstarshoes.com

Softstar Shoes is an American shoe manufacturer and retailer based in Philomath, Oregon. It is known for its minimalist or barefoot-style shoes and has been recognized as an early participant in the movement to encourage minimalist footwear.

== History ==
Softstar Shoes was founded in 1984 by husband and wife Tim and Jeannie Oliver. They founded the company after being unable to find minimalist shoes for their daughter and learned to sew their own from a local artisan. They began selling the shoes to their friends and neighbors and introduced the brand Softstar Shoes at the Sawdust Art Festival in 1986. Softstar Shoes relocated from Texas to Oregon in 1991. The company was purchased by current owners Patricia Salcido and Larkin Holavarri in 2005. Holavarri sold her interest in the company to Salcido in 2018, leaving Salcido as the sole owner of the company. In 2026, Salcido transitioned ownership of the company to an Employee Owned Trust (EOT) and Softstar became 100% employee owned.

== Shoe styles ==
Softstar Shoes manufactures minimalist or barefoot-style shoes, which attempt to promote natural foot function by allowing feet to move, stretch and flex as though they were barefoot. In 2009 the company launched their RunAmoc line of minimalist running shoes, which coincided with the release of Christopher McDougall's bestselling book Born to Run, which increased interest in barefoot running and minimalist shoes. Softstar also manufactures minimalist shoes for children, and a variety of styles of moccasins. Its shoe line includes minimalist athletic shoes, minimalist adult casual shoes and minimalist children's shoes. It is also the only manufacturer of children's shoes based in the United States, with all materials sourced from the United States.
