= Pratibha Patil =

President of India from 2007 to 2012

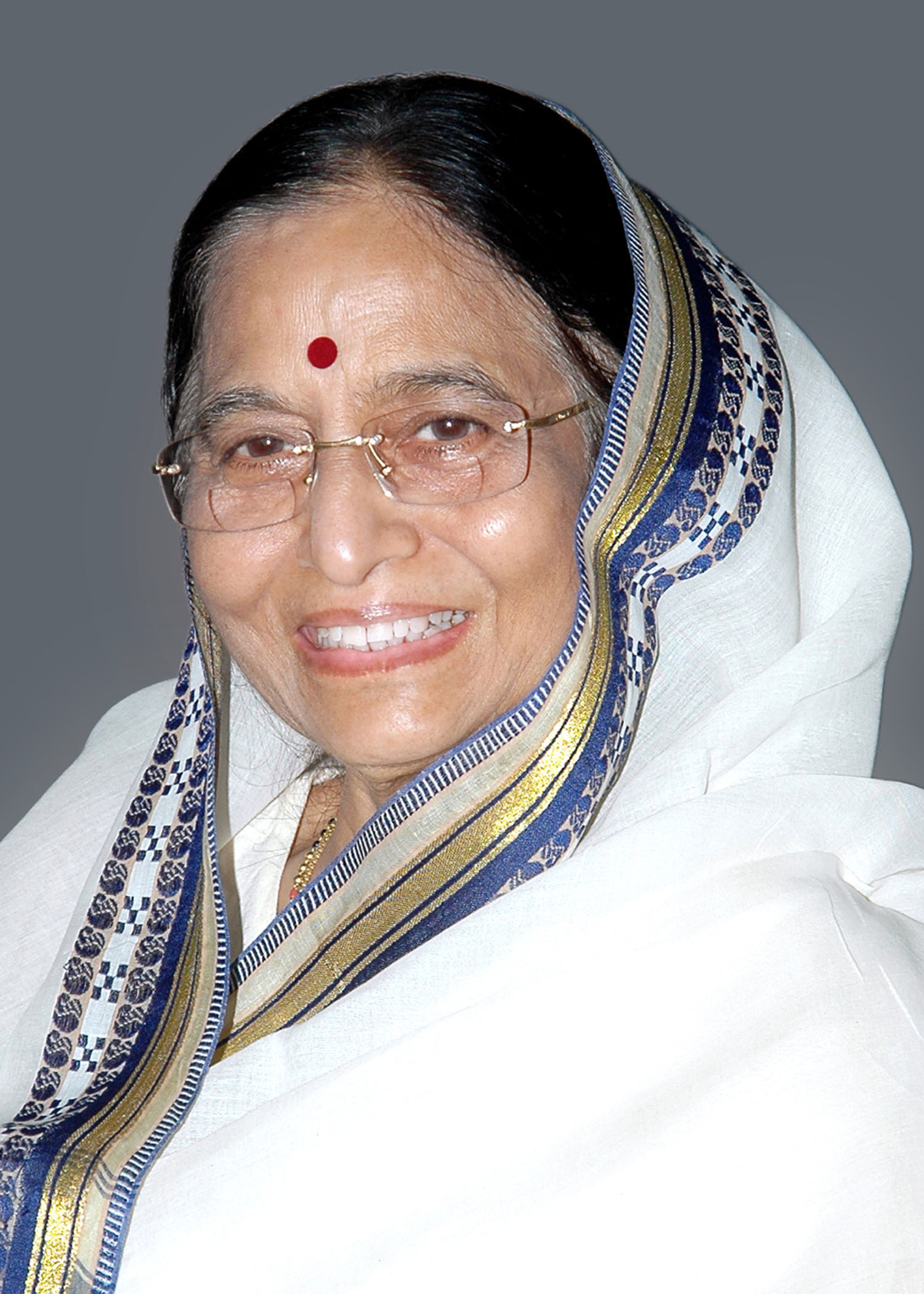
- Official portrait, 2007

President of India
- In office 25 July 2007 – 25 July 2012
- Prime Minister: Manmohan Singh
- Vice President: Mohammad Hamid Ansari
- Preceded by: A. P. J. Abdul Kalam
- Succeeded by: Pranab Mukherjee

Governor of Rajasthan
- In office 8 November 2004 – 23 June 2007
- Chief Minister: Vasundhara Raje
- Preceded by: Madan Lal Khurana
- Succeeded by: Akhlaqur Rahman Kidwai

Member of Parliament, Lok Sabha
- In office 21 June 1991 – 16 May 1996
- Preceded by: Sudam Deshmukh
- Succeeded by: Anantrao Gudhe
- Constituency: Amravati, Maharashtra

Deputy Chairperson of the Rajya Sabha
- In office 18 November 1986 – 5 November 1988
- Chairman: Ramaswamy Venkataraman (1986–1987); Shankar Dayal Sharma (1987–1988)
- Preceded by: M. M. Jacob
- Succeeded by: Najma Heptulla

Member of Parliament, Rajya Sabha
- In office 1985–1990
- Constituency: Maharashtra

Member of Maharashtra Legislative Assembly
- In office 1967–1985
- Preceded by: Hiralal Indal Kalyani
- Succeeded by: Haribhau Jaware
- Constituency: Edlabad
- In office 1962–1967
- Preceded by: Sadashiv Bhalerao
- Succeeded by: T. T. Salunkhe
- Constituency: Jalgaon

Personal details
- Born: Pratibha Narayanrao Patil; 19 December 1934 (age 91) Nadgaon, Bombay Presidency, British India (present–day Maharashtra, India)
- Party: Indian National Congress
- Spouse: Devisingh Ransingh Shekhawat (m. 1965; died 2023)
- Children: 2
- Education: University of Poona (BA, MA); Government Law College, Mumbai, University of Mumbai (LLB)
- Website: pratibhapatil.info

Pratibha Devisingh Patil (born 19 December 1934), also known as Pratibha Patil Shekhawat, is an Indian stateswoman and lawyer who served as the president of India from 2007 to 2012. She was the first woman to become the president of India. A member of the Indian National Congress, she also served as the Governor of Rajasthan from 2004 to 2007, and was a member of the Lok Sabha from 1991 to 1996.

== Early life ==
Patil was born on 19 December 1934 in the village of Nadgaon in Jalgaon district, Maharashtra, to a Marathi-speaking family. The ancestor of the family, Ramji Solanki, had come from Tonk in Rajasthan during the Maratha era and was given a jagir in Narnala, which his descendants then shifted to Nadgaon. She was the daughter of Narayanrao Patil, who was a lawyer. She was educated initially at R. R. Vidyalaya town and subsequently was awarded a master's degree in Political Science and Economics by Mooljee Jetha College, Jalgaon (then under Poona University), and then a Bachelor of Law degree by Government Law College, Bombay, affiliated to the University of Bombay (now University of Mumbai). Patil then began to practice law at the Jalgaon District Court, while also taking interest in social issues such as improving the conditions faced by Indian women.

Patil married Devisingh Ransingh Shekhawat on 7 July 1965. The couple has a daughter, Jyoti Rathore and a son, Raosaheb Shekhawat, who is also a politician.

== Political career ==
In 1962, at the age of 27, she was elected to the Maharashtra Legislative Assembly for the Jalgaon constituency. After that she won in the Muktainagar (formerly Edlabad) constituency on four consecutive occasions between 1967 and 1985, before becoming a Member of Parliament in the Rajya Sabha between 1985 and 1990. In the 1991 elections for the 10th Lok Sabha, she was elected as a Member of Parliament representing the Amravati constituency. A period of retirement from politics followed later in the decade.

Patil had held various Cabinet portfolios during her period in the Maharashtra Legislative Assembly and held official positions in both the Rajya Sabha and Lok Sabha. In addition, she had been the president of the Maharashtra Pradesh Congress Committee for a few years. Also, she held office as Director of the National Federation of Urban Co-operative Banks and Credit Societies and as a Member of the Governing Council of the National Co-operative Union of India.

On 8 November 2004 she was appointed the 17th Governor of Rajasthan, the first woman to hold that office.

== Presidential election ==
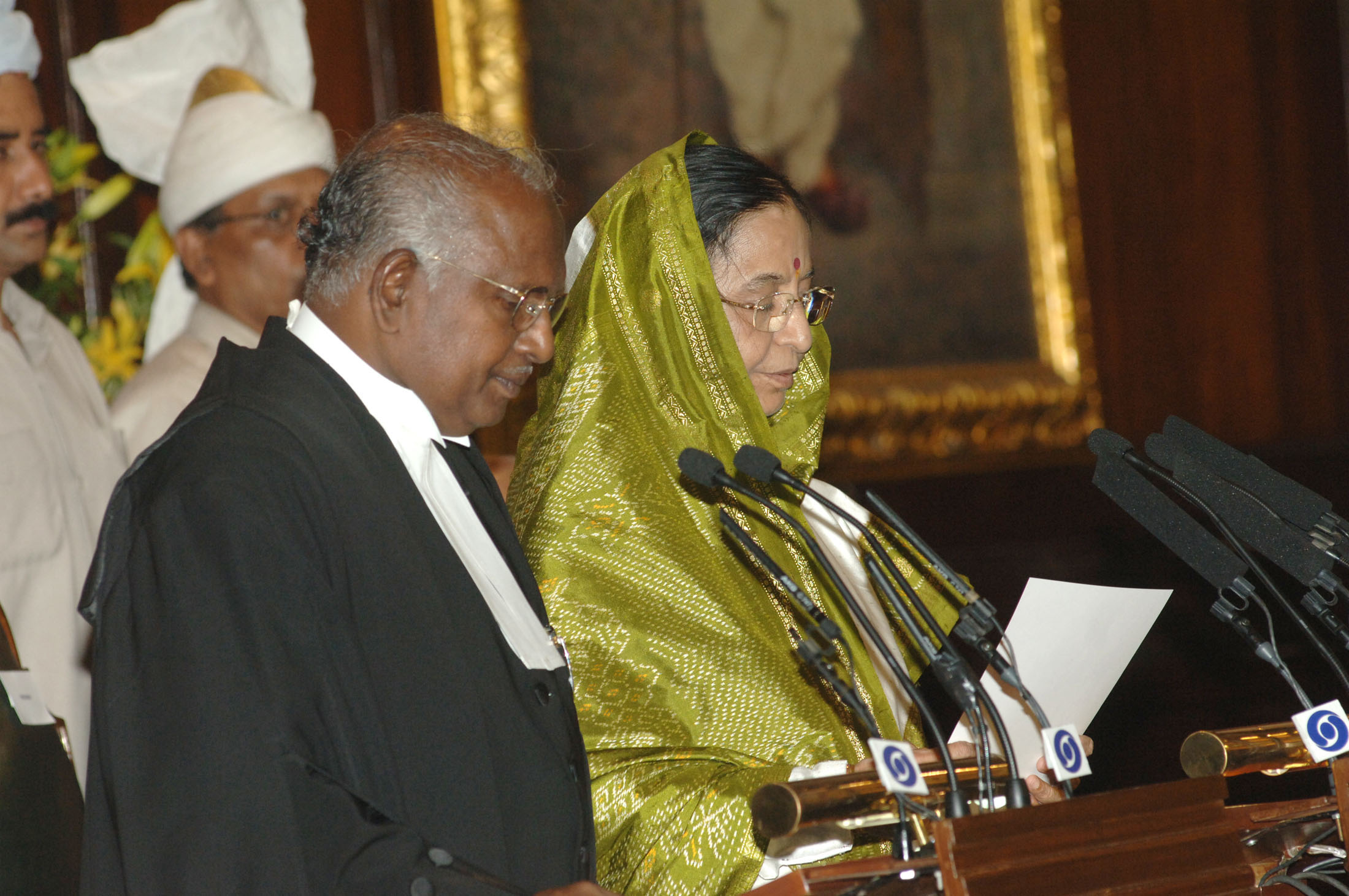
The Chief Justice of India K. G. Balakrishnan administering the oath of the office of the President of India to Pratibha Patil at a swearing-in ceremony in the central hall of Parliament, in New Delhi.

Patil was announced as the United Progressive Alliance (UPA) candidate on 14 June 2007. She emerged as a compromise candidate after the left-wing parties of the alliance would not agree to the nomination of former Home Minister Shivraj Patil or Karan Singh. Patil had been loyal to the INC and the Nehru–Gandhi family for decades and this was considered to be a significant factor in her selection by INC leader Sonia Gandhi, although Patil said that she had no intention of being a "rubber-stamp president".

In the same month that she was selected as a member of the UPA, Patil was accused of shielding her brother, G. N. Patil, in the 2005 Vishram Patil murder case. Vishram Patil had narrowly defeated G. N. Patil in an election to be the President of the District Congress Committee of Jalgaon and in September of that year had been murdered. Vishram Patil's widow eventually accused G. N. Patil of involvement in the crime and claimed that Pratibha Patil had influenced the criminal investigation and that the issue needed to be examined before presidential immunity became active. Her accusations were rejected by the courts in 2009 but in 2015 G. N. Patil was charged. No reference to the alleged involvement of Pratibha Patil was made at this time.

Due to the presidential role being largely a figurehead position, the selection of the candidate is often arranged by consensus among the various political parties and the candidate runs unopposed. Contrary to the normal pattern of events, Patil faced a challenge in the election. The BBC described the situation as "the latest casualty of the country's increasingly partisan politics and [it] highlights what is widely seen as an acute crisis of leadership". It "degenerated into unseemly mudslinging between the ruling party and the opposition". Her challenger was Bhairon Singh Shekhawat, the incumbent vice-president and a Bharatiya Janata Party (BJP) veteran. Shekhawat stood as an independent candidate and was supported by the National Democratic Alliance (NDA), a group led by the BJP, although the Shiv Sena party, which was a part of NDA, supported her because of her Marathi origin.

Those opposed to Patil becoming president claimed that she lacked charisma, experience, and ability. They also highlighted her time spent away from high-level politics and queried her belief in the supernatural, such as her claim to have received a message from Dada Lekhraj, a dead guru. Various specific issues were raised, such as a comment made by her in 1975 that those suffering from hereditary diseases should be sterilised. Another alleged that while a Member of Parliament for Amravati she diverted Rs 3.6 million from her MPLADS fund to a trust run by her husband. This was in violation of Government rules which barred MPs from providing funds to organisations run by their relatives. The parliamentary affairs minister denied any wrongdoing on Patil's part and noted that the funds are used under MPLADS, by the Comptroller and Auditor General of India.

Patil won the election held on 19 July 2007. She garnered nearly two-thirds of the votes and, on 25 July 2007, took oath as India's 12th President, the first woman to hold the position.

== President of India (2007–2012) ==
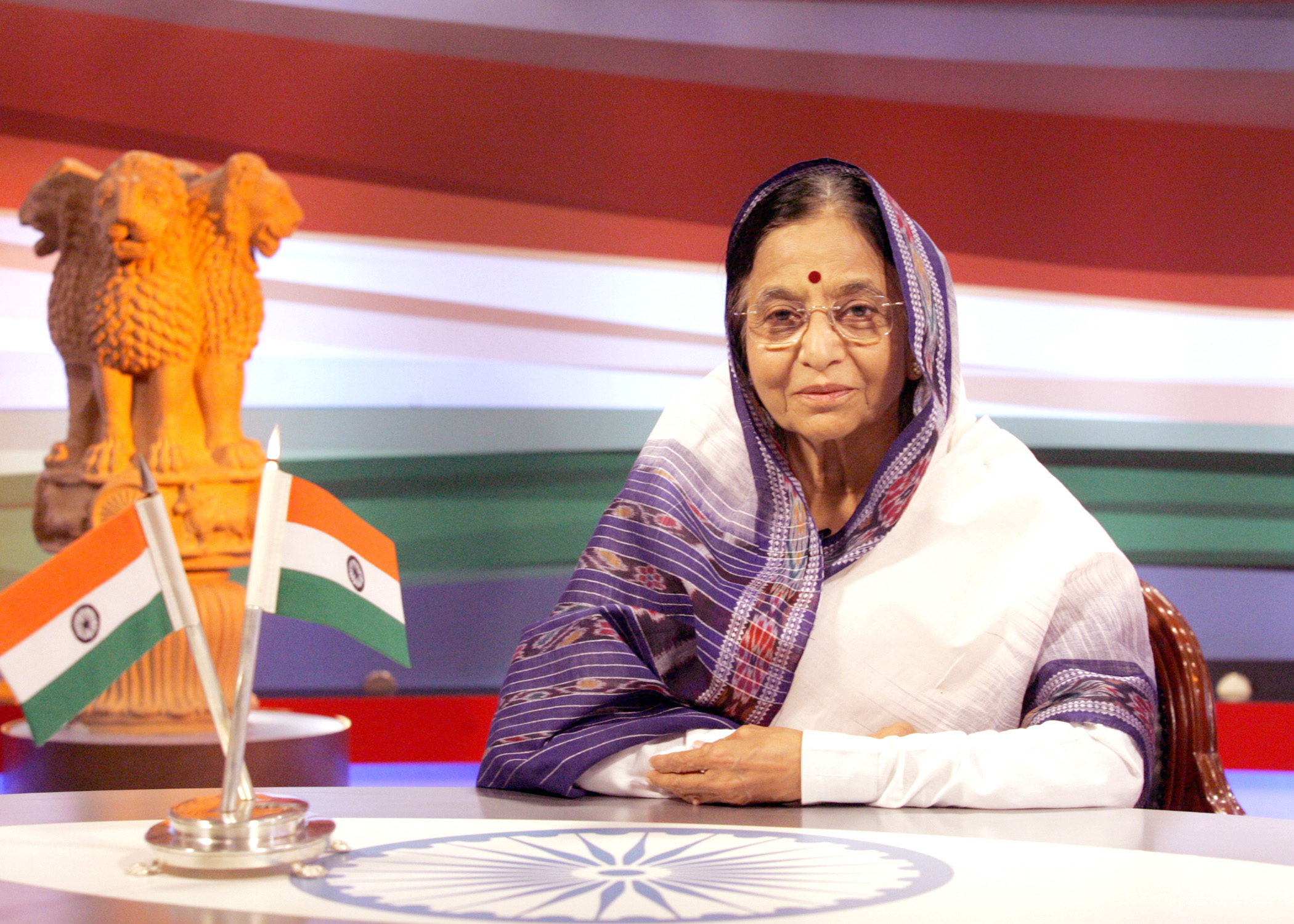
President Patil addressing the Indians on the eve of Independence Day, 2007

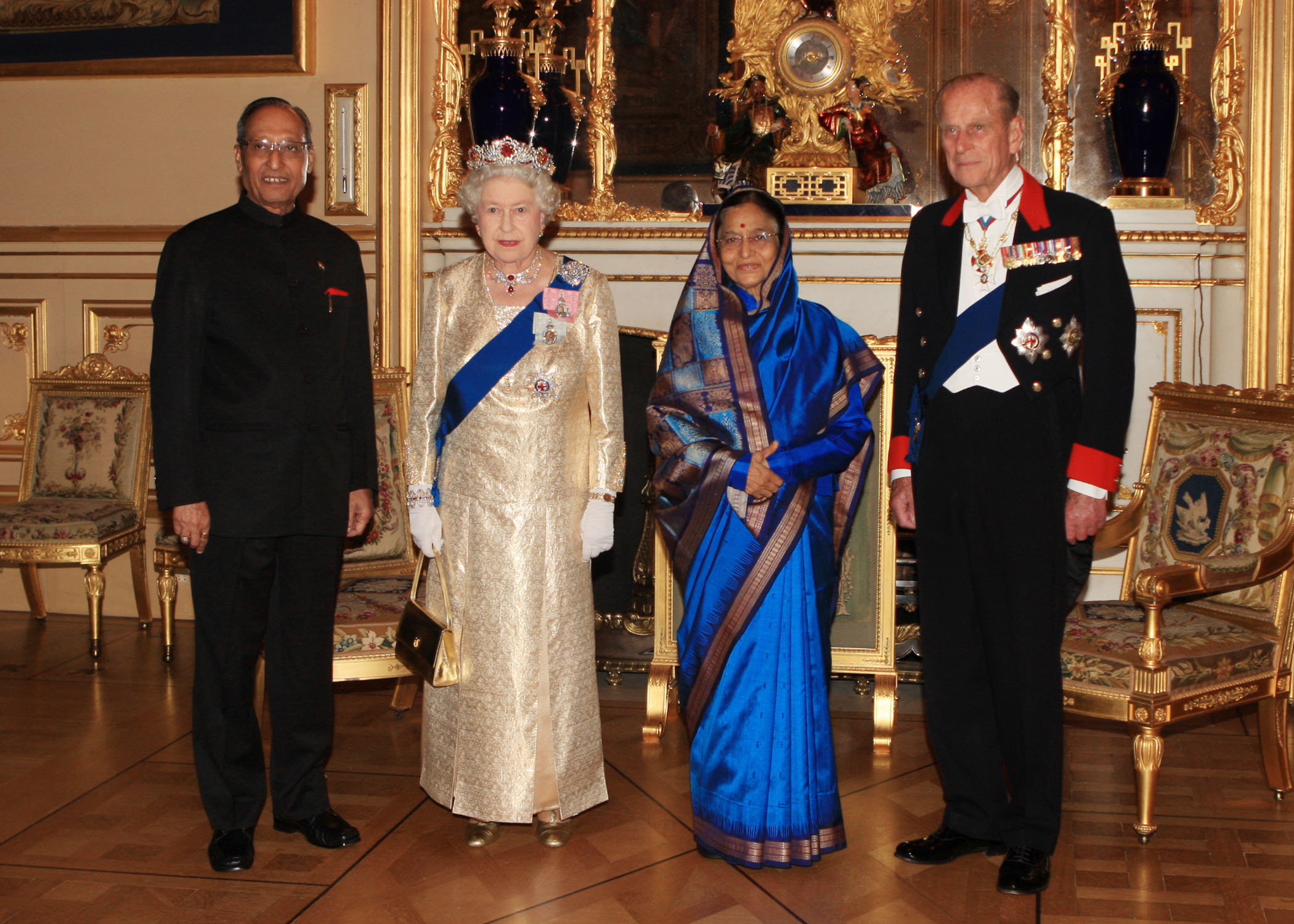
President Patil and her husband with the Queen and Prince Philip at Windsor Castle, 2009

Patil's term as the President of India saw various controversies and is widely considered as lackluster. She commuted death sentences of 35 petitioners to life, a record. President's Office, however, defended this by saying that President had granted clemency to the petitioners after due consideration and examining the advice of the Home Ministry.

Patil was noted for having spent more money on foreign trips, and having taken a greater number of foreign trips, than any previous president. Sometimes accompanied by as many as 11 members of her family, there had been 12 foreign trips spanning 22 countries by May 2012, when she was away on her 13th trip. Those completed travels had cost Rs 205 crore (Rs 2.05 billion). The Ministry of External Affairs said that taking family members "was not abnormal".

The Office of President has a five-year term and Patil retired from the role in July 2012.

Patil allegedly used public funds to build a retirement mansion on a 260,000 square feet (24,000 m^{2}) plot of military land in Pune. Tradition is that a retiring president either takes residence in Government accommodation in Delhi or moves back to their residence in their home state; her use of government money to build a retirement home at the end of the presidential term was unprecedented. Other controversies that arose after her retirement included her desire to claim both an official government car and fuel allowance for the running of a private car, despite rules clearly stipulating that this was an either/or situation. She also took possession of many gifts that had been given to her in her official role and was later forced to return them.

== Business interests ==
Patil set up Vidya Bharati Shikshan Prasarak Mandal, an educational institute which runs a chain of schools and colleges in Amravati, Jalgaon, Pune and Mumbai. She also set up Shram Sadhana Trust, which runs hostels for working women in New Delhi, Mumbai and Pune; and an engineering college for rural students in Jalgaon district. She also co-founded a cooperative sugar factory known as Sant Muktabai Sahakari Sakhar Karkhana at Muktainagar.

In addition, Patil founded a cooperative bank, Pratibha Mahila Sahakari Bank, that ceased trading in February 2003 when its licence was cancelled by the Reserve Bank of India. Among other failings, the bank had given illegal loans to her relatives that exceeded the bank's share capital. It had also given a loan to her sugar mill which was never repaid. The bank waived these loans, and this drove it into liquidation. The government liquidator of the bank, P. D. Nigam, said, "The fact that relatives of the founder chairperson (Pratibha Patil) were among those indiscriminately granted loans and that some illegal loan waivers were done has come up in our audit." Six of the top ten defaulters in the bank were linked to her relatives. The INC claimed that Patil had not been involved with the bank since 1994 but The Indian Express reported that it had official documents showing her involvement as late as 2002.

== Positions held ==
Pratibha Patil has held various official offices during her career. These are:

Period	Position
1967–72	Deputy Minister, Public Health, Prohibition, Tourism, Housing & Parliamentary Affairs, Government of Maharashtra
1972–79	Cabinet Minister, Social Welfare, Government of Maharashtra
1974–75	Cabinet Minister, Public Health & Social Welfare, Government of Maharashtra
1975–76	Cabinet Minister, Prohibition, Rehabilitation and Cultural Affairs, Government of Maharashtra
1977–78	Cabinet Minister, Education, Government of Maharashtra
1979–1980	Leader of the Opposition, Maharashtra Legislative Assembly
1982–85	Cabinet Minister, Urban Development and Housing, Government of Maharashtra
1983–85	Cabinet Minister, Civil Supplies and Social Welfare, Government of Maharashtra
1986–1988	Deputy Chairman, Rajya Sabha
1986–88	Chairman, Committee of Privileges, Rajya Sabha; Member, Business Advisory Committee, Rajya Sabha
1991–1996	Chairman, House Committee, Lok Sabha
8 November 2004 – 23 June 2007	Governor of Rajasthan
25 July 2007 – 25 July 2012	President of India

== Awards and honours ==
- Mexico:
  - Order of the Aztec Eagle, Sash of Special Category (3 August 2018)

== See also ==
- Presidency of Pratibha Patil
- List of elected and appointed female heads of state and government

Lok Sabha
Preceded by Sudam Deshmukh	Member of Parliament for Amravati; 1991–1996	Succeeded by Anant Gudhe
Political offices
Preceded by Madan Lal Khurana	Governor of Rajasthan; 2004–2007	Succeeded by Akhlaqur Rahman Kidwai
Preceded by A. P. J. Abdul Kalam	President of India; 2007–2012	Succeeded by Pranab Mukherjee
