= J Thomas & Co. Pvt. Ltd. =

Indian company

- Founded: 1861 (Calcutta)
- Founder: Robert Thomas
- Headquarters: Kolkata, India
- Key people: Kavi Seth (Chairman & MD); Arun K Chakraborti (Vice Chairman & MD); Akhil Narayan Sapru (MD); Gaurav Ghosh (MD); Satyajeet Hazarika (Director); Arijit Dasgupta (Director)
- Subsidiaries: Tea Consultancy & Plantation Services (India) Pvt. Ltd.; J. Thomas Trading & Investments Pvt. Ltd.; J. Thomas Finance Pvt. Ltd.; J. Thomas & Co. Auctioneers (Tamil Nadu) Pvt. Ltd.
- Website: www.jthomasindia.com

J Thomas & Co. Pvt. Ltd. is the largest and oldest existing tea auctioneers in the world, handling about 200 million kg of tea annually. The genesis of J Thomas was in Calcutta, the centre of tea trade in British India. The company is headquartered in Kolkata, West Bengal, India, and has branches in Siliguri, Guwahati, Dibrugarh, Kochi, Coonoor, Coimbatore and Bengaluru.

The company is owned by its employees.
