= The Totgars' Cooperative Sale Society Limited =

Farmer's co-operative in Karnataka, India

The Totagars' Co-operative Sales Society
- Trade name: TSS
- Founded: 1923
- Headquarters: Sirsi, India
- Number of locations: 4 (2023)
- Website: tssindia.in

The Totgars' Cooperative Sale Society Limited is a farmer's co-operative founded in 1923. It is located in Sirsi taluka of Uttara Kannada district of Karnataka an Indian state. The society had 23,000 members as mentioned in an end of 2016 news story. It is the second oldest betel nut cooperative in Karnataka.

== Etymology ==
The word totgar means orcharder in Kannada.

== History ==
The society started as "Sirsi Totgar's Co-operative Purchase-Distributive Credit Society Limited" in 1923. In 1929 it became "The Totgars' Co-operative Sale Society Limited.

- "The Tropical Agriculturalist, Volume 48 - 1917" mentions that the Sirsi Totgars got remunerative prices for their produce as they sold it through their societies.
- "Annual Administration Report on Working of the Co-operative Societies in Bombay State for the Year - 1931" mentions that though selling was good the functioning was not to satisfaction.
- "Annual Administration Report on the Working of Cooperative Societies - 1952" mentions that the society had a 1363 members and a working capital of Rs. 5.86 lakhs, a share capital of Rs. 1,21,580 and a reserve fund of Rs. 69,918. It sold agriculture produce worth Rs. 38,50,040 and made a profit of Rs. 29977.
- "Review of the Co-operative Movement in India, Volume 9 - 1958" makes a special mention of the society.

== Activities ==
Amongst the following are the activities of the society:

- Commission agent at Sirsi betel trading yard Sirsi with the biggest share (61% in 2015–16), the Sirsi yard is the largest for trading whole husked betel nut in the district.
- Purchase and sale of seeds, fertiliser, irrigation equipment and groceries.
- Cooperative banking.
- Issue of debit and credit cards.
- Renting of godown space.
- Loans against stock.
