= National Cooperative Development Corporation (India) =

Government agency of India

Agency overview
- Formed: 14 March 1963
- Jurisdiction: Government of India
- Headquarters: New Delhi, India
- Minister responsible: Amit Shah, Minister of Co-operation
- Agency executive: Shri Pankaj Kumar Bansal, IAS, Managing Director
- Parent department: Ministry of Co-operation, Government of India
- Website: ncdc.in

The National Cooperative Development Corporation (NCDC) is a statutory Corporation set up under an Act of Indian Parliament on 14 March 1963. The objectives of NCDC are planning and promoting programmes for production, processing, marketing, storage, export and import of agricultural produce, foodstuffs, industrial goods, livestock and certain other notified commodities and services on cooperative principles and for matters concerned therewith or incidental thereto.

== Functions ==
Planning, promoting and financing programmes for production, processing, marketing, storage, export and import of agricultural produce, food stuffs, certain other notified commodities e.g. fertilisers, insecticides, agricultural machinery, lac, soap, kerosene oil, textile, rubber etc., supply of consumer goods and collection, processing, marketing, storage and export of minor forest produce through cooperatives, besides income generating stream of activities such as poultry, dairy, fishery, sericulture, handloom etc.

NCDC Act has been further amended which will broad base the area of operation of the Corporation to assist different types of cooperatives and to expand its financial base. NCDC will now be able to finance projects in the rural industrial cooperative sectors and for certain notified services in rural areas like water conservation, irrigation and micro irrigation, agri-insurance, agro-credit, rural sanitation, animal health, etc.

Corporation can also go in for direct funding of project under its various schemes of assistance on fulfilment of stipulated condition.

Loans and grants are advanced to state government for financing primary and secondary level cooperative societies and direct to the national level and other societies having objects extending beyond one state.

== Organisation & Management ==
The Management vests in 51 member widely represented General Council to give shape to its policies and programmes and Board of Management with 12 members to cater to day-to-day activities. Besides its Head Office, NCDC functions through 18 Regional/State Directorates. The Managing Director is the Chief Executive. Various functional divisions look after the programmes. The field offices play an important role in project identification/formulation and oversee its implementation. NCDC is endowed with in-house technical and managerial capabilities in the areas of Cooperation, Organisation & Methods, Financial Management, Management Information Systems, Sugar, Oilseeds, Textiles, Fruits & Vegetables, Dairy, Poultry and Live stock, Fishery, Handlooms, and Healthcare infrastructure to help cooperatives to identify/formulate projects and successfully implement them.

As of October 2020 it has eighteen Regional Directorates at Bengaluru, Bhopal, Bhubaneswar, Chandigarh, Chennai, Dehradun, Gandhinagar, Guwahati, Hyderabad, Jaipur, Kolkata, Lucknow, Patna, Pune, Raipur, Ranchi, Shimla and Thiruvananthapuram to provide the financial assistance to Cooperatives/Societies/Federations.
