= SRC Holdings Corp. =

American equipment company

SRC Holdings Corporation
- Type: Remanufacturing company
- Industry: Manufacturing
- Founded: 1983
- Founder: Jack Stack and managers from International Harvester
- Headquarters: Springfield, Missouri, United States
- Number of locations: 4
- Products: Remanufactured equipment for agriculture, automotive, construction, mining, oil & gas, trucking industries; industrial power units
- Services: Logistics, remanufacturing, kitting & packaging, supply chain, vendor managed inventory
- Revenue: $400 million
- Owner: 100% employee-owned
- Number of employees: 2,000
- Parent: SRC Holdings
- Subsidiaries: Springfield ReManufacturing Corp; SRC Automotive, Inc.; SRC Electrical LLC; SRC of Lexington, Inc.; SRC Logistics, Inc.; The Great Game of Business, Inc.; Global Recovery Corp; NewStream Enterprises LLC; CNH Reman; Ceramex North America LL
- Website: www.srcholdings.com

SRC Holdings Corp (SRC) is an American equipment company based in Springfield, Missouri.

== History ==
SRC was established in 1983 when 13 employees of International Harvester purchased a part of that company that remanufactured truck engines, with $100,000 of their own money and $8.9 million in loans, with the goal of saving 119 jobs. By 1988, SRC's debt to equity ratio was down to 1.8 to 1, and the business had a value of $43 million. The stock price, $0.10 in 1983, had increased to $13 per share. By 2015, the stock was worth over $199 per share.

SRC founded and invested in more than 60 separate companies that do everything from consulting to packaging to building high-performance engines. Including current joint-ventures SRC's sales are over $600M, with more than 2,000 employees, and has three million square feet (280,000 m^{2}) of manufacturing and warehousing space.

== Books ==
President and CEO Jack Stack has written two books (with Bo Burlingham): The Great Game of Business and A Stake in the Outcome, detailing the business and management techniques practiced and promoted by the company. The Great Game of Business has had 25 printings, has sold over 350,000 copies in 14 languages, and has been cited in over 100 business books. Stack wrote a third book in 2020 with Darren Dahl, Change the Game: Saving the American Dream by Closing the Gap Between the Haves and the Have-Nots.

== Award ==
The 2019 Txemi Cantera International Social Economy Prize was awarded by ASLE to SRC and its President, Jack Stack.
