= Aavin =

Indian state government cooperative

- Type: State government cooperative
- Industry: Dairy
- Predecessor: Department of Dairy Development (1958–1972); Tamil Nadu Dairy Development Corporation Limited (1972–1981)
- Founded: February 1, 1981; 45 years ago in Tamil Nadu, India
- Headquarters: Chennai, Tamil Nadu, India
- Area served: Worldwide
- Products: Milk-based products
- Revenue: ▲₹5,994 crore (US$640 million) (2018–19)
- Owner: Government of Tamil Nadu (Dairy Development Department)
- Number of employees: 805 (Apex); 4,273 (District Cadre)
- Website: aavin.tn.gov.in

Aavin is an Indian dairy brand of the Tamil Nadu Co-operative Milk Producers' Federation Limited (TCMPF), a state government dairy cooperative operating under the Department of Dairy Development, Government of Tamil Nadu. Through a three-tier cooperative structure, the federation procures milk from district-level unions and primary village societies, processes it and sells liquid milk and milk-based products to consumers across Tamil Nadu and other states.

The company produces a wide range of dairy products, including ghee, butter, yogurt, chocolates, ice cream, khoa, sweets, paneer etc;

Aavin contributes to the milk production of India through a network of 9,189 primary milk producer cooperative societies across Tamil Nadu

== History ==
The Dairy Development Department was established in Tamil Nadu in 1958 to oversee and regulate milk production and commercial distribution across the state. Administrative and statutory control over all dairy co-operatives was officially transferred to the department on 1 August 1965. In 1972, the commercial activities of the department were shifted to the newly formed Tamil Nadu Dairy Development Corporation Limited. Following the adoption of the "Anand pattern" cooperative model, this cooperation was succeeded by the Tamil Nadu Cooperative Milk Producers' Federation Limited (TCMPF) which was registered on 1 February 1981. The federation processes and markets its dairy products under the trademark Aavin. Tamil Nadu ranks among the leading Indian states in milk production with about 14.5 million liters per day and currently has 1 crore daily consumers.

The name Aavin is a portmanteau of the Tamil words "Aa" (ஆ) meaning "cow" and "Aavin Paal" (ஆவின் பால்) which translates literally to "cow's milk".

In April 2020, during the COVID-19 pandemic TCMPF partnered with Swiggy to retail and deliver its dairy products directly to consumers. Under this arrangement, doorstep deliveries of Aavin products across eight distinct categories were fulfilled from 21 distribution outlets across Chennai.

In July 2020, the federation launched an initiative inviting auto-rickshaw and taxi drivers to act as "mobile agents" across Tamil Nadu. This program aimed to boost dairy product sales while simultaneously providing a livelihood to transport workers struggling financially due to pandemic lockdown restrictions.

According to company reports for the 2019-2020 fiscal year, Aavin procured roughly 40 lakh litres of milk per day. Of this volume, 25 lakh litres were distributed as liquid milk, while the remaining supply was processed into value-added commodities such as skimmed milk powder, ice creams, buttermilk, curd, ghee and butter. For the same financial period, the company recordeda an annual turnover of ₹5,800 crore with monthly milk sales climbing from ₹34.78 crore to ₹41.15 crore.

== Activities ==
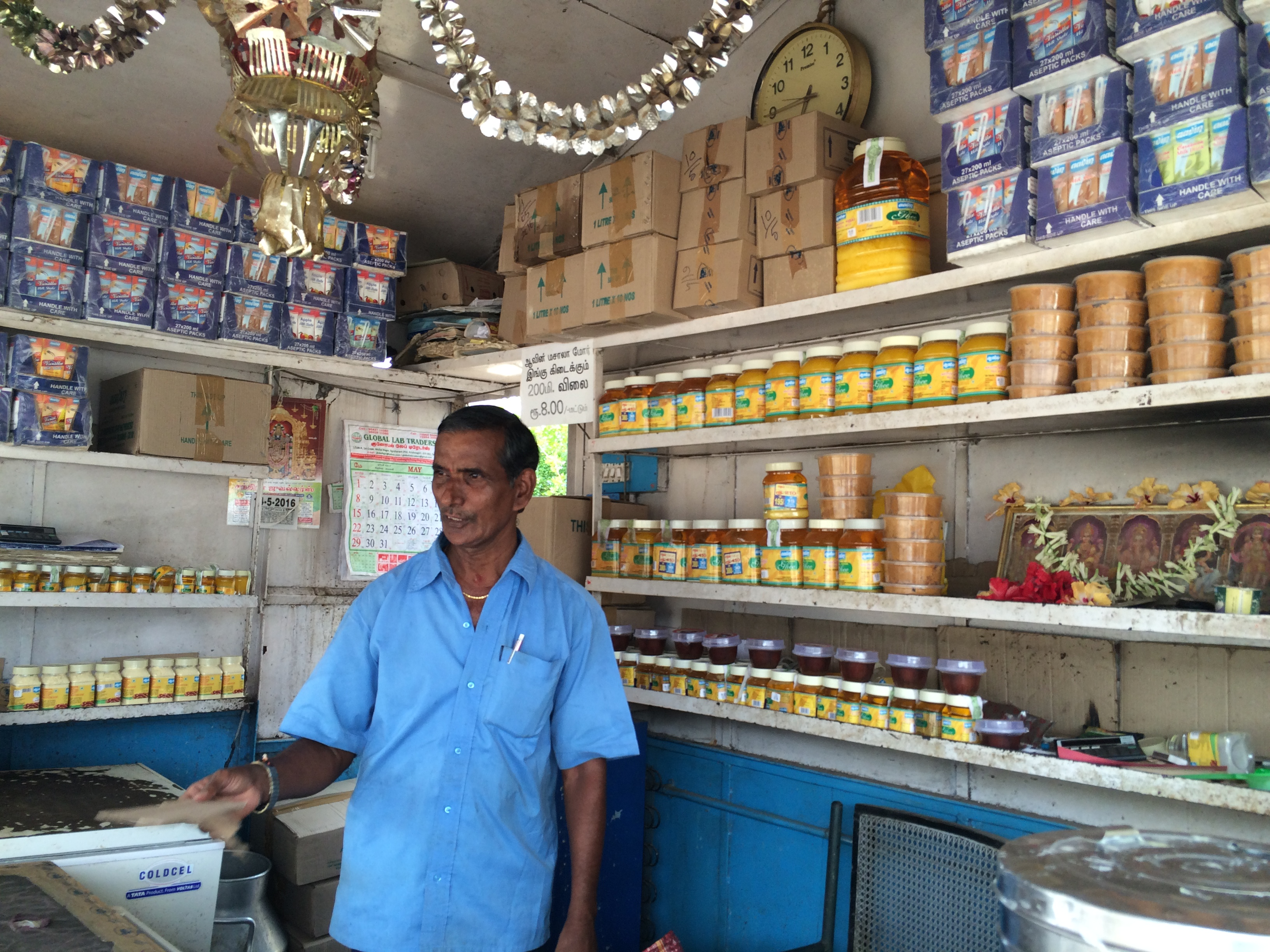
Aavin Milk Outlet, Tamilnadu

The Tamil Nadu Co-operative Milk Producers' Federation Limited (TCMPF) acts as the apex body for the state's District Cooperative Milk Producers' Unions. By procuring milk directly from villagers the federation aids in the economic development of rural farming communities while facilitating the large-scale processing and manufacturing of dairy products.

The federation is headquartered at Aavin Illam in Madhavaram Milk Colony, Chennai. TCMPF directly manages four major metro dairies to serve the Chennai region and surrounding areas:

- Madhavaram Dairy – capacity of 5.0 LLPD (Lakh Litres Per Day)
- Ambattur Dairy – capacity of 5.0 LLPD
- Sholinganallur Dairy – capacity of 4.5 LLPD
- Ambattur Product Dairy – dedicated to manufacturing value-added milk products, ice cream, and fermented items like paneer and buttermilk.

These metro dairies collect milk from the district unions, process and pack it in sachets and distribute it to consumers. The organisation procures an average of 38 to 40 lakh litres of milk per day and has integrated cloud-based technology to monitor milk quality, quantity, pricing, and temperature control in real-time. The first Hi-Tech Aavin parlour in Coimbatore is opened on March 2021 and Coimbatore plant has capacity of 2 LLPD currently.

In February 2021, former Chief Minister of Tamil Nadu Edappadi K Palaniswami laid the foundation stone for two major Aavin plants to be constructed at Virudhunagar. The Enjar village unit is being constructed at ₹70.15 crore and will fill high-temperature milk automatically in tetra packets. The daily average output at this unit will be around 25,000 tetra packs. The second plant in Srivalliputhur will produce milk products like yoghurt, curd, lassi, buttermilk and other probiotics. Both the plants are being financed by National Bank for Agriculture and Rural Development (NABARD).

In February 2021, Aavin floated a tender to construct an ice cream plant with a capacity of 6,000 litres per day at the company's Kottapattu complex on the Trichy-Pudukkottai national highway. It was proposed to be constructed at a cost of ₹43 crore under the Dairy Processing and Infrastructure Development Fund (DIDF). It will also house a fermented dairy production unit with a capacity of 10,000 litres/day and allied infrastructure.

In September 2017, Aavin announced that it would be launching seven varieties of milk-based sweets for Deepavali.

Tamil Nadu Co-operative Milk Producers' Federation Limited entered into agreements with six vendors for sale of milk and milk products produced by it within India and export to United Arab Emirates, Ajman, Oman, Qatar, Canada and US and earn around ₹6 crores per year.

== Controversies ==
In 2012, there were widespread rumors about the milk being adulterated when it was being transported from cooperative societies to dairies. In 2014, a major adulteration racket was busted by the police in Villupuram district. The modus operandi of the gang was to transfer cans of milk from transport that carried pure milk from Chennai to Tiruvannamalai and replace it with an equal quantity of water. Aavin said that it lost an estimated ₹10 crore (US$1.1 million) due to the racket.

== See also ==
- Ministry of Fisheries, Animal Husbandry and Dairying
- White Revolution
