= Krishak Bharati Cooperative =

Indian cooperative fertilizer manufacturer

Krishak Bharati Cooperative Limited
- Type: National level cooperative federation.
- Industry: Fertilizer
- Founded: 17 April 1980
- Founder: Government of india
- Headquarters: KRIBHCO Bhawan, A-10, Sector-1, NOIDA, Gautam Budh Nagar, U.P, India, 201301, India
- Area served: India
- Key people: V. Sudhakar Chowdary, Chairman; Dr. Chandra Pal Singh, Vice-Chairman; S.S. Yadav, Managing Director; Manish Kumar, Finance Director
- Products: Fertilizers
- Net income: ▲₹16,598 crore (US$1.7 billion) (2023–24)
- Website: www.kribhco.net

Krishak Bharati Cooperative Limited (KRIBHCO) is a national level multistate cooperative society under the Ministry of Cooperation, Government of India. Mr. Manish Kumar, an IIT Delhi alumnus, currently serves as the Director (Finance).

The cooperative was ranked 382nd on the Fortune India 500 list of India's biggest corporations in 2023, up from 446th in 2022.

== History ==
KRIBHCO was incorporated on 17 April 1980 as a national level Multi State Cooperative Society by Government of India to implement first gas based high capacity Fertilizer Complex consisting of 2 x 1890 MTPD Ammonia plants and 4 x 1662.5 MTPD Urea plants each with annual installed capacity of 8.91 Lakh MT Ammonia and 14.52 lakh MT of Urea at Hazira District-Surat, Gujarat, India based on natural gas from Bombay High/ South Bassein. Hazira fertilizer complex was commissioned in 1985 in record time with saving of Rs. 90 crore in project cost.

In an endeavor to make constant improvements, KRIBHCO implemented various schemes to enhance its capacity and improve the energy consumption. Capacities of ammonia & urea plants were reassessed to 2x1520 MTPD Ammonia and 4x 1310 MTPD Urea with annual installed capacity of 10.03 Lakh MT ammonia and 17.29 lakh MT of urea.

The Hazira Fertilizer Complex was subsequently revamped in 2013 to increase its production capacity by 4.65 LMTPA of Urea. After the revamp, the rated capacity has been enhanced to 2x3325 MTPD Urea (21.95 LMTPA) and 2 x 1890 MTPD Ammonia (12.47 LMTPA). With this, the Hazira fertilizer complex has become the largest single location urea plant in India.

KRIBHCO owns a gas based Fertilizer Complex at Shahjahanpur, U.P. strategically located in North India, in high urea consumption belt. The fertilizer complex consists of 1520 MPTD Ammonia Plant (annual capacity of 5.02 Lakh MT) and 2620 MTPD Urea Plant (annual capacity of 8.64 Lakh MT). The Fertilizer Plant is and based on Natural Gas as feedstock supplied through the Hazira-Vijaypur-Jagdishpur ("HVJ") gas pipeline. Kribhco Shahjahanpur plant is the latest Greenfield urea plant in India.

Expansion & Diversifications

KRIBHCO has also made realignment in its corporate strategy and internal operations revamping to meet the challenges in the liberalized/globalized economy. As a part of above initiative, KRIBHCO entered into overseas Joint Ventures, diversification into Power Sector, Logistics Business, Agribusiness, Green Energy etc.

In 2005, KRIBHCO's Joint Venture project with Oman Oil Company came on stream in Sultanate of Oman. KRIBHCO holds 25% equity in OMIFCO.

Kribhco Fertilizer Limited (formerly Kribhco Shyam Fertilizer Ltd) is a 100% subsidiary of KRIBHCO. KRIBHCO has diversified into power sector by investing in Gujarat State Energy Generation (GSEG). KRIBHCO had incorporated Kribhco Infrastructure Limited(KRIL)which is into logistics business, in which it now owns 26% stake . KRIBHCO holds 2.34% equity in Nagarjuna Oil Refinery Limited and 1.84% in Nagarjuna Fertilizers and Chemicals Ltd. KRIBHCO holds 5% equity in Indian Commodity Exchange (ICEX)New products and marketing initiatives. Recently It has diversified into Agribusiness and Green energy by establishing two wholly owned Subsidiaries.

KRIBHCO has been promoting the use of bio-fertilisers for many years. The society has three units to manufacture bio-fertilisers at Hazira (Gujarat), Varanasi (Uttar Pradesh) and Lanjha (Maharashtra). The Society markets one of its Kind Liquid Bio Fertilisers which are consortia of different microbes. KRIBHCO is also marketing high yielding Hybrid seeds of various crops like Bt Cotton. KRIBHCO imports and markets other fertilizers like DAP, NPKs, MAP, MOP etc. from time to time. It also markets speciality nutrients like Zinc Sulphate, Potash Derived from Molasses etc. Organic Agriculture has emerged as a feasible option to address concerns relating to land degradations. KRIBHCO regularly undertakes marketing of compost made from city waste.

== Urea plants ==
1. Hazira plant

2. Shahjahanpur plant

== Biofertilizer plants ==
1. Hazira (Gujarat)

2. Lanja Ratnagiri (Maharashtra)

3. Varanasi (Uttar pradesh)

== Subsidiaries ==
1. Kribhco Fertilizer Limited (KFL)

2. Kribhco Infrastructure Limited (KRIL)

3. Oman India Fertiliser Company (OMIFCO)

4. Gramin Vikas Trust (GVT)

5. Gujarat State Energy Generation Limited (GSEG)

6. Private jetty

7. Kribhco Agribusiness Private Limited

8. KRIBHCO Green Energy Private Limited
