= Indian Farmers Fertiliser Cooperative =

Indian multi-state cooperative society

Indian Farmers Fertiliser Cooperative (IFFCO)
- Type: Cooperative society
- Founded: 3 November 1967
- Founder: Udaybhansinhji Natwarsinhji Jethwa
- Headquarters: New Delhi, India
- Area served: India
- Key people: Dileep Sanghani (Chairman); Balveer Singh (vice chairman); K J Patel (MD and CEO)
- Products: Fertilisers
- Revenue: ▲₹42,662 crore (US$4.4 billion) (FY25)
- Net income: ▲₹2,823 crore (US$290 million) (FY25)
- Website: www.iffco.in

Indian Farmers Fertiliser Cooperative Limited, also known as IFFCO, is a multi-state cooperative society engaged in the manufacture and marketing of fertiliser. IFFCO is headquartered in New Delhi, India. Started in 1967 with 57 member cooperatives, it is today the 2nd largest co-operative in the world by turnover on GDP per capita (as per World Cooperative Monitor 2025), with around 35,000 member cooperatives reaching over 50 million Indian farmers.

With around 19% market share in urea and around 31% market share in complex fertilisers (P_{2}O_{5} terms), IFFCO is India's largest fertiliser manufacturer.

The cooperative was ranked 66th on the Fortune India 500 list of India's biggest corporations as of 2017, with a net worth of $2.6 billion as of March 2021.

== History ==
1960s

The food crisis of the early '60s mobilized India's farmers and the founding fathers of a 'young' India to look for longer-term solutions. International organizations, including the American Co-operative Study Team, conducted fertiliser feasibility studies in India to increase production. The cooperative sector in India at that time was distributing 70 per cent of the chemical fertilizers consumed in the country. This sector had adequate infrastructure to distribute fertilisers but no production facilities. With the introduction of multi-agency approach by the Government of India in the distribution of fertilizers during 1967, the private sector also entered the field of fertilizer distribution. Private sector production units provided more opportunities to the distribution network of private trade and gave secondary preference to the cooperatives in the matter of supplies. Due to this development, the cooperatives started getting less supplies of the fertilizers.

To overcome this limitation and also to bridge the growing demand for fertilizer in the country, a new cooperative was conceived. The notion of the cooperative was especially appealing for its core values of self-help, accountability, democracy, equality, equity and solidarity. In 1964, the Cooperative League of USA proposed to the Government of India that American cooperatives were interested in collaborating with Indian cooperatives in setting up fertiliser production capacity.

The idea appealed to the Government of India and eminent cooperators of the country. As a result, Indian Farmers Fertilizer Cooperative Limited (IFFCO) was conceived and registered on 3 November 1967, as a multi-unit cooperative society with the primary objective of production and distribution of fertilizers. American cooperatives, through Cooperative Fertilizer International (CFI) provided financial aid as well as technical know-how to IFFCO. 1967 saw proposals submitted for Ammonia, Urea and NPK plants, notably at Kalol and Kandla in Gujarat, and on 3 November 1967, IFFCO was registered as a multi-unit cooperative.

1970s

The Kalol and Kandla plants were commissioned and built with great innovations and indigenous materials. In 1974, the plant at Kalol, Gujarat was inaugurated and project work for two more plants was initiated.

1980s

Two more Urea plants were commissioned at Phulpur and Aonla in Uttar Pradesh. IFFCO's founding managing director: Mr. Paul Pothen received the Padma Shri award for his contribution to the revival and growth of India's agricultural and farming community. Eventually, IFFCO also became a stakeholder in Industries Chimiques Du Senegal (ICS), Senegal's biggest industrial venture to manufacture phosphoric acid.

1990s

The Kalol, Kandla, Phulpur and Aonla plants were expanded to increase production capacity and improve production technology to meet the increasing demand for IFFCO fertilizers and meet the growing demand for food in India. This was the decade of major transformation, which set the foundation for the growth that the organisation was about to undertake in forthcoming years. The process led to significant expansion in capacity and capabilities of the manufacturing units, and a phenomenal increase in the operational efficiency of the plants, bringing them at par with the highest global standards. To further improve productivity and profitability, an impetus was put on getting IFFCO on the global map and Joint Ventures were established in Oman, Jordan and Dubai. Business interests were also diversified beyond fertilizer, to sectors like General insurance, rural telephony, international trading, pesticides and even rural e-commerce. These steps proved to be a game changer and catapulted IFFCO into a new era.

2000s

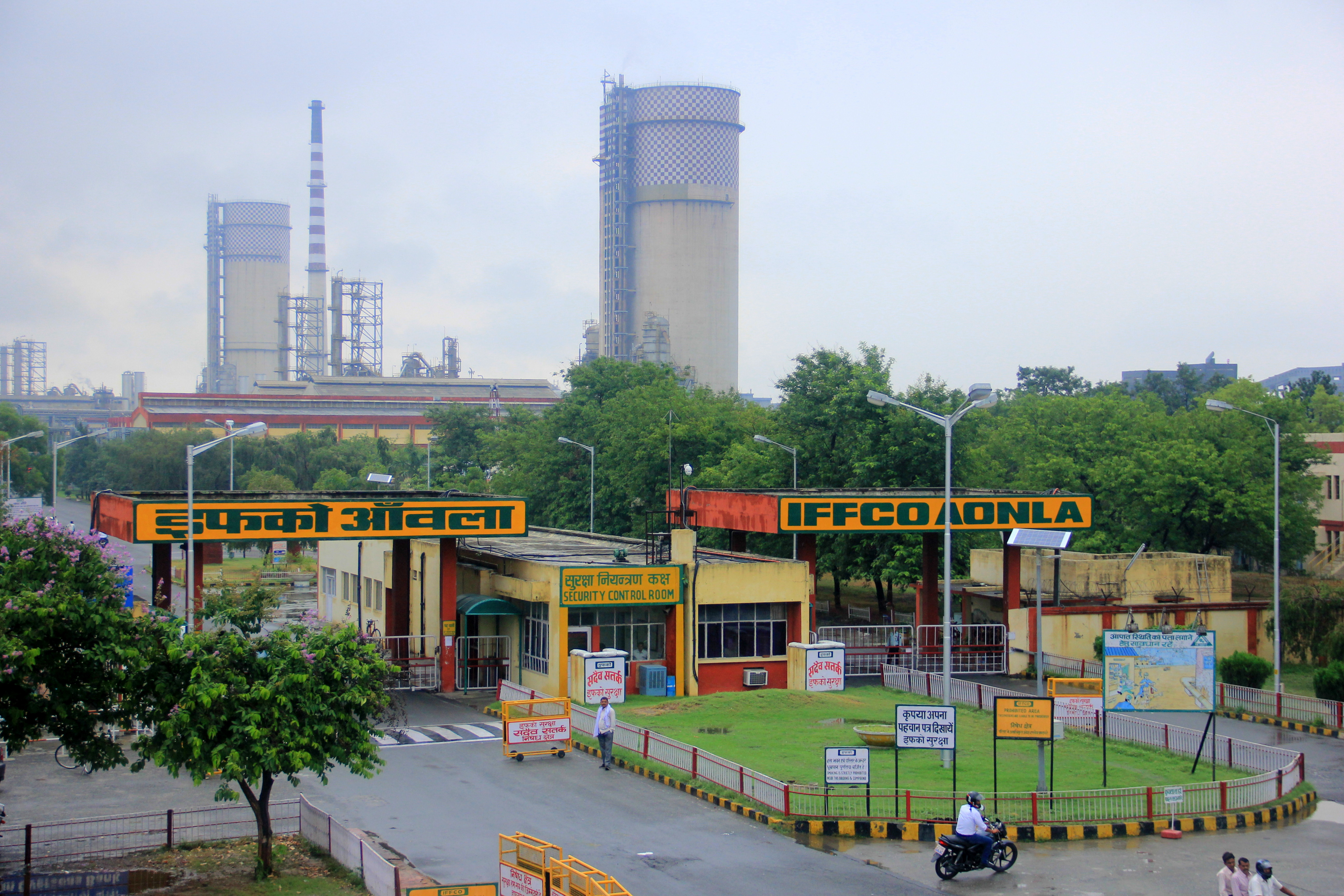
A view of the IFFCO plant at Aonla, Uttar Pradesh

IFFCO became an autonomous cooperative, expanding its presence and partnerships in India and abroad. 2000 saw the establishing of IFFCO Tokio General Insurance Company Ltd., and the launch of customized rural-centric insurance products. IFFCO acquired shareholding in the Oman India Fertilizer Company. The Paradeep plant was acquired, and the Kisan International Trading FZE (KIT), a wholly owned subsidiary for imports, exports and logistics support for fertilizers, raw materials and intermediates, was set up in Dubai. IFFCO also made forays into Jordan, established Jordan India Fertilizer Company L.L.C and promoted IFFCO Kisan Sanchar Ltd, a unique venture to bring the benefits of modern mobile communications to rural India.

2010s

IFFCO embarked on several expansion and diversification plans to increase its domestic fertilizer production capacity. These plans also included the acquisition of more plants, further overseas joint ventures and the introduction of several energy reduction measures to improve production efficiency and minimize carbon footprint. In a joint venture with Mitsubishi Corporation, Japan, IFFCO-MC Crop Science Private Limited was incorporated to provide quality agrochemicals in India. The IFFCO BAZAR was envisioned to introduce modern retail and information experience to rural India, by combining technology with experience to deliver value to consumers in the Indian hinterland.

== Plants ==
- Kalol, Gujarat: Commissioned in 1975 and expanded in 1997, it produces ammonia (1100 MTPD) and urea (1650 MTPD).
- Kandla, Gujarat: Commissioned in 1975 and first expanded in 1981 and again in 1999, it produces NPK (10:26:26; Capacity 520,000 MTPD), NPK (12:32:16; Capacity 700,000 MTPD), NP (20:20:0:13), DAP (18:46:0; Capacity 1,200,000 MTPD) and water-soluble fertilisers.
- Phulpur, Uttar Pradesh: Commissioned in 1981 and expanded in 1997, it produced ammonia (9.7 lakh MT) and urea (17 lakh MT).
- Aonla, Uttar Pradesh: Commissioned in 1988 and expanded in 1996, it produced ammonia (1740 MTPD) and urea (1515 MTPD).
- Paradeep, Odisha: Taken over in 2005, it produces phosphoric acid (8,75,000 MTPA), sulphuric acid (23,10,000 MTPA), NPK (10:26:26), NPK (12:32:16), NP (20:20:0:13) and DAP (18:46:0) grade of fertilisers.

=== Overseas joint ventures ===
•Sur, Oman: Oman India fertiliser company (OMIFCO) with 25% IFFCO's shareholding, designed to produce 1.652 million tons granulated urea and 0.255-million-ton ammonia annually.

• Eshidiya ,Jordan: Jordan India fertiliser company (JIFCO) with 27% IFFCO shareholding phosphoric acid plant with annual capacity of 4.75 lakhs tones of phosphoric acid in terms of P205.

== Associates and subsidiaries ==
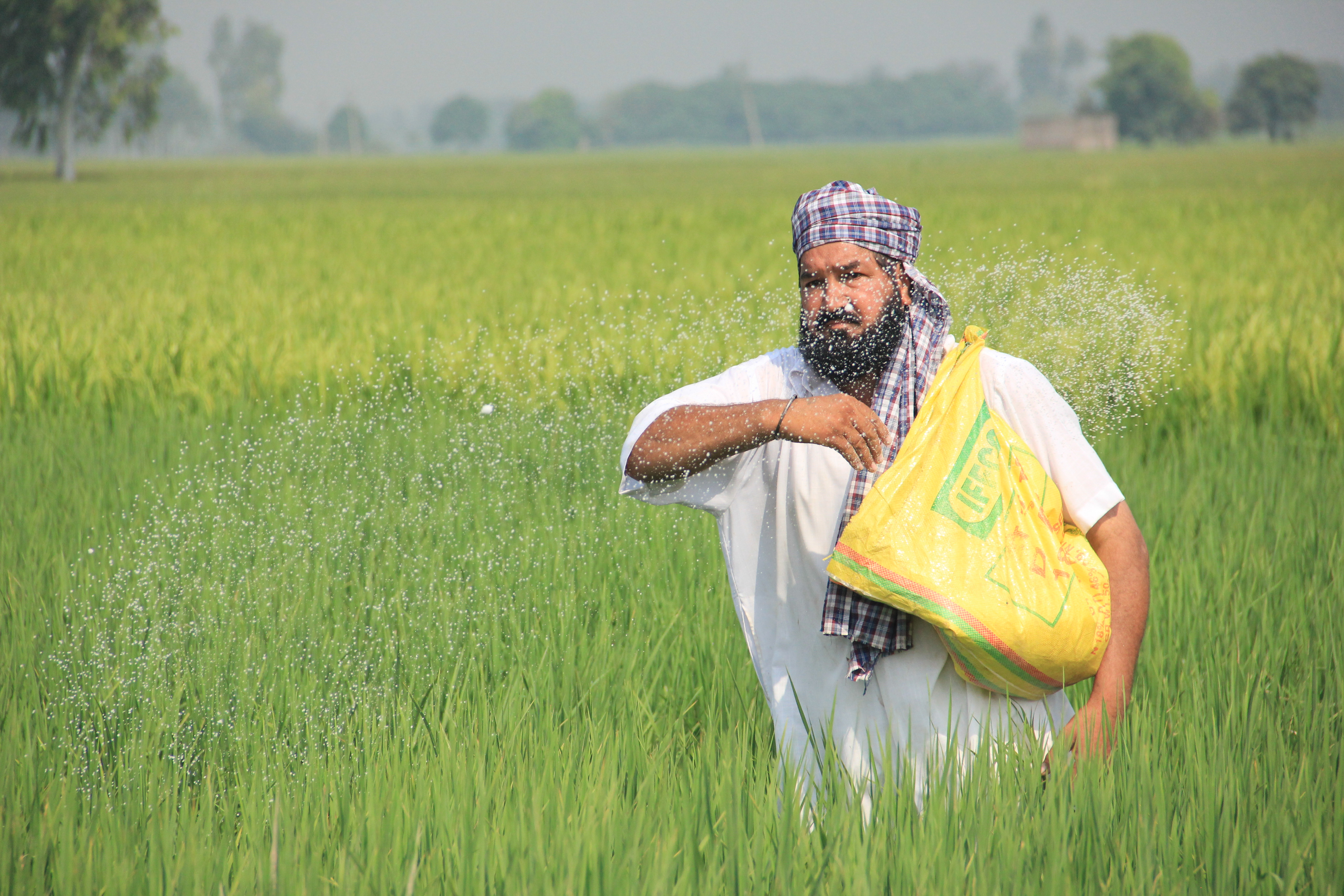
A farmer using fertiliser on his fields

- IFFCO Tokio General Insurance Company Limited
- IFFCO eBazar Limited
- IFFCO Kisan SEZ Limited
- IFFCO Kisan Sanchar Limited
- IFFCO-MC Crop Science Private Limited
- IFFCO Kisan Finance Limited
- Oman India Fertiliser Company SAOC
- National Commodity & Derivatives Exchange Ltd.
- Kisan International Trading FZE
- Indian Potash Limited
- Jordan India Fertilizer Company LLC
- Sikkim IFFCO Organics Limited
- Industries Chemiques Du Senegal
- CN IFFCO Private Limited

== See also ==
- Cooperative movement in India
- Fortune India 500
- List of companies of India
