= List of textile and clothing trade unions =

Textile and clothing trade unions are labor unions that represent workers in the textile industry and garment industry. A partial list is as follows.

International

- IndustriALL Global Union (Switzerland)
- International Trade Union Confederation (Belgium)

Africa

- Southern African Clothing and Textile Workers Union (South Africa)

Asia

- All India Jute Textile Workers' Federation (India)
- Bengal Chatkal Mazdoor Federation (India)
- Bengal Chatkal Mazdoor Union (India)
- Bengal Jute Mill Workers' Union (India)
- Bengal Provincial Chatkal Mazdoor Union (India)
- Bunkar Mahasabha (India)
- Coimbatore District Textile Workers Union (India)
- Federation of Chatkal Mazdoor Unions (India)
- National Committee of the Chinese Financial, Commercial, Light Industry, Textile and Tobacco Workers' Union (People's Republic of China)
- National Union of Jute Workers (India)
- Pondicherry Textile Labour Union (India)
- Powerloom Workers Union (India)
- Rashtriya Mill Mazdoor Sangh (India)

Australia

- Australian Workers Union (Australia)
- Clothing, Laundry and Allied Workers Union of Aotearoa (New Zealand)
- Textile, Clothing and Footwear Union of Australia (Australia)
- United Voice (Australia)

Europe

- Community (United Kingdom)
- Fédération française de la couture (France)
- GMB (trade union) (United Kingdom)
- United Federation of Trade Unions (Norway)
- Transport and General Workers Union (United Kingdom)

North America

- UNITE HERE (United States)
- Workers United (United States)
