= Ministry of Railways (India) =

Government ministry of India

- Branch of Government of India

- Ministry of Railways

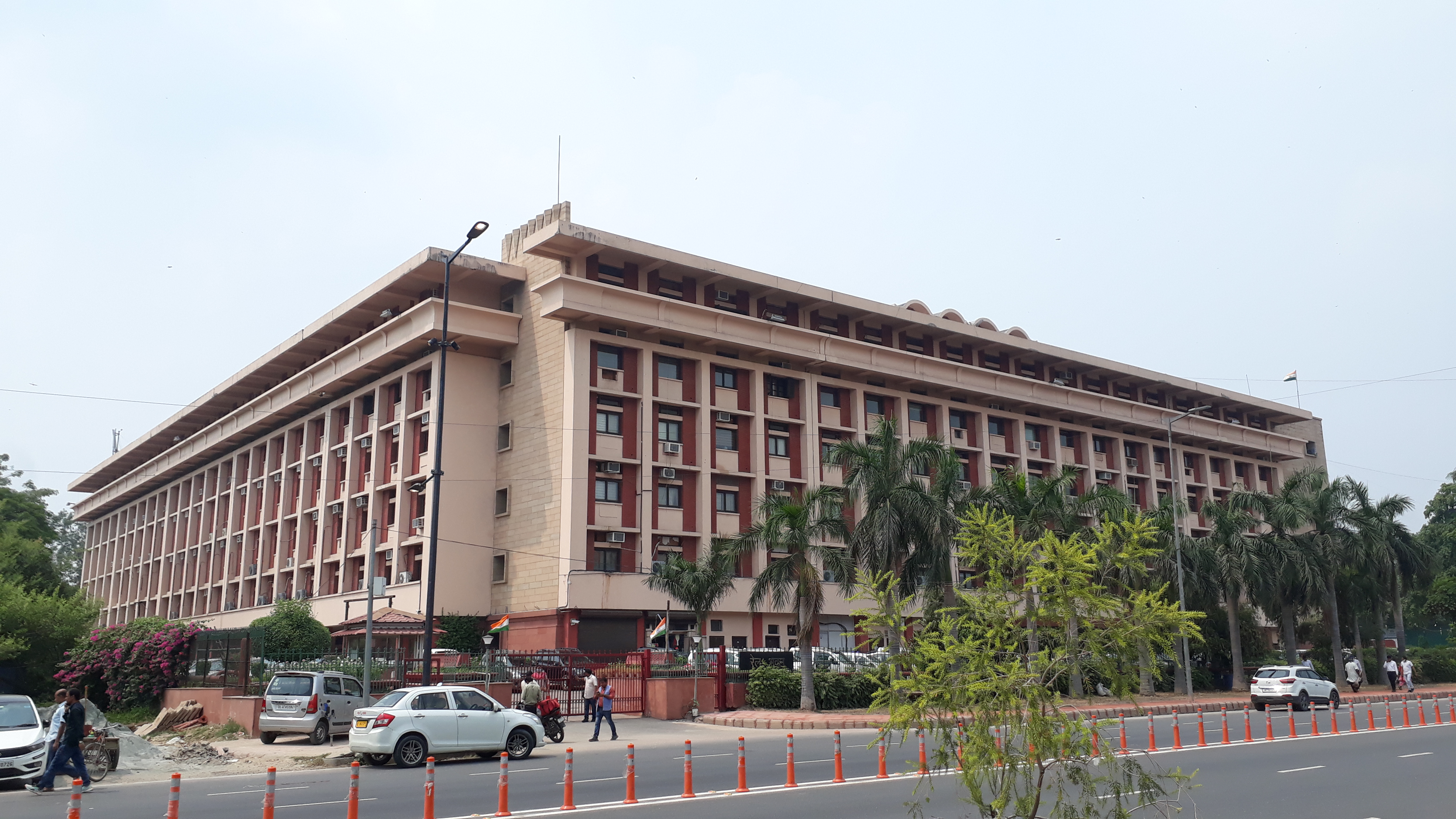
- Rail Bhavan in New Delhi, the seat of the Ministry of Railways

Ministry overview
- Formed: March 1905
- Jurisdiction: Government of India
- Headquarters: Rail Bhavan 1, Raisina Road, New Delhi, India
- Employees: 1,212,882 (2022)
- Annual budget: ₹299,059 crore (US$31 billion) (2025–26)
- Minister responsible: Ashwini Vaishnaw, Minister of Railways
- Deputy Ministers responsible: V. Somanna, Minister of State; Ravneet Singh Bittu, Minister of State
- Ministry executive: Satish Kumar,IRSME, Chairman & CEO, Railway Board
- Child agencies: Indian Railways; DFCCIL
- Website: www.indianrailways.gov.in

The Ministry of Railways is a ministry in the Government of India, responsible for the country's rail transport. The Indian Railways is the rail network operated and administered by the Railway Board constituted by the ministry. The ministry along with the Railway Board is housed inside Rail Bhawan in New Delhi. It is headed by the Minister of Railways. With more than 1.2 million employees, it is one of the world's largest employers.

== History ==
The first railway track was operational in Madras in 1837 and the first passenger train ran in Bombay in 1853. But the earlier railways were operated by private companies with the earliest being the Madras Railway established in 1845 and the Great Indian Peninsular Railway incorporated in 1849. In October 1901, the Secretary of State for India in Council appointed Thomas Robertson as a special commissioner for Indian Railways to prepare a report on the administration of Indian Railways. In his report in 1903, Thomas recommended setting up of a three-member Railway Board headed by a chief commissioner. In March 1905, the railway branch of the Public Works Department was transferred to the newly established railway board under the department of commerce and industry by the Indian Railway Board Act. In 1908, the set up was re-organized on the recommendations of the Railway Finance Committee (1908) by constituting the railway board headed by a president as a separate department. Pursuant to the Acworth committee's recommendations in 1921, the railway board was expanded to four members with the addition of a financial commissioner in 1924 apart from the chief commissioner, one commissioners responsible for ways and works, projects and stores and the other responsible for general administration, staff and traffic.

In 1929, an additional member was added to the board and was assigned the responsibility for staff, so that the member in charge of traffic could focus solely on transport and commercial matters. In 1944, all the railway companies were taken over by the Government. The ministry of railways was part of the Ministry of Transport after the independence in 1947 and John Mathai served as its first minister from 1947 till 1948. On 22 September 1948, N. Gopalaswamy Ayyangar was appointed as the minister of the newly renamed Ministry of Railways and Transport. On 17 April 1957, Jagjivan Ram became the first to head the standalone Minister of Railways.

In December 1950, the Central Advisory Committee for Railways approved the plan for re-organising Indian Railways into six regional zones and re-constituting the railway board to four members with the senior-most functional member appointed the chairman of the board with no absolute over riding power. In October 1954, the chairman of the board was made responsible for decisions on technical and policy matters, with the status of a principal secretary to the Government of India with an additional member added.

The board was expanded with an additional member responsible for electrical engineering in 1972 and a further member responsible for health in 1976.

The Ministry of Railways was merged with the Ministry of Shipping and Transport and the Department of Civil Aviation on 25 September 1985 to form the Ministry of Transport and Bansi Lal, who served as the Railways Minister prior to the merger became the first holder of the new office. However, on 22 October 1986, the Ministry of Railways was again separated into an independent ministry and has been the same since then.

In 2004, the board is expanded by the introduction of two new members responsible for signalling & telecom and for stores respectively. In December 2019, the Union Cabinet decided to reduce the size of the board from eight to five.

=== Railway Budget ===
The first railway budget was presented in 1924. Since then, Railway budget was presented as a standalone budget every year before the union budget by the Railway Minister till 2016. The last Railway Budget was presented on 25 February 2016 and on 21 September 2016, Government of India approved merger of the rail and general budgets from 2017. The railway budget was estimated to be ₹264,600 crore (US$27 billion) for the financial year 2023–24.

== Organisation ==
Administrative officials
Title	Name
Minister of Railways	Ashwini Vaishnaw
Minister of State, Railways	V. Somanna, Ravneet Singh Bittu
Chairman and CEO of Railway Board	Satish Kumar

The ministry has a union minister and one or more ministers of state. The railway board reports to the union ministry with the directorates of traction, engineering, traffic, rolling stock, signalling, materials, personnel, Railway Protection Force (RPF), finance, health and safety reporting to the board. Indian Railways is a statutory body that reports to parliament and is under the ownership of ministry of railways. Indian Railways is further divided into 18 administrative zones (17 operational), headed by general managers who report to the board along with the heads of other institutions and undertakings owned by the Indian Railways. The railway board consists of a chairman, four members responsible for operations & business development, traction & rolling stock, infrastructure and finance respectively. Also part of the board are four director generals responsible for human resources, health, RPF and safety respectively.

=== Statutory Bodies/Public Sector Undertakings ===
- Rail India Technical and Economic Service
- Rail Land Development Authority
- IRCON International
- IRCON Renewable Power Limited
- Rail Vikas Nigam Limited
- Indian Railways Finance Corporation
- SIDCUL CONCOR Infra Company Ltd., a JV of SIDCUL and CONCOR
- Krishnapatnam Railway Company Limited, a JV of RVNL, Sagarmala Development Company, NMDC, Govt. of Andhra Pradesh, etc.
- Centre for Railway Information Systems
- Indian Railway Catering and Tourism Corporation Limited
- Braithwaite and Company Limited

=== Society ===
- Indian Railway Welfare Organisation

== Railway Budget ==
The first railway budget was presented in 1924. Since then, Railway budget was presented as a standalone budget every year before the union budget till 2016. The last Railway Budget was presented on 25 February 2016 and on 21 September 2016, Government of India approved merger of the rail and general budgets from 2017. The railway budget is estimated to be ₹264,600 crore (US$27 billion) for the financial year 2023–24.

== Railway ministers ==
India Minister of Railways
- Rail Mantrī
- Emblem of India

- Flag of India

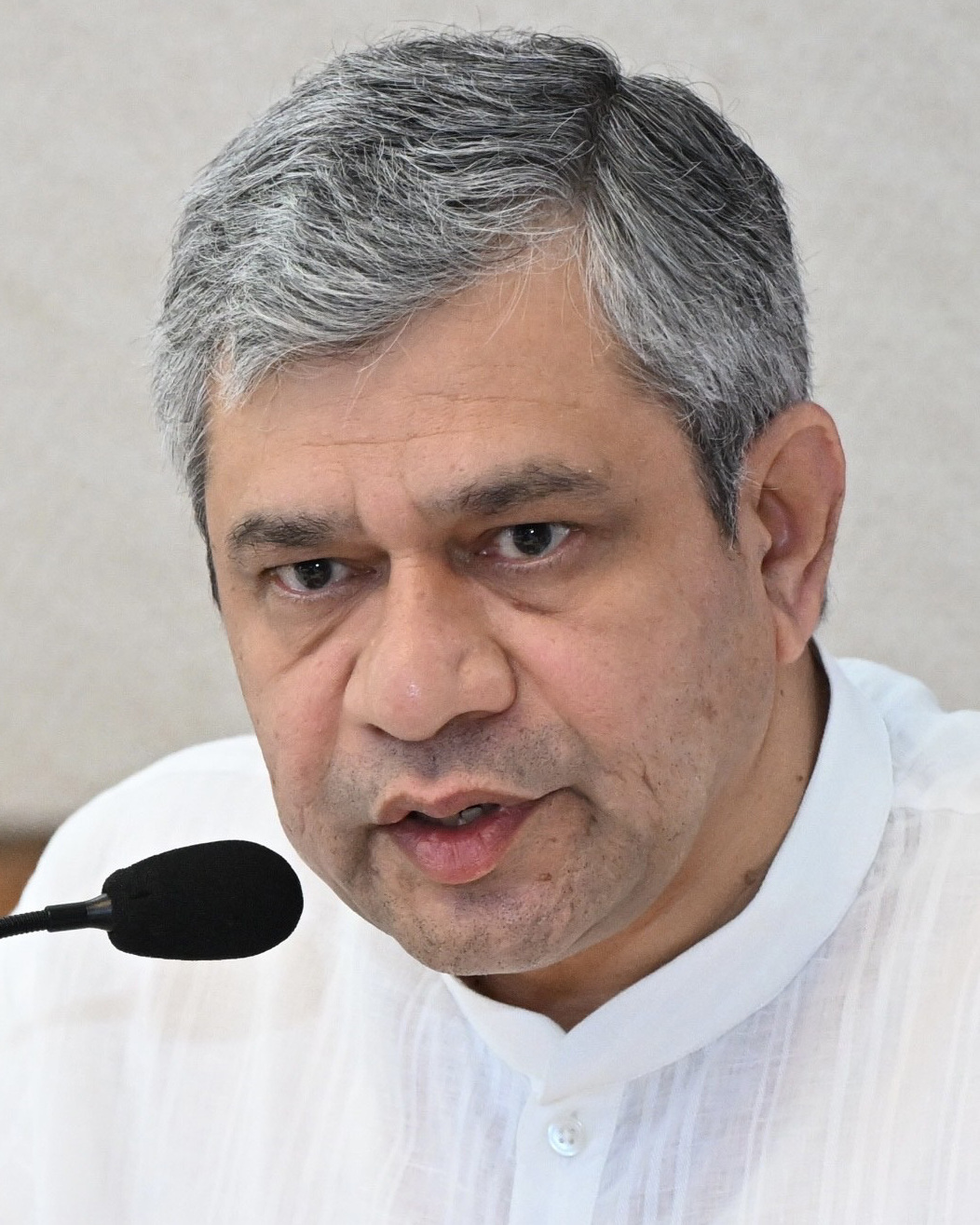
- Incumbent; Ashwini Vaishnaw since 7 July 2021
- Ministry of Railways
- Member of: Union Cabinet of India
- Reports to: President of India; Prime Minister of India; Parliament of India
- Appointer: President of India; on the recommendation of the Prime Minister
- Formation: 1947
- First holder: John Matthai (as Minister of Transport)
- Deputy: Minister of State for Railways

The Minister of Railways (Hindi: Rail Mantrī) is the head of the ministry and a member of the union council of ministers of India. The position of the Minister of Railways is usually held by a minister of cabinet rank and is often assisted by one or two junior Ministers of State.

John Mathai was the first Minister of Railways. Lal Bahadur Shastri who served as the Minister of Railways and Transport from 1952 until 1956 became the second Prime Minister of India in 1964. Four prime ministers, namely Rajiv Gandhi, P. V. Narasimha Rao, Atal Bihari Vajpayee (twice) and Manmohan Singh (twice) have briefly held the portfolio of the Minister of Railways during their premiership. Mohsina Kidwai was the first female to hold the charge of the ministry (as Minister of Surface Transport) while Mamata Banerjee is the first female to have served as the Minister of Railways. Madhavrao Scindia and Ram Naik are the only people to have served as Ministers of State for Railways with an Independent charge. Lalit Narayan Mishra is the only cabinet minister to die in office after being assassinated in a bomb blast in 1975, while Suresh Angadi is the only minister of state to die in office.

The current Minister of Railways is Ashwini Vaishnaw of the Bharatiya Janata Party who has been in office since 7 July 2021 while V. Somanna is the minister of state for railways.

=== Cabinet Ministers ===
- Key: ^{†} Assassinated or died in office
- Note: MoS, I/C – Minister of State (Independent Charge)

Indian Railway Ministers
Portrait	Minister (Birth-Death) Constituency	Term of office			Political party	Ministry	Prime Minister
Portrait	Minister (Birth-Death) Constituency	From	To	Period	Political party	Ministry	Prime Minister
Minister of Transport
	John Mathai (1886–1959)	15 August 1947	22 September 1948	1 year, 38 days	Indian National Congress	Nehru I	Jawaharlal Nehru
Minister of Transport and Railways
	N. Gopalaswamy Ayyangar (1882–1953); MP for Madras (Interim)	22 September 1948	13 May 1952	3 years, 234 days	Indian National Congress	Nehru I	Jawaharlal Nehru
	Lal Bahadur Shastri (1904–1966); Rajya Sabha MP for Uttar Pradesh	13 May 1952	7 December 1956	4 years, 208 days	Indian National Congress	Nehru II	Jawaharlal Nehru
	Jagjivan Ram (1908–1986); MP for Shahabad South	7 December 1956	17 April 1957	131 days	Indian National Congress	Nehru II	Jawaharlal Nehru
Minister of Railways
	Jagjivan Ram (1908–1986); MP for Sasaram	17 April 1957	10 April 1962	4 years, 358 days	Indian National Congress	Nehru III	Jawaharlal Nehru
	Swaran Singh (1907–1994); MP for Jullundur	10 April 1962	1 September 1963	1 year, 144 days	Indian National Congress	Nehru IV	Jawaharlal Nehru
	H. C. Dasappa (1894–1964); MP for Bangalore	1 September 1963	27 May 1964	282 days	Indian National Congress	Nehru IV	Jawaharlal Nehru
	H. C. Dasappa (1894–1964); MP for Bangalore	27 May 1964	9 June 1964	282 days	Indian National Congress	Nanda I	Gulzarilal Nanda (acting)
	S. K. Patil (1898–1981); MP for Mumbai South	9 June 1964	11 January 1966	2 years, 277 days	Indian National Congress	Shastri	Lal Bahadur Shastri
	S. K. Patil (1898–1981); MP for Mumbai South	11 January 1966	24 January 1966	2 years, 277 days	Indian National Congress	Nanda II	Gulzarilal Nanda (acting)
	S. K. Patil (1898–1981); MP for Mumbai South	24 January 1966	13 March 1967	2 years, 277 days	Indian National Congress	Indira I	Indira Gandhi
	C. M. Poonacha (1910–1990); MP for Mangalore	13 March 1967	14 February 1969	1 year, 338 days	Indian National Congress	Indira II	Indira Gandhi
	Ram Subhag Singh (1917–1980); MP for Buxar	14 February 1969	4 November 1969	263 days	Indian National Congress	Indira II	Indira Gandhi
	Panampilly Govinda Menon (1906–1970); MP for Mukundapuram	4 November 1969	18 February 1970	106 days	Indian National Congress (R)	Indira II	Indira Gandhi
	Gulzarilal Nanda (1898–1998); MP for Kurukshetra	18 February 1970	18 March 1971	1 year, 28 days	Indian National Congress (R)	Indira II	Indira Gandhi
	Kengal Hanumanthaiah (1908–1980); MP for Bangalore City	18 March 1971	22 July 1972	1 year, 126 days	Indian National Congress (R)	Indira III	Indira Gandhi
	T. A. Pai (1922–1981); Rajya Sabha MP for Karnataka	22 July 1972	5 February 1973	198 days	Indian National Congress (R)	Indira III	Indira Gandhi
	Lalit Narayan Mishra (1923–1975); MP for Darbhanga	5 February 1973	3 January 1975^{[†]}	1 year, 332 days	Indian National Congress (R)	Indira III	Indira Gandhi
	Kamalapati Tripathi (1905–1990); Rajya Sabha MP for Uttar Pradesh	10 February 1975	23 March 1977	2 years, 41 days	Indian National Congress (R)	Indira III	Indira Gandhi
	Madhu Dandavate (1924–2005); MP for Rajapur	26 March 1977	28 July 1979	2 years, 124 days	Janata Party	Desai	Morarji Desai
	T. A. Pai (1922–1981); MP for Udipi	28 July 1979	14 January 1980	170 days	Janata Party (Secular)	Charan Singh	Charan Singh
	Kamalapati Tripathi (1905–1990); MP for Varanasi	14 January 1980	12 November 1980	303 days	Indian National Congress (I)	Indira IV	Indira Gandhi
	Kedar Pandey (1920–1982); MP for Bettiah	12 November 1980	15 January 1982	1 year, 64 days	Indian National Congress (I)	Indira IV	Indira Gandhi
	Prakash Chandra Sethi (1919–1996); MP for Indore	15 January 1982	2 September 1982	230 days	Indian National Congress (I)	Indira IV	Indira Gandhi
	A. B. A. Ghani Khan Choudhury (1927–2006); MP for Malda	2 September 1982	31 October 1984	2 years, 59 days	Indian National Congress (I)	Indira IV	Indira Gandhi
	A. B. A. Ghani Khan Choudhury (1927–2006); MP for Malda	4 November 1984	31 December 1984	57 days	Indian National Congress (I)	Rajiv I	Rajiv Gandhi
	Bansi Lal (1927–2006); MP for Bhiwani	31 December 1984	25 September 1985	268 days	Indian National Congress (I)	Rajiv II	Rajiv Gandhi
Minister of Transport
	Bansi Lal (1927–2006); MP for Bhiwani	25 September 1985	4 June 1986	252 days	Indian National Congress (I)	Rajiv II	Rajiv Gandhi
	Rajiv Gandhi (1944–1991); MP for Amethi (Prime Minister)	4 June 1986	24 June 1986	20 days	Indian National Congress (I)	Rajiv II	Rajiv Gandhi
	Mohsina Kidwai (born 1932); MP for Meerut	24 June 1986	22 October 1986	120 days	Indian National Congress (I)	Rajiv II	Rajiv Gandhi
Minister of Railways
	Madhavrao Scindia (1945–2001); MP for Gwalior (MoS, I/C)	22 October 1986	2 December 1989	3 years, 41 days	Indian National Congress (I)	Rajiv II	Rajiv Gandhi
	George Fernandes (1930–2019); MP for Muzaffarpur	6 December 1989	10 November 1990	339 days	Janata Dal	V. P. Singh	V. P. Singh
	Janeshwar Mishra (1933–2010); MP for Allahabad	21 November 1990	21 June 1991	212 days	Samajwadi Janata Party (Rashtriya)	Chandra Shekhar	Chandra Shekhar
	C. K. Jaffer Sharief (1933–2018); MP for Bangalore North	21 June 1991	17 August 1995	4 years, 57 days	Indian National Congress (I)	Rao	P. V. Narasimha Rao
	P. V. Narasimha Rao (1921–2004); MP for Nandyal (Prime Minister)	18 August 1995	16 May 1996	272 days	Indian National Congress (I)	Rao	P. V. Narasimha Rao
	Atal Bihari Vajpayee (1924–2018); MP for Lucknow (Prime Minister)	16 May 1996	1 June 1996	16 days	Bharatiya Janata Party	Vajpayee I	Self
	Ram Vilas Paswan (1946–2020); MP for Hajipur	1 June 1996	21 April 1997	1 year, 291 days	Janata Dal	Deve Gowda	H. D. Deve Gowda
	Ram Vilas Paswan (1946–2020); MP for Hajipur	21 April 1997	19 March 1998	1 year, 291 days	Janata Dal	Gujral	Inder Kumar Gujral
	Nitish Kumar (born 1951); MP for Barh	19 March 1998	5 August 1999	1 year, 139 days	Samata Party	Vajpayee II	Atal Bihari Vajpayee
	Ram Naik (born 1934); MP for Mumbai North (MoS, I/C)	6 August 1999	13 October 1999	161 days	Bharatiya Janata Party	Vajpayee II	Atal Bihari Vajpayee
	Mamata Banerjee (born 1955); MP for Calcutta South	13 October 1999	16 March 2001	1 year, 154 days	Trinamool Congress	Vajpayee III	Atal Bihari Vajpayee
	Atal Bihari Vajpayee (1924–2018); MP for Lucknow (Prime Minister)	16 March 2001	20 March 2001	16 days	Bharatiya Janata Party	Vajpayee III	Atal Bihari Vajpayee
	Nitish Kumar (born 1951); MP for Barh	20 March 2001	22 May 2004	3 years, 63 days	Janata Dal (United)	Vajpayee III	Atal Bihari Vajpayee
	Lalu Prasad Yadav (born 1948); MP for Chapra	23 May 2004	22 May 2009	4 years, 364 days	Rashtriya Janata Dal	Manmohan I	Manmohan Singh
	Mamata Banerjee (born 1955); MP for Kolkata Dakshin	23 May 2009	19 May 2011	1 year, 361 days	Trinamool Congress	Manmohan II	Manmohan Singh
	Manmohan Singh (1932–2024); Rajya Sabha MP for Assam (Prime Minister)	19 May 2011	12 July 2011	54 days	Indian National Congress	Manmohan II	Manmohan Singh
	Dinesh Trivedi (born 1950); MP for Barrackpore	12 July 2011	19 March 2012	251 days	Trinamool Congress	Manmohan II	Manmohan Singh
	Mukul Roy (1954–2026); Rajya Sabha MP for West Bengal	20 March 2012	22 September 2012	186 days	Trinamool Congress	Manmohan II	Manmohan Singh
	C. P. Joshi (born 1950); MP for Bhilwara	22 September 2012	28 October 2012	36 days	Indian National Congress	Manmohan II	Manmohan Singh
	Pawan Kumar Bansal (born 1948); MP for Chandigarh	28 October 2012	11 May 2013	195 days	Indian National Congress	Manmohan II	Manmohan Singh
	C. P. Joshi (born 1950); MP for Bhilwara	11 May 2013	15 June 2013	35 days	Indian National Congress	Manmohan II	Manmohan Singh
	Manmohan Singh (1932–2024); Rajya Sabha MP for Assam (Prime Minister)	15 June 2013	17 June 2013	2 days	Indian National Congress	Manmohan II	Manmohan Singh
	Mallikarjun Kharge (born 1942); MP for Gulbarga	17 June 2013	26 May 2014	343 days	Indian National Congress	Manmohan II	Manmohan Singh
	D. V. Sadananda Gowda (born 1953); MP for Bangalore North	27 May 2014	9 November 2014	166 days	Bharatiya Janata Party	Modi I	Narendra Modi
	Suresh Prabhu (born 1953); Rajya Sabha MP for Haryana, till 2016; Rajya Sabha MP for Andhra Pradesh, from 2016	9 November 2014	3 September 2017	2 years, 298 days	Bharatiya Janata Party	Modi I	Narendra Modi
	Piyush Goyal (born 1964); Rajya Sabha MP for Maharashtra	3 September 2017	30 May 2019	3 years, 307 days	Bharatiya Janata Party	Modi I	Narendra Modi
	Piyush Goyal (born 1964); Rajya Sabha MP for Maharashtra	31 May 2019	7 July 2021	3 years, 307 days	Bharatiya Janata Party	Modi II	Narendra Modi
	Ashwini Vaishnaw (born 1970); Rajya Sabha MP for Odisha	7 July 2021	9 June 2024	5 years, 126 days	Bharatiya Janata Party	Modi II	Narendra Modi
	Ashwini Vaishnaw (born 1970); Rajya Sabha MP for Odisha	10 June 2024	Incumbent	5 years, 126 days	Bharatiya Janata Party	Modi III	Narendra Modi

=== Ministers of State ===
- Key: ^{†} Assassinated or died in office

Ministers of State
Portrait	Minister (Birth-Death) Constituency	Term of office			Political party	Ministry	Prime Minister
Portrait	Minister (Birth-Death) Constituency	From	To	Period	Political party	Ministry	Prime Minister
Minister of State for Transport and Railways
	K. Santhanam (1895–1980); MP for Madras (Constituent Assembly)	1 October 1948	29 May 1952	3 years, 241 days	Indian National Congress	Nehru I	Jawaharlal Nehru
Minister of State for Railways
	Ram Subhag Singh (1917–1980); MP for Bikramganj	13 May 1964	27 May 1964	2 years, 304 days	Indian National Congress	Nehru IV	Jawaharlal Nehru
	Ram Subhag Singh (1917–1980); MP for Bikramganj	27 May 1964	9 June 1964	2 years, 304 days	Indian National Congress	Nanda I	Gulzarilal Nanda (acting)
	Ram Subhag Singh (1917–1980); MP for Bikramganj	9 June 1964	11 January 1966	2 years, 304 days	Indian National Congress	Shastri	Lal Bahadur Shastri
	Ram Subhag Singh (1917–1980); MP for Bikramganj	11 January 1966	24 January 1966	2 years, 304 days	Indian National Congress	Nanda II	Gulzarilal Nanda (acting)
	Ram Subhag Singh (1917–1980); MP for Bikramganj	24 January 1966	13 March 1967	2 years, 304 days	Indian National Congress	Indira I	Indira Gandhi
	Parimal Ghosh (1917–1985); MP for Ghatal	13 March 1967	17 October 1969	2 years, 218 days	Indian National Congress	Indira II	Indira Gandhi
	Mohammad Shafi Qureshi (1928–2016); MP for Anantnag	10 October 1974	23 March 1977	2 years, 164 days	Indian National Congress (R)	Indira III	Indira Gandhi
	Surendra Pal Singh (1917–2009); MP for Bulandshahr	23 December 1976	24 March 1977	91 days	Indian National Congress (R)	Indira III	Indira Gandhi
	Sheo Narain (1913–1987); MP for Basti	14 August 1977	28 July 1979	1 year, 348 days	Janata Party	Desai	Morarji Desai
	C. K. Jaffer Sharief (1933–2018); MP for Bangalore North	14 January 1980	31 October 1984	4 years, 291 days	Indian National Congress (I)	Indira IV	Indira Gandhi
	Madhavrao Scindia (1945–2001); MP for Gwalior	31 December 1984	25 September 1985	268 days	Indian National Congress (I)	Rajiv II	Rajiv Gandhi
Minister of State for Transport – Department of Railways
	Madhavrao Scindia (1945–2001); MP for Gwalior	25 September 1985	22 October 1986	1 year, 27 days	Indian National Congress (I)	Rajiv II	Rajiv Gandhi
Minister of State for Railways
	Bhakta Charan Das (born 1958); MP for Kalahandi	21 November 1990	21 June 1991	212 days	Samajwadi Janata Party (Rashtriya)	Chandra Shekhar	Chandra Shekhar
	Mallikarjun Goud (1941–2002); MP for Mahabubnagar	21 June 1991	18 January 1993	1 year, 211 days	Indian National Congress (I)	Rao	P. V. Narasimha Rao
	Kahnu Charan Lenka (born 1939); Rajya Sabha MP for Odisha	18 January 1993	2 April 1994	1 year, 74 days	Indian National Congress (I)	Rao	P. V. Narasimha Rao
	Mallikarjun Goud (1941–2002); MP for Mahabubnagar	21 August 1995	19 September 1995	29 days	Indian National Congress (I)	Rao	P. V. Narasimha Rao
	Suresh Kalmadi (1944–2026); Rajya Sabha MP for Maharashtra	15 September 1995	16 May 1996	244 days	Indian National Congress (I)	Rao	P. V. Narasimha Rao
	Satpal Maharaj (born 1951); MP for Garhwal	6 July 1996	21 April 1997	338 days	All India Indira Congress (Tiwari)	Deve Gowda	H. D. Deve Gowda
	Satpal Maharaj (born 1951); MP for Garhwal	21 April 1997	9 June 1997	338 days	All India Indira Congress (Tiwari)	Gujral	Inder Kumar Gujral
	Ram Naik (born 1934); MP for Mumbai North	19 March 1998	6 August 1999	1 year, 140 days	Bharatiya Janata Party	Vajpayee II	Atal Bihari Vajpayee
	Digvijay Singh (1955–2010); MP for Banka	13 October 1999	22 July 2001	1 year, 282 days	Samata Party	Vajpayee III	Atal Bihari Vajpayee
	Bangaru Laxman (1939–2014); Rajya Sabha MP for Gujarat	22 November 1999	31 August 2000	283 days	Bharatiya Janata Party	Vajpayee III	Atal Bihari Vajpayee
	O. Rajagopal (born 1929); Rajya Sabha MP for Madhya Pradesh	31 August 2000	1 July 2002	1 year, 304 days	Bharatiya Janata Party	Vajpayee III	Atal Bihari Vajpayee
	Digvijay Singh (1955–2010); MP for Banka	1 August 2001	1 July 2002	334 days	Samata Party	Vajpayee III	Atal Bihari Vajpayee
	A. K. Moorthy (born 1964); MP for Chengalpattu	1 July 2002	15 January 2004	1 year, 198 days	Pattali Makkal Katchi	Vajpayee III	Atal Bihari Vajpayee
	Bandaru Dattatreya (born 1947); MP for Secunderabad	1 July 2002	8 September 2003	1 year, 69 days	Bharatiya Janata Party	Vajpayee III	Atal Bihari Vajpayee
	Basangouda Patil Yatnal (born 1963); MP for Bijapur	8 September 2003	22 May 2004	257 days	Bharatiya Janata Party	Vajpayee III	Atal Bihari Vajpayee
	Naranbhai Rathwa (born 1953); MP for Chhota Udaipur	23 May 2004	22 May 2009	4 years, 364 days	Indian National Congress	Manmohan I	Manmohan Singh
	R. Velu (born 1940); MP for Arakkonam	23 May 2004	29 March 2009	4 years, 310 days	Pattali Makkal Katchi	Manmohan I	Manmohan Singh
	E. Ahamed (1938–2017); MP for Malappuram	28 May 2009	19 January 2011	1 year, 236 days	Indian Union Muslim League	Manmohan II	Manmohan Singh
	K. H. Muniyappa (born 1948); MP for Kolar	28 May 2009	28 October 2012	3 years, 153 days	Indian National Congress	Manmohan II	Manmohan Singh
	Bharatsinh Solanki (born 1953); MP for Anand	19 January 2011	28 October 2012	1 year, 283 days	Indian National Congress	Manmohan II	Manmohan Singh
	Mukul Roy (1954–2026); Rajya Sabha MP for West Bengal	19 May 2011	12 July 2011	54 days	Trinamool Congress	Manmohan II	Manmohan Singh
	Kotla Jayasurya Prakasha Reddy (born 1951); MP for Kurnool	28 October 2012	26 May 2014	1 year, 210 days	Indian National Congress	Manmohan II	Manmohan Singh
	Adhir Ranjan Chowdhury (born 1956); MP for Baharampur	28 October 2012	26 May 2014	1 year, 210 days	Indian National Congress	Manmohan II	Manmohan Singh
	Manoj Sinha (born 1959); MP for Ghazipur	27 May 2014	30 May 2019	5 years, 3 days	Bharatiya Janata Party	Modi I	Narendra Modi
	Rajen Gohain (born 1950); MP for Nowgong	5 July 2016	30 May 2019	2 years, 329 days	Bharatiya Janata Party	Modi I	Narendra Modi
	Suresh Angadi (1955–2020); MP for Belgaum	31 May 2019	23 September 2020^{[†]}	1 year, 115 days	Bharatiya Janata Party	Modi II	Narendra Modi
	Raosaheb Danve (born 1955); MP for Jalna	7 July 2021	9 June 2024	2 years, 338 days	Bharatiya Janata Party	Modi II	Narendra Modi
	Darshana Jardosh (born 1961); MP for Surat	7 July 2021	9 June 2024	2 years, 338 days	Bharatiya Janata Party	Modi II	Narendra Modi
	V. Somanna (born 1950); MP for Tumkur	10 June 2024	Incumbent	2 years, 153 days	Bharatiya Janata Party	Modi III	Narendra Modi
	Ravneet Singh Bittu (born 1975); Rajya Sabha MP for Rajasthan (Until 21 June 2026)	10 June 2024	24 July 2026	2 years, 44 days	Bharatiya Janata Party	Modi III	Narendra Modi

=== Deputy Ministers ===
No.	Portrait	Minister (Birth-Death) Constituency	Term of office			Political party	Ministry	Prime Minister
No.	Portrait	Minister (Birth-Death) Constituency	From	To	Period	Political party	Ministry	Prime Minister
Deputy Minister for Transport and Railways
1		B. V. Keskar (1903–1984); MP for Madras (Constituent Assembly)	10 March 1952	13 May 1952	64 days	Indian National Congress	Nehru I	Jawaharlal Nehru
2		O. V. Alagesan (1911–1992); MP for Chengalpattu	12 August 1952	16 April 1957	4 years, 247 days	Indian National Congress	Nehru II	Jawaharlal Nehru
3		Shah Nawaz Khan (1914–1993); MP for Meerut	20 September 1956	17 April 1957	209 days	Indian National Congress	Nehru II	Jawaharlal Nehru
Deputy Minister for Railways
(3)		Shah Nawaz Khan (1914–1993); MP for Meerut	17 April 1957	10 April 1962	4 years, 358 days	Indian National Congress	Nehru III	Jawaharlal Nehru
4		S. V. Ramaswamy; MP for Salem	2 April 1958	10 April 1962	4 years, 8 days	Indian National Congress	Nehru III	Jawaharlal Nehru
(3)		Shah Nawaz Khan (1914–1993); MP for Meerut	16 April 1962	27 May 1964	2 years, 41 days	Indian National Congress	Nehru III	Jawaharlal Nehru
(4)		S. V. Ramaswamy; MP for Salem	16 April 1962	27 May 1964	2 years, 41 days	Indian National Congress	Nehru III	Jawaharlal Nehru
(3)		Shah Nawaz Khan (1914–1993); MP for Meerut	27 May 1964	9 June 1964	13 days	Indian National Congress	Nanda I	Gulzarilal Nanda (acting)
(4)		S. V. Ramaswamy; MP for Salem	27 May 1964	9 June 1964	13 days	Indian National Congress	Nanda I	Gulzarilal Nanda (acting)
5		Sham Nath; MP for Chandni Chowk	15 June 1964	11 January 1966	2 years, 271 days	Indian National Congress	Shastri	Lal Bahadur Shastri
5		Sham Nath; MP for Chandni Chowk	11 January 1966	24 January 1966	2 years, 271 days	Indian National Congress	Nanda II	Gulzarilal Nanda (acting)
5		Sham Nath; MP for Chandni Chowk	24 January 1966	13 March 1967	2 years, 271 days	Indian National Congress	Indira I	Indira Gandhi
6		S. C. Jamir (born 1931); MP for Nagaland	13 March 1967	14 November 1967	246 days	Indian National Congress	Indira II	Indira Gandhi
7		Rohanlal Chaturvedi (1919–?); MP for Etah	14 November 1967	18 March 1971	3 years, 124 days	Indian National Congress	Indira II	Indira Gandhi
8		Mohammad Yunus Saleem (1912–2004); MP for Nalgonda	27 June 1970	18 March 1971	264 days	Indian National Congress (R)	Indira II	Indira Gandhi
9		Mohammad Shafi Qureshi (1928–2016); Anantnag	2 May 1971	10 October 1974	3 years, 161 days	Indian National Congress (R)	Indira III	Indira Gandhi
10		Buta Singh (1934–2021); MP for Ropar	10 October 1974	23 December 1976	2 years, 74 days	Indian National Congress (R)	Indira III	Indira Gandhi
Deputy Minister for Railways
11		Mahaveer Prasad (1939–2010); MP for Bansgaon	14 February 1988	4 July 1989	1 year, 140 days	Indian National Congress (I)	Rajiv II	Rajiv Gandhi
12		Ajay Singh (1950–2020); MP for Agra	23 April 1990	10 November 1990	201 days	Janata Dal	Vishwanath	V. P. Singh
Position not in use since 10 November 1990

== Length of Tenure ==
=== Cabinet Ministers ===
#	Name of Minister	Party	Terms	Length of term	
#	Name of Minister	Party	Terms	Longest tenure	Total tenure
1	Jagjivan Ram	INC	2	4 years, 358 days	5 years, 124 days
2	Lalu Prasad Yadav	RJD	1	4 years, 364 days	4 years, 364 days
3	Ashwini Vaishnaw	BJP	2	2 years, 337 days	5 years, 126 days
4	Lal Bahadur Shastri	INC	1	4 years, 208 days	4 years, 208 days
5	Nitish Kumar	SAP/JD(U)	2	3 years, 63 days	4 years, 202 days
6	C. K. Jaffer Sharief	INC(I)	1	4 years, 57 days	4 years, 57 days
7	Piyush Goyal	BJP	2	2 years, 37 days	3 years, 306 days
8	N. Gopalaswamy Ayyangar	INC	1	3 years, 233 days	3 years, 233 days
9	Mamata Banerjee	AITC	2	1 years, 361 days	3 years, 151 days
10	Madhavrao Scindia	INC(I)	1	3 years, 41 days	3 years, 41 days
11	Kamalapati Tripathi	INC(I)/INC(R)	2	2 years, 41 days	2 years, 344 days
12	Suresh Prabhu	BJP	1	2 years, 298 days	2 years, 298 days
13	S. K. Patil	INC	3	1 years, 216 days	2 years, 277 days
14	Madhu Dandavate	JP	1	2 years, 124 days	2 years, 124 days
15	A. B. A. Ghani Khan Choudhury	INC(I)	2	2 years, 59 days	2 years, 116 days
16	C. M. Poonacha	INC	1	1 years, 338 days	1 years, 338 days
17	Lalit Narayan Mishra	INC(R)	1	1 years, 332 days	1 years, 332 days
18	Ram Vilas Paswan	JD	2	0 years, 332 days	1 year, 291 days
19	Swaran Singh	INC	1	1 years, 144 days	1 years, 144 days
20	Bansi Lal	INC(I)	2	0 years, 268 days	1 year, 155 days
21	Kengal Hanumanthaiah	INC(R)	1	1 years, 126 days	1 years, 126 days
22	Kedar Pandey	INC(I)	1	1 years, 64 days	1 years, 64 days
23	John Mathai	INC	1	1 years, 38 days	1 years, 38 days
24	Gulzarilal Nanda	INC(R)	1	1 years, 28 days	1 years, 28 days
25	T. A. Pai	INC(R)/JP(S)	2	0 years, 198 days	1 year, 3 days
26	Mallikarjun Kharge	INC	1	0 years, 343 days	0 years, 343 days
27	George Fernandes	JD	1	0 years, 339 days	0 years, 339 days
28	H. C. Dasappa	INC	2	0 years, 269 days	0 years, 282 days
29	P. V. Narasimha Rao	INC(I)	1	0 years, 272 days	0 years, 272 days
30	Ram Subhag Singh	INC	1	0 years, 263 days	0 years, 263 days
31	Dinesh Trivedi	AITC	1	0 years, 251 days	0 years, 251 days
32	Prakash Chandra Sethi	INC(I)	1	0 years, 230 days	0 years, 230 days
33	Janeshwar Mishra	SJP(R)	1	0 years, 212 days	0 years, 212 days
34	Pawan Kumar Bansal	INC	1	0 years, 195 days	0 years, 195 days
35	Mukul Roy	AITC	1	0 years, 186 days	0 years, 186 days
36	D. V. Sadananda Gowda	BJP	1	0 years, 166 days	0 years, 166 days
37	Mohsina Kidwai	INC(I)	1	0 years, 120 days	0 years, 120 days
38	Panampilly Govinda Menon	INC(R)	1	0 years, 106 days	0 years, 106 days
39	C. P. Joshi	INC	2	0 years, 36 days	0 years, 71 days
40	Ram Naik	BJP	1	0 years, 68 days	0 years, 68 days
41	Manmohan Singh	INC	2	0 years, 54 days	0 years, 56 days
42	Atal Bihari Vajpayee	BJP	2	0 years, 16 days	0 years, 20 days
43	Rajiv Gandhi	INC(I)	1	0 years, 20 days	0 years, 20 days

== Criticism and controversies ==
On 14 February 2008, Westinghouse Air Brake, admitted to a US federal court of violating Foreign Corrupt Practices Act (FCPA) regulations by making improper payments from its subsidiary Pioneer Friction based in Kolkata, to government officials of the Indian railway board to obtain and retain business with the Railway Board and curb taxes.

On 3 May 2013, the CBI arrested then minister of railways Pawan Kumar Bansal's nephew, Vijay Singla for accepting an alleged bribe of ₹9 million (US$93,000) from a middleman for the appointment of a particular person to the railway board. The railway board clarified that no rules had been broken during the appointment and suspended Mahesh, the person concerned.
