= List of members of the 3rd Lok Sabha =

Members of Lok Sabha (1962-67)

This is a list of members of the 3rd Lok Sabha arranged by state or territory represented. These members of the lower house of the Indian Parliament were elected to the 3rd Lok Sabha at the 1962 Indian general election.

The official list of members, hosted on a site maintained by Government of India : https://www.elections.in/parliamentary-constituencies/1962-election-results.html

== Andhra Pradesh ==
INC (34) CPI (7) SWA (1) IND (1)

No.	Constituency	Member	Party
1	Adilabad	G. Narayan Reddy	Indian National Congress
2	Adoni	Pendekanti Venkatasubbaiah	Indian National Congress
3	Amalapuram (SC)	Bayya Suryanarayana Murthy	Indian National Congress
4	Anakapalli	Missula Suryanarayana Murti	Indian National Congress
5	Anantapur	Osman Ali S. Khan	Indian National Congress
6	Cheepurupalli	Ravu Venkata Gopalakrishna Ranga Rao	Indian National Congress
7	Chittoor	M. A. Ayyangar	Indian National Congress
8	Cuddapah	Yeddula Eswara Reddy	Communist Party of India
9	Eluru	Viramachaneni Vimla Devi	Communist Party of India
10	Gadwal	Janumpally Rameshwar Rao	Indian National Congress
11	Gudivada	Maganti Ankineedu	Indian National Congress
12	Guntur	Kotha Raghuramaiah	Indian National Congress
13	Hindupur	K. V. Ramakrishna Reddy	Indian National Congress
14	Hyderabad	Dr. Gopal S. Melkote	Indian National Congress
15	Kakinada	Mosalikanti Thirumala Rao	Indian National Congress
16	Karimnagar	Juvvadi Ramapathy Rao	Indian National Congress
17	Kavali	Bezawada Gopala Reddy	Indian National Congress
18	Khammam	T. Lakshmi Kantamma	Indian National Congress
19	Kurnool	Yasoda Reddy	Indian National Congress
20	Mahabubabad	Etikala Madhusudan Rao	Indian National Congress
21	Mahbubnagar (SC)	J.B. Muthyal Rao	Indian National Congress
22	Markapur	Gujjulu Yallamanda Reddy	Communist Party of India
23	Masulipatnam	Mandala Venkata Swamy Naidu	Independent
24	Medak	P. Hanmanth Rao	Indian National Congress
25	Miryalguda (SC)	Laxmi Das	Communist Party of India
26	Nalgonda	Ravi Narayana Reddy	Communist Party of India
27	Narasapur	Dalta Balaramaraju	Indian National Congress
28	Narasipatnam (ST)	Matcharasa Matcharaju	Indian National Congress
29	Nellore (SC)	B. Anjanappa	Indian National Congress
30	Nizamabad	Harish Chandra Heda	Indian National Congress
31	Ongole	Madala Narayana Swamy	Communist Party of India
32	Padapalli (SC)	M. R. Krishna	Indian National Congress
33	Parvathipuram (ST)	Biddika Satyanarayana	Indian National Congress
34	Rajahmundry (ST)	Dr. Datla Satyanarayana Raju	Indian National Congress
35	Rajampet	C. L. Narasimha Reddy	Swatantra Party
36	Secunderabad	Ahmed Mohiuddin	Indian National Congress
37	Srikakulam	Boddepalli Rajagopala Rao	Indian National Congress
38	Tenali	Kolla Venkaiah	Communist Party of India
39	Tirupathi (SC)	C. Dass	Indian National Congress
40	Vicarabad	Sangam Laxmi Bai	Indian National Congress
41	Vijayawada	Dr. K.L. Rao	Indian National Congress
42	Visakhapatnam	Vijaya Ananda Gajapathi Raju	Indian National Congress
43	Warangal	Bakar Ali Mirza	Indian National Congress

== Assam ==
INC (9) PSP (2) HLC (1)

No.	Constituency	Member	Party
1	Autonomous Districts (ST)	George Gilbert Swell	Hill Leaders Conference
2	Barpeta	Renuka Devi Barkataki	Indian National Congress
3	Cachar	Jyotsna Chanda	Indian National Congress
4	Darrang	Bijoy Chandra Bhagavati	Indian National Congress
5	Dhubri	Ghyasuddin Ahmad	Indian National Congress
6	Dibrugarh	Jogendra Nath Hazarika	Indian National Congress
7	Gauhati	Hem Borua	Praja Socialist Party
8	Goalpara (ST)	Dharanidhor Basumatari	Indian National Congress
9	Jorhat	Rajendranath Barua	Praja Socialist Party
10	Karimganj (SC)	Nihar Ranjan Laskar	Indian National Congress
11	Nowgong	Liladhar Kotoki	Indian National Congress
12	Sibsagar	Prafulla Chandra Borooah	Indian National Congress

== Bihar ==
INC (39) SWA (7) JP (3) PSP (2) SP (1) CPI (1)

No.	Constituency	Member	Party
1	Aurangabad	Lalita Rajya Laxmi	Swatantra Party
2	Bagaha	Kamal Nath Tewari	Indian National Congress
3	Banka	Shakuntala Devi	Indian National Congress
4	Barh	Tarkeshwari Sinha	Indian National Congress
5	Begusarai	Mathura Prasad Mishra	Indian National Congress
6	Bettiah (SC)	Bhola Raut	Indian National Congress
7	Bhagalpur	Bhagwat Jha Azad	Indian National Congress
8	Bikramganj	Dr. Ram Subhag Singh	Indian National Congress
9	Buxar	Anant Prasad Sharma	Indian National Congress
10	Chapra	Ramshekhar Prasad Singh	Indian National Congress
11	Chatra	Vijaya Raje	Swatantra Party
12	Darbhanga	Shree Narayan Das	Indian National Congress
13	Dhanbad	P.R. Chakravarti	Indian National Congress
14	Dumka (ST)	Satya Chandra Besra	Indian National Congress
15	Gaya	Brajeshwar Prasad	Indian National Congress
16	Giridih	Thakur Bateshwar Singh	Swatantra Party
17	Godda	Prabhu Dayal Himatsingka	Indian National Congress
18	Gopalganj	Dwarka Nath Tiwary	Indian National Congress
19	Hajipur	Rajeshwara Patel	Indian National Congress
20	Hazaribagh	Dr. Basant Narain Singh	Swatantra Party
21	Jahanabad	Satyabhama Devi	Indian National Congress
22	Jainagar	Yamuna Prasad Mandal	Indian National Congress
23	Jamshedpur	Dr. Udaikar Misra	Communist Party of India
24	Jamui (SC)	Narayan Das	Indian National Congress
25	Katihar	Priya Gupta	Praja Socialist Party
26	Kesaria	Bhishma Prasad Yadav	Indian National Congress
27	Khagaria	Jiyalal Mandal	Indian National Congress
28	Kishanganj	Mohammad Tahir	Indian National Congress
29	Lohardaga (ST)	David Munzni	Swatantra Party
30	Madhubani	Yogendra Jha	Praja Socialist Party
31	Maharajganj	Krishna Kanta Singh	Indian National Congress
32	Mahua (SC)	Dr. Chandra Mani Lal Chawdhary	Indian National Congress
33	Monghyr	Banarsi Prasad Sinha	Indian National Congress
33	Monghyr	Madhu Limaye (1964 bypoll)	Socialist Party
34	Motihari	Bibhuti Mishra	Indian National Congress
35	Muzaffarpur	Digvijay Narain Singh	Indian National Congress
36	Nalanda	Prof. Siddheshwar Prasad	Indian National Congress
37	Nawada (SC)	Ram Dhani Das	Indian National Congress
38	Palamau (SC)	Shashank Manjari	Swatantra Party
39	Patna	Ramdulari Devi	Indian National Congress
40	Pupri	Shashi Ranjan Prasad Sah	Indian National Congress
41	Purnea	Phani Gopal Sen Gupta	Indian National Congress
42	Rajmahal (ST)	Iswar Marandi	Jharkhand Party
43	Ranchi (East)	Prashant Kumar Ghosh	Swatantra Party
44	Ranchi (West) (ST)	Jaipal Singh	Jharkhand Party
45	Rosera (SC)	Rameshwar Sahu	Indian National Congress
46	Saharsa	Bhupendra Narayan Mandal	Socialist Party
46	Saharsa	Lahtan Choudhary (1964 bypoll)	Indian National Congress
47	Samastipur	Satya Narayan Sinha	Indian National Congress
48	Sasaram (SC)	Jagjivan Ram	Indian National Congress
49	Shahabad	Bali Ram Bhagat	Indian National Congress
50	Singhbhum (ST)	Hari Charan Soy	Jharkhand Party
51	Sitamarhi	Nagendra Prasad Yadav	Indian National Congress
52	Siwan	Mohammad Yusuf	Indian National Congress
53	Sonbarsa (SC)	Tulmohan Ram	Indian National Congress

== Delhi ==
INC (5)

No.	Constituency	Member	Party
1	Chandni Chowk	Sham Nath	Indian National Congress
2	Delhi Sadar	Shiv Charan Gupta	Indian National Congress
3	Karol Bagh (SC)	Naval Prabhakar	Indian National Congress
4	New Delhi	Mehr Chand Khanna	Indian National Congress
5	Outer Delhi	Chowdhury Brahm Prakash	Indian National Congress

== Goa, Daman and Diu ==
MGP (1) PSP (1)

No.	Constituency	Member	Party
1	Mormugao	Shinkre M. Padmanaba	Maharashtrawadi Gomantak Party
2	Panjim	Peter Augustus Alvares	Praja Socialist Party

== Gujarat ==
INC (16) SWA (4) PSP (1) NJP (1)

No.	Constituency	Member	Party
1	Ahmedabad	Indulal Kanaiyalal Yagnik	Nutan Mahagujarat Janata Parishad
2	Amreli	Jayaben Shah	Indian National Congress
3	Anand	Narendrasingh Ranjitsingh Mahida	Swatantra Party
4	Banaskantha	Zohraben Akbarbhai Chavda	Indian National Congress
5	Baroda	Fatesinghrao Pratapsinghrao Gaekwad	Indian National Congress
6	Bhavnagar	Jashvant Mehta	Praja Socialist Party
7	Broach	Chhotubhai Makanbhai Patel	Indian National Congress
8	Bulsar (ST)	Nanubhai Nichhabhai Patel	Indian National Congress
9	Dohad (SC)	Hirabhai Kunverbhai Baria	Swatantra Party
10	Jamnagar	Manubhai Mansukhlal Shah	Indian National Congress
11	Junagadh	Chitranjan Rughunath Raja	Indian National Congress
12	Kaira	Pravinsinh Natavarsinh Solanki	Swatantra Party
13	Kutch	Himmatsinhji M. K.	Swatantra Party
14	Mandvi (ST)	Chhaganbhai Madaribhai Kedaria	Indian National Congress
15	Mehsana	Man Sinh Prithviraj Patel	Indian National Congress
16	Panchmahals	Dahyabhai Jivanji Naik	Indian National Congress
17	Patan	Purushottamdas Rachhoddas Patel	Indian National Congress
18	Rajkot	Uchharamgrai Navalshanker Dhebar	Indian National Congress
19	Sabarkantha	Gulzarilal Nanda	Indian National Congress
20	Sabarmati (SC)	Muldas Bhudardas Vaishya	Indian National Congress
21	Surat	Morarji Desai	Indian National Congress
22	Surendranagar	Ghanshyambhai Chhotalal Oza	Indian National Congress

== Himachal Pradesh ==
INC (4)

No.	Constituency	Member	Party
1	Chamba	Chattar Singh	Indian National Congress
2	Mandi	Lalit Sen	Indian National Congress
3	Mahasu	Virbhadra Singh	Indian National Congress
4	Sirmur (SC)	Partap Singh	Indian National Congress

== Kerala ==
INC (6) CPI (6) ML (2) RSP (1) IND (3)

No.	Constituency	Member	Party
1	Ambalapuzha	P. K. Vasudevan Nair	Communist Party of India
2	Badagara	A. V. Raghavan	Independent
3	Chirayinkil	M. K. Kumaran	Communist Party of India
4	Ernakulam	A. M. Thomas	Indian National Congress
5	Kasergod	A. K. Gopalan	Communist Party of India
6	Kottayam	Mathew Maniyangadan	Indian National Congress
7	Kozhikode	C. H. Mohammed Koya	Indian Union Muslim League
8	Manjeri	M. Muhammad Ismail	Indian Union Muslim League
9	Mavelikara (SC)	R. Achuthan	Indian National Congress
10	Mukundapuram	Panampilly Govinda Menon	Indian National Congress
11	Muvattupuzha	Cherian J. Kappan	Indian National Congress
12	Palghat (SC)	Patinjara Kunhan	Communist Party of India
13	Ponnani	Ezhu Kudikkal Imbichibava	Communist Party of India
14	Quilon	N. Sreekantan Nair	Revolutionary Socialist Party
15	Tellicherry	S. K. Pottekkatt	Independent
16	Thiruvalla	Ravindra Varma	Indian National Congress
17	Trichur	K. Krishnan Warrier	Communist Party of India
18	Trivandrum	P. S. Nataraja Pillai	Independent

== Madhya Pradesh ==
INC (24) PSP (3) JS (3) SP (1) RRP (1) IND (4)

No.	Constituency	Member	Party
1	Balaghat	Bholaram Paradhi	Praja Socialist Party
2	Baloda Bazar (SC)	Minimata Agam Dass Guru	Indian National Congress
3	Bastar (ST)	Lakhmu Bhawani	Independent
4	Bhind (SC)	Suraj prasad alias Surya Prasad	Indian National Congress
5	Bhopal	Maimoona Sultan	Indian National Congress
6	Bilaspur (SC)	Satya Prakash	Independent
6	Bilaspur (SC)	Dr. Chandrabhan Singh *	Indian National Congress
7	Chhindwara	Bhikulal Lachhimichand Chandak	Indian National Congress
8	Damoh (SC)	Sahodrabai Murlidhar Rai	Indian National Congress
9	Dewas (SC)	Hukam Chand Kachwai	Jana Sangh
10	Durg	Mohan Lal Baklial	Indian National Congress
11	Guna	Ramsahai Shivprasad Pandey	Indian National Congress
12	Gwalior	Vijaya Raje Scindia	Indian National Congress
13	Hoshangabad	Hari Vishnu Kamath	Praja Socialist Party
14	Indore	Homi F. Daji	Independent
15	Jabalpur	Seth Govind Das	Indian National Congress
16	Janjgir	Amar Singh Saigal	Indian National Congress
17	Jhabua (ST)	Jamuna Devi	Indian National Congress
18	Khajuraho	Ram Sahai Tiwary	Indian National Congress
19	Khandwa	Maheshdutta Chandragopal Mishra	Indian National Congress
20	Khargone	Ramchandra Bade	Jana Sangh
21	Mahasamund	Vidya Charan Shukla	Indian National Congress
22	Mandla (ST)	Mangru Ganu Uikey	Indian National Congress
23	Mandsaur	Umashankar Muljibhai Trivedi	Jana Sangh
24	Raigarh	Vijaya Bhushan Singh Deo	Akhil Bharatiya Ram Rajya Parishad
25	Raipur	Keshar Kumari Devi	Indian National Congress
26	Rajgarh	Bhanu Prakash Singh	Independent
27	Rajnandgaon	Major Raja Bahadur Birendra Bahadur Singh	Indian National Congress
28	Rewa	Shiv Dutt Upadhyaya	Indian National Congress
29	Sagar	Jawala Prasad Jyotishi	Indian National Congress
30	Seoni (ST)	Narayanrao Maniram Wadiwa	Indian National Congress
31	Shahdol (ST)	Buddhu Singh Utiya	Socialist Party
32	Shivpuri	Vedehi Charan Parashar	Indian National Congress
33	Sidhi	Anand Chandra Joshi	Indian National Congress
34	Surguja (ST)	Babu Nath Singh	Indian National Congress
35	Tikamgarh (SC)	Kure Mate	Praja Socialist Party
36	Ujjain	Radhelal Beharilal Vyas	Indian National Congress

== Madras State ==
INC (31) DMK (7) CPI (2) FB (1)

No.	Constituency	Member	Party
1	Aruppukottai	U. Muthuramalingam Thevar	All India Forward Bloc
2	Chidambaram	R. Kanagasabai Pillai	Indian National Congress
3	Chingleput	O. V. Alagesan	Indian National Congress
4	Coimbatore	P. R. Ramakrishnan	Indian National Congress
5	Cuddalore	T. D. Ramabadran Naidu	Dravida Munnetra Kazhagam
6	Dindigul	Dr. T.S. Soundaram Ramachandran	Indian National Congress
7	Erode	S. K. Paramasivan	Indian National Congress
8	Gobichettipalayam	P. G. Karuthiruman	Indian National Congress
9	Karur	R. Ramanathan Chettiar	Indian National Congress
10	Koilpatti (SC)	S. C. Balkrishnan	Indian National Congress
11	Krishnagiri	K. Rajaram	Dravida Munnetra Kazhagam
12	Kumbakonam	C. R. Pattabhiraman	Indian National Congress
13	Madras North	Dr. P. Srinivasan	Indian National Congress
14	Madras South	Krishnan Manoharan	Dravida Munnetra Kazhagam
15	Madurai	N. M. R. Subbaraman	Indian National Congress
16	Mayuram (SC)	Maragatham Chandrasekar	Indian National Congress
17	Melur (SC)	P. Maruthiah	Indian National Congress
18	Nagapattinam (SC)	Gopalaswami Thenkondar	Indian National Congress
19	Nagercoil	A. Nesamony	Indian National Congress
20	Namakkal (SC)	V. K. Ramaswamy	Indian National Congress
21	Nilgiris	Akkamma Devi	Indian National Congress
22	Periyakulam	M. Malaichami Thevar	Indian National Congress
23	Permabalur	Era Sezhiyan	Dravida Munnetra Kazhagam
24	Pollachi	C. Subramaniam	Indian National Congress
25	Pudukkottai	R. Umanath	Communist Party of India
26	Ramanthapuram	N. Arunachalam	Indian National Congress
27	Salem	S. V. Ramaswamy	Indian National Congress
28	Sriperumbudur (SC)	P. Sivasankaran	Dravida Munnetra Kazhagam
29	Tenkasi (SC)	M. P. Swamy	Indian National Congress
30	Thanjavur	V. Vairava Thevar	Indian National Congress
31	Tindivanam	R. Venkatasubba Reddiar	Indian National Congress
32	Tiruchendur	T. T. Krishnamachari	Indian National Congress
33	Tiruchengode	P. Subbarayan	Indian National Congress
34	Tiruchirapalli	K. Ananda Nambiar	Communist Party of India
35	Tirukoilur (SC)	L. Elayaperumal	Indian National Congress
36	Tirunelveli	P. Muthiah	Indian National Congress
37	Tiruppattur	R. Muthu Goundar	Dravida Munnetra Kazhagam
38	Tiruvallur	V. Govindasamy Naidu	Indian National Congress
39	Tiruvannamalai	R. Dharmalingam	Dravida Munnetra Kazhagam
40	Vellore	T. Abdul Wahid	Indian National Congress
41	Wandiwash (SC)	A. Jayaraman	Indian National Congress

== Maharashtra ==
INC (41) PSP (1) IND (2)

No.	Constituency	Member	Party
1	Ahmednagar	Motilal Kundanmal Firodia	Indian National Congress
2	Akola	Mohammad Mohibbul Haq	Indian National Congress
3	Amravati	Panjabrao Deshmukh	Indian National Congress
3	Amravati	Vimla Deshmukh (1965 bypoll)	Indian National Congress
4	Aurangabad	Bhaurao Dagadurao Deshmukh	Indian National Congress
5	Baramati	Gulabrao Keshavrao Jedhe	Indian National Congress
6	Bhandara	Ramchandra Martand Hajarnavis	Indian National Congress
7	Bhir	Dwarka Das Mantri	Indian National Congress
8	Bhiwandi (ST)	Yashwantrao Martandrao Mukne	Indian National Congress
9	Bombay Central North (SC)	Narayan Sadoba Kajrolkar	Indian National Congress
10	Bombay Central South	Vithal Balkrishna Gandhi	Indian National Congress
11	Bombay North	V K Krishna Menon	Indian National Congress
12	Bombay South	Sadashiv Kanoji Patil	Indian National Congress
13	Buldhana (SC)	Shivram Rango Rane	Indian National Congress
14	Chanda	Lal Shyamshah Lal Bhagwanshah	Independent
14	Chanda	G. M. Tai Kannamwar (1964 bypoll)	Indian National Congress
15	Dhulia	Chudaman Ananda Rawandale Patil	Indian National Congress
16	Gondia (SC)	Balkrishna Ramchandra Wasnik	Indian National Congress
17	Hatkanangale (SC)	Krishnaji Laxman More	Indian National Congress
18	Jalgaon	Julalsing Shankarrao Patil	Indian National Congress
19	Jalna	Ramrao Narayanrao	Indian National Congress
20	Karad	Dajisaheb Chavan	Indian National Congress
21	Khamgaon (SC)	Laxman Shrawan Bhatkar	Indian National Congress
22	Khed	Raghunath Keshav Khadilkar	Indian National Congress
23	Kolaba	Bhaskar Narayan Dighe	Indian National Congress
24	Kolhapur	Vishwanath Tukaram Patil	Indian National Congress
25	Kopargaon	Annasaheb Pandurange Shinde	Indian National Congress
26	Latur (SC)	Tulsiram Dashrath Kamble	Indian National Congress
27	Malegaon	Madhavrao Laxmanrao Jadhav	Indian National Congress
28	Miraj	Vijayasinhrao Ramarao Dafle	Indian National Congress
29	Nagpur	Dr. Madhav Shrihari Aney	Independent
30	Nanded	Tulshidas Subhanrao Jadhav	Indian National Congress
31	Nandurbar (ST)	Laxman Vedu Valvi	Indian National Congress
32	Nashik	Govind Hari Deshpande	Indian National Congress
33	Osmanabad	Tulsiram Abaji Patil	Indian National Congress
34	Pandharpur (SC)	Tayappa Hari Sonavane	Indian National Congress
35	Parbhani	Shivajirao Shankarrao Deshmukh	Indian National Congress
36	Poona	Shankarrao Shantaram More	Indian National Congress
37	Rajapur	Nath Bapu Pai	Praja Socialist Party
38	Ramtek	Madhaorao Bhagwantrao Patil	Indian National Congress
39	Ratnagiri	Sharda Mukherjee	Indian National Congress
40	Satara	Kisan Veer	Indian National Congress
41	Sholapur	Madeppa Bandappa Kadadi	Indian National Congress
42	Thana	Sonubhau Dagadu Baswant	Indian National Congress
43	Wardha	Kamalnayan Jamnalal Bajaj	Indian National Congress
44	Yavatmal	Deorao Shioram Patil	Indian National Congress

== Manipur ==
INC (1) SP (1)

No.	Constituency	Member	Party
1	Inner Manipur	Salam Tonbi Singh	Indian National Congress
2	Outer Manipur (ST)	Rishang Keishing	Socialist Party

== Mysore State ==
INC (25) LSS (1)

No.	Constituency	Member	Party
1	Bangalore	H. C. Dasappa	Indian National Congress
1	Bangalore	H. K. V. Gowdha	Indian National Congress
2	Bangalore City	K. Hanumanthaiya	Indian National Congress
3	Belgaum	Balwantrao Nageshrao Datar	Indian National Congress
3	Belgaum	H.V. Koujalgi (1963 bypoll)	Indian National Congress
4	Bellary	Tekur Subramanyam	Indian National Congress
5	Bidar (SC)	Ramchandra Veerappa	Indian National Congress
6	Bijapur North	Rajaram Girdharilal Dubey	Indian National Congress
7	Bijapur South	Sanganagouda Basanagouda Patil	Indian National Congress
8	Chamarajanagar (SC)	S. M. Siddaiah	Indian National Congress
9	Chikballapur	K. Chengalaraya Reddy	Indian National Congress
9	Chikballapur	H. C. L. Reddy	Indian National Congress
10	Chikodi	Vasantrao Lakhagounda Patil	Indian National Congress
11	Chitradurga	S. Veerabasappa	Indian National Congress
12	Dharwad North	Sarojini Mahishi	Indian National Congress
13	Dharwad South	Fakruddin Husseinsad Mohsin	Indian National Congress
14	Gulbarga	Mahadevappa Rampure	Indian National Congress
15	Hassan	H. Siddananjappa	Indian National Congress
16	Kanara	Joachim Alva	Indian National Congress
17	Kolar (SC)	Dodda Thimmaiah	Indian National Congress
18	Koppal	Sivamurthi Swami	Lok Sewak Sangh
19	Mandya	M. K. Shivananjappa	Indian National Congress
20	Mangalore	A. Shanker Alva	Indian National Congress
21	Mysore	M. Shankaraiya	Indian National Congress
22	Raichur	Jagannath Rao Chandriki	Indian National Congress
23	Shimoga	S. V. Krishnamoorthy Rao	Indian National Congress
24	Tiptur	C. R. Basappa	Indian National Congress
25	Tumkur	M. V. Krishnappa	Indian National Congress
25	Tumkur	Ajit Prasad Jain	Indian National Congress
25	Tumkur	Mali Mariyappa	Indian National Congress
26	Udupi	U. Srinivas Mallya	Indian National Congress

== Orissa ==
INC (14) GP (4) SP (1) PSP (1)

No.	Constituency	Member	Party
1	Anugul	Harekrushna Mahtab	Indian National Congress
2	Baleswar	Gokulananda Mohanty	Indian National Congress
3	Bhadrak (SC)	Kanhu Charan Jena	Indian National Congress
4	Bhanjanagar (SC)	Mohan Nayak	Indian National Congress
5	Bhubaneswar	Purna Chandra Bhanja Deo	Indian National Congress
6	Bolangir (SC)	Hrushikesh Mahananda	Ganatantra Parishad
7	Chhatrapur	Ananta Tripathi Sarma	Indian National Congress
8	Cuttack	Nityanand Kanungo	Indian National Congress
9	Dhenkanal	Baishnab Charan Patnaik	Indian National Congress
10	Jajpur (SC)	Rama Chandra Mallick	Indian National Congress
11	Kalahandi	Pratap Keshari Deo	Ganatantra Parishad
12	Kendrapara	Surendranatha Dwibedi	Praja Socialist Party
13	Keonjhar	Laxmi Narayan Bhanja Deo	Indian National Congress
14	Koraput (ST)	Ramachandra Ulaka	Indian National Congress
15	Mayurbhanj (ST)	Maheswar Naik	Indian National Congress
16	Nabarangapur	R. Jagannatha Rao	Indian National Congress
17	Phulbani (SC)	Dr. Rajendra Kanhar	Ganatantra Parishad
18	Puri	Bibudhendra Mishra	Indian National Congress
19	Sambalpur	Kishen Pattanayak	Socialist Party
20	Sundargarh (ST)	Jagya Narayana Singh	Ganatantra Parishad

== Puducherry ==
INC (1)

No.	Constituency	Member	Party
1	Pondicherry	Ku. Sivappraghassan	Indian National Congress

== Punjab ==
INC (14) AD (3) JS (3) HLS (1) SP (1)

No.	Constituency	Member	Party
1	Ambala (SC)	Chuni Lal	Indian National Congress
2	Amritsar	Giani Gurmukh Singh Musafir	Indian National Congress
3	Bhatinda (SC)	Sardar Dhanna Singh Gulshan	Akali Dal
4	Ferozepur	Sardar Iqbal Singh	Indian National Congress
5	Gurdaspur	Diwan Chand Sharma	Indian National Congress
6	Gurgaon	Gajraj Singh Rao	Indian National Congress
7	Hissar	Mani Ram Bagri	Socialist Party
8	Hoshiarpur	Amarnath Vidyalankar	Indian National Congress
9	Jhajjar	Jagdev Singh Siddhanti	Haryana Lok Samiti
10	Jullundur	Sardar Swaran Singh	Indian National Congress
11	Kaithal	Dev Dutt Puri	Indian National Congress
12	Kangra	Hem Raj	Indian National Congress
13	Karnal	Swami Rameshwaranand	Jana Sangh
14	Ludhiana	Sardar Kapur Singh	Akali Dal
15	Mahendragarh	Yudhvir Singh Chaudhary	Jana Sangh
16	Moga (SC)	Buta Singh	Akali Dal
17	Patiala	Sardar Hukam Singh	Indian National Congress
18	Phillaur (SC)	Chaudhary Sadhu Ram	Indian National Congress
19	Rohtak	Lahri Singh	Jana Sangh
20	Sangrur	Sardar Ranjit Singh	Indian National Congress
21	Tarn Taran	Sardar Surjit Singh Majithia	Indian National Congress
22	Una (SC)	Sardar Daljit Singh	Indian National Congress

== Rajasthan ==
INC (1) SWA (3) RRP (1) BJS (1) IND (3)

No.	Constituency	Member	Party
1	Ajmer	Mukat Behari Lal Bhargava	Indian National Congress
2	Alwar	Kashi Ram Gupta	Independent
3	Banswara (ST)	Ratan Lal	Indian National Congress
4	Barmer	Tan Singh	Akhil Bharatiya Ram Rajya Parishad
5	Bharatpur	Raj Bahadur	Indian National Congress
6	Bhilwara	Dr. Kalu Lal Shrimali	Indian National Congress
7	Bikaner	Karni Singh	Independent
8	Chittorgarh	Manikya Lal Verma	Indian National Congress
9	Dausa	Prithvi Raj	Swatantra Party
10	Ganganagar (SC)	Pannalal Barupal	Indian National Congress
11	Hindaun	Tika Ram Paliwal	Indian National Congress
12	Jaipur	Gayatri Devi	Swatantra Party
13	Jalore	Harish Chandra Mathur	Indian National Congress
14	Jhalawar	Brijraj Singh	Indian National Congress
15	Jhunjhunu	Radheshyam Ramkumar Morarka	Indian National Congress
16	Jodhpur	Dr. Laxmi Mall Singhvi	Independent
17	Kotah (SC)	Onkarlal Berwa	Jana Sangh
18	Nagaur	S. K. Dey	Indian National Congress
19	Pali	Jaswantraj Mehta	Indian National Congress
20	Sawai Madhopur (SC)	Kesar Lal	Swatantra Party
21	Sikar	Rameshwar Tantia	Indian National Congress
22	Udaipur (ST)	Dhuleshwar Meena	Indian National Congress

== Tripura ==
CPI (2)

No.	Constituency	Member	Party
1	Tripura East (ST)	Dasarath Deb	Communist Party of India
2	Tripura West	Birendra Chandra Dutta	Communist Party of India

== Uttar Pradesh ==
IND (62) JS (7) REP (3) SWA (3) CPI (2) PSP (2) SP (1) HMS (1) IND (5)

No.	Constituency	Member	Party
1	Agra	Seth Achal Singh	Indian National Congress
2	Akbarpur (SC)	Panna Lal	Indian National Congress
3	Aligarh	Buddha Priya Maurya	Republican Party of India
4	Allahabad	Lal Bahadur Shastri	Indian National Congress
5	Almora	Jang Bahadur Singh Bisht	Indian National Congress
6	Amroha	Hifzur Rahman	Indian National Congress
7	Azamgarh	Ram Harakh Yadav	Indian National Congress
8	Bahraich	Ram Singh	Swatantra Party
9	Ballia	Murli Manohar	Indian National Congress
10	Balrampur	Subhadra Joshi	Indian National Congress
11	Banda	Savitri Nigam	Indian National Congress
12	Bansgaon (SC)	Mahadeo Prasad	Indian National Congress
13	Barabanki (SC)	Ram Sewak Yadav	Socialist Party
14	Bareilly	Brij Raj Singh	Jana Sangh
15	Basti (SC)	Sheo Narain	Indian National Congress
16	Bijnor	Prakash Vir Shastri	Independent
17	Bilhaur	Brij Behari Mehrotra	Indian National Congress
18	Bisauli	Ansar Harvani	Indian National Congress
19	Budaun	J.S. Onkar Singh	Jana Sangh
20	Bulandshahar	Surendra Pal Singh	Indian National Congress
21	Chail (SC)	Masuriya Din	Indian National Congress
22	Chandauli	Bal Krishna Singh	Indian National Congress
23	Dehradun	Mahavir Tyagi	Indian National Congress
24	Deoria	Bishwanath Roy	Indian National Congress
25	Domariaganj	Kripa Shanker	Indian National Congress
26	Etah	Bishanchander Seth	Hindu Mahasabha
27	Etawah	Gopi Nath Dixit	Indian National Congress
28	Faizabad	Brij Basi Lal	Indian National Congress
29	Farrukhabad	Mulchand Dube	Indian National Congress
30	Fatehpur	Gauri Shanker Kakkar	Independent
31	Firozabad	Shambhu Nath Chaturvedi	Indian National Congress
32	Garhwal	Bhakt Darshan	Indian National Congress
33	Gazipur	Vishwanath Singh Gahmari	Indian National Congress
34	Ghatampur (SC)	Tula Ram	Indian National Congress
35	Ghosi	Jai Bahadur Singh	Communist Party of India
36	Gonda	Ram Ratan Gupta	Indian National Congress
37	Gorakhpur	Sinhasan Singh	Indian National Congress
38	Hamirpur	Manoolal Dwivedi	Indian National Congress
39	Hapur	Kamla Chaudhry	Indian National Congress
40	Hardoi (SC)	Kinder Lal	Indian National Congress
41	Hata	Kashi Nath Pandey	Indian National Congress
42	Hathras (SC)	Joti Saroop	Republican Party of India
42	Hathras (SC)	Nardeo Snatak	Indian National Congress
43	Jalaun (SC)	Chowdhary Ram Sewak	Indian National Congress
44	Jalesar	Krishnapal Singh	Swatantra Party
45	Jaunpur	Brahm Jeet Singh	Jana Sangh
45	Jaunpur	Rajdeo Singh (1963 bypoll)	Indian National Congress
46	Jhansi	Dr. Sushila Nayar	Indian National Congress
47	Kaimganj	Prem Krishna Khanna	Indian National Congress
48	Kairana	Yashpal Singh	Independent
49	Kaiserganj	Basant Kunwar Ba	Swatantra Party
50	Kanpur	S. M. Banerjee	Independent
51	Kheri	Balgovind Verma	Indian National Congress
52	Khurja (SC)	Kanhaiya Lal Balmiki	Indian National Congress
53	Lalganj (SC)	Vishram Prasad	Praja Socialist Party
54	Lucknow	B. K. Dhaon	Indian National Congress
55	Machhlishahr (SC)	Ganapati Ram	Indian National Congress
56	Maharajganj	Dr. Mahadeva Prasad	Indian National Congress
57	Mainpuri	Badshah Gupta	Indian National Congress
58	Mathura	Chaudhary Digambar Singh	Indian National Congress
59	Merut	Shah Nawaz Khan	Indian National Congress
60	Mirzapur	Shyam Dhar Mishra	Indian National Congress
61	Misrikh (SC)	Gokaran Prasad	Jana Sangh
62	Mohanlalganj (SC)	Ganga Devi	Indian National Congress
63	Moradabad	Syed Muzaffar Hussain	Republican Party of India
64	Musafirkhana	Rananjaya Singh	Indian National Congress
65	Muzaffarnagar	Sumat Prasad	Indian National Congress
66	Nainital	Krishna Chandra Pant	Indian National Congress
67	Phulpur	Jawaharlal Nehru	Indian National Congress
67	Phulpur	Vijaya Lakshmi Pandit (1964 bypoll)	Indian National Congress
68	Pilibhit	Mohan Swarup	Praja Socialist Party
69	Pratapgarh	Ajit Pratap Singh	Jana Sangh
70	Raebareli	Baijnath Kureel	Indian National Congress
71	Rampur	Raja Syed Ahmad Mehdi	Indian National Congress
72	Ramsanehi Ghat (SC)	Swami Ramanand Shastri	Indian National Congress
73	Rasra	Sarjoo Pandey	Communist Party of India
74	Robertsganj (SC)	Ram Swarup	Indian National Congress
75	Saharanpur (SC)	Sunder Lal	Indian National Congress
76	Salempur	Vishwa Nath Pandey	Indian National Congress
77	Salon	Dinesh Singh	Indian National Congress
78	Sardhana	Krishna Chandra Sharma	Indian National Congress
79	Shahabad	Yuvraj Dutta Singh	Jana Sangh
80	Shahjahanpur (SC)	Chaudhuri Lakhan Das	Independent
81	Sitapur	Suraj Lal Verma	Jana Sangh
82	Sultanpur	Kunwar Krishna Verma	Indian National Congress
83	Tehri Garhwal	Manabendra Shah	Indian National Congress
84	Unnao	Krishna Dev Tripathi	Indian National Congress
85	Varanasi	Raghunath Singh	Indian National Congress

== West Bengal ==
IND (22) CPI (9) LSS (1) RSP (1) FB (1) IDP (1) IND (1)

	Constituency	Member	Party
1	Asansol	Atulya Ghosh	Indian National Congress
2	Ausgram (SC)	Dr. Mono Mohan Das	Indian National Congress
3	Balurghat (ST)	Sarkar Murmu	Communist Party of India
4	Bankura	Dr. Ramgati Banerji	Indian National Congress
5	Barasat	Arun Chandra Guha	Indian National Congress
6	Barrackpore	Renu Chakravartty	Communist Party of India
7	Basirhat	Humayun Kabir	Indian National Congress
8	Berhampore	Tridib Chaudhuri	Revolutionary Socialist Party
9	Birbhum (SC)	Dr. Sisir Kumar Saha	Indian National Congress
10	Burdwan	Gurugovinda Basu	Indian National Congress
10	Burdwan	Nirmal Chandra Chatterjee (1963 bypoll)	Independent
11	Calcutta Central	Hirendranath Mukherjee	Communist Party of India
12	Calcutta East	Dr. Ranenendranath Sen	Communist Party of India
13	Calcutta North West	Ashoke Kumar Sen	Indian National Congress
14	Calcutta South West	Indrajit Gupta	Communist Party of India
15	Contai	Basanta Kumar Das	Indian National Congress
16	Cooch Behar (SC)	Debendra Nath Karjee	All India Forward Bloc
16	Cooch Behar (SC)	P. C. Barman (1963 bypoll)	Indian National Congress
17	Darjeeling	Theodore Manaen	Indian National Congress
18	Diamond Harbour	Sudhansu Bhushan Das	Indian National Congress
19	Ghatal	Sachindra Chaudhuri	Indian National Congress
20	Hooghly	Prabhat Kar	Communist Party of India
21	Howrah	Mohammed Elias	Communist Party of India
22	Jalpaiguri	Nalini Ranjan Ghosh	Indian National Congress
23	Jhargram (ST)	Subodh Chandra Hansda	Indian National Congress
24	Joynagar (SC)	Paresh Nath Kayal	Indian National Congress
25	Katwa	Dr. Saradish Roy	Communist Party of India
26	Malda	Renuka Ray	Indian National Congress
27	Mathurapur (SC)	Purnendu Sekhar Naskar	Indian National Congress
28	Midnapore	Govinda Kumar Singha	Indian National Congress
29	Murshidabad	Syed Badrudduja	Independent Democratic Party
30	Nebadwip	Haripada Chattopadhyay	Independent
31	Purulia	Bhajahari Mahato	Lok Sewak Sangh
32	Raiganj	C. K. Bhattacharyya	Indian National Congress
33	Serampore	Dinendra Nath Bhattacharya	Communist Party of India
34	Tamluk	Satish Chandra Samanta	Indian National Congress
35	Uluberia	Dr. Purnendu Narayan Khan	Indian National Congress
36	Vishnupur (SC)	Dr. Pashupati Mandal	Indian National Congress

== Nominated ==
Constituency	Year	Member	Party
Anglo-Indian reserved seats in the Lok Sabha	1963	Frank Anthony	Independent
Anglo-Indian reserved seats in the Lok Sabha	1963	A. E. T. Barrow	Independent
North-East Frontier Agency	1963	Dr. Daying Ering	Indian National Congress
Andaman and Nicobar Islands	1962	Niranjan Lall	Indian National Congress
Jammu	1962	Inder Jit Malhotra	Indian National Congress
