= Bakar Ali Mirza =

Indian politician

MP Bakar Ali Mirza

Members of the 4th Lok Sabha
- In office 1967–1970
- Constituency: Secunderabad

Members of the 3rd Lok Sabha
- In office 1962–1967
- Constituency: Warangal

Personal details
- Born: 7 March 1900 Hyderabad, India
- Party: Indian National Congress
- Education: MA
- Alma mater: University of Oxford

Bakar Ali Mirza (born 7 March 1900; date of death unknown) was an Indian politician and member of parliament who represented Warangal parliamentary constituency from 1962 to 67 in 3rd Lok Sabha and Secunderabad parliamentary constituency from 1967 to 70 in 4th Lok Sabha. He was affiliated with the Indian National Congress.

== Early life and education ==
He was born to Dr. Safdar Ali Mirza in Hyderabad, Andhra Pradesh on 7 March 1900. He received his education from Nizam College. He obtained B.A from Madras Christian College and B.A. (Hons) from St Catherine's College, Oxford. He later went to Columbia where he obtained M.A.

== Career ==
He served as an assistant conservator for Forests in government of Hyderabad (now government of Telangana), however he resigned from the post and subsequently joined All India Congress Committee (A.I.C.C) at Labour Research Department in 1929. He was later appointed as general secretary of Bengal Jute Workers Union from 1929 to 35, during which he was arrested in 1930.

He also served as a labour officer of Osmanshahi Mills and Singareni Collieries in 1942, in addition to serving as a member of Osmania University Senate in 1949 and Board of Governors of Hyderabad Public School from 1948 to 56.

During his career, he was later elected as a member of Provisional Parliament and was a part of a delegation to the Inter-Parliamentary Union held at Istanbul in 1950.

The Indian National Congress later appointed him as a general secretary of the party for Hyderabad Pradesh Congress (now Telangana Pradesh Congress Committee) from 1951 to 52. From 1952 to 58, he was elected as a member of Hyderabad Public Service Commission and Andhra Pradesh Public Service Commission from 1952 to 58.

His younger brother [[Mehdi Ali Miza]] migrated to Pakistan in 1947, where he had a distinguished career as an architect.
