= S. K. Paramasivan =

Indian politician (1919/1921 – 2022)

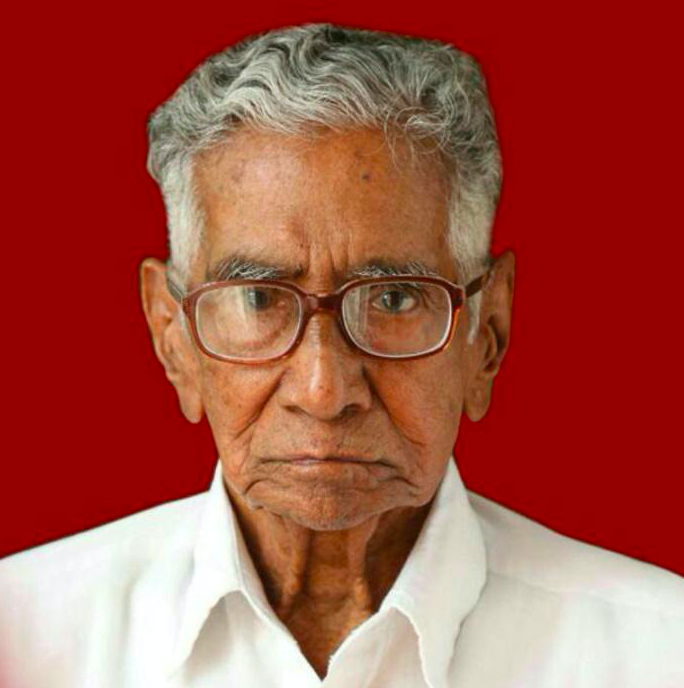

Member of Lok Sabha for Erode
- In office 1962–1967
- Prime Minister: Jawaharlal Nehru, Lal Bahadur Shastri, Indira Gandhi

Personal details
- Born: 26 February 1919 Sinniampalayam, Erode, British Raj
- Died: 30 January 2022 (aged 102) Erode, Tamil Nadu, India
- Party: Indian National Congress
- Spouse: Lakshmi
- Profession: Agriculturist, politician

Sinniampalayam Kumaraswamy Paramasivan (26 February 1919 (Note: There is some confusion with Paramasivan's date of birth, with his profile at the Third Lok Sabha calling his date of birth as 11 August 1921) – 30 January 2022) was an Indian politician who served as a member of the Third Lok Sabha, the lower house of the Parliament of India, between 1962 and 1967. Paramasivan was known for his efforts toward setting up the Aavin milk co-operative in the Erode district of Tamil Nadu as a part of the Operation Flood initiative during India's White Revolution. For his contributions to the milk cooperative movement in the region he was called Paalvalatha Thanthai (transl. Father of the Dairies) and received the Dr. Kurien award in 2010 from the National Dairy Development Board.

== Early life ==
Paramasivan was born in Sinniampalayam, a village near Erode (in the then Madras Presidency) as the tenth child to Kumarasamy Gounder and wife Kuppayi Ammal. He completed his early schooling from Ramakrishna Vidyalaya in Erode before going to Madras (now Chennai) and graduating from high school from the Mahajana High School. He later obtained his degrees from Presidency College and the Madras Law College. He was suspended from college for one year for participating in the Quit India Movement in 1942. During this time he also represented Presidency college as a captain of the football team.

== Career ==
S. K. Paramasivan joined the Indian National Congress in the 1950s. He was the president of Muthugoundenpalayam Panchayat Board for 10 years before becoming the member of Parliament from Erode constituency in the Third Lok Sabha in 1962 serving through its term until 1967. He also held office as the President of Coimbatore District Congress Committee.

During his time as a member of the third Lok Sabha, he was a member of the select committee on the seeds bill of 1964, which was constituted to regulate quality of seeds for sale. He also raised the issue of excise duties on processed handloom cloth and yarn and its impact on handloom operators and others employed by the industry. Some of the other questions brought up by Paramasivam in the sittings of the third Lok Sabha included diversion of the Cauvery river's water to the city of Madras, to remediate the city's water shortage, education of coronary heart diseases, plans for the Indian Railways to remediate issues with the then newly manufactured first-class coaches manufactured at the Integral Coach Factory in Perambur near Madras, and expansion plans for the Janata express train that operated between Madras and Delhi. He also served as a member of the select committee that studied on amendments to the Central Silk Board Act of 1948.

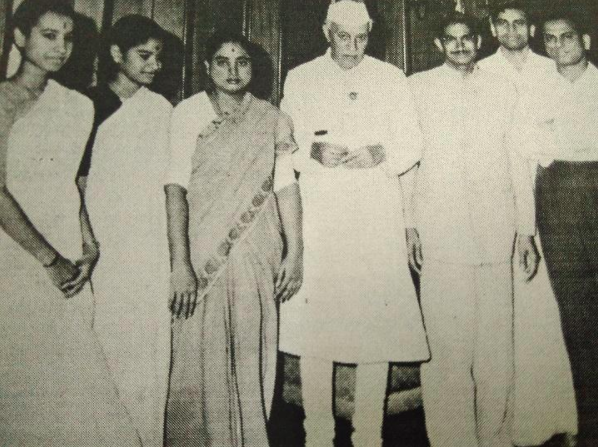
S. K. Paramasivan and his family with Jawaharlal Nehru

=== Aavin milk cooperative ===
Lal Bahadur Shastri started the National Dairy Development Board (NDDB) in 1964 with Verghese Kurien at the helm for driving what was later called India's White Revolution. Kurien chose Paramasivan to lead the effort in Tamil Nadu. Paramasivam pioneered the cooperative movement in the region by setting up milk producers' cooperative societies and the Erode Milk Producers Cooperative Union (Aavin) in Chithode in 1976. He also set up the Aavin Dairy, which operates in 55 acres in Chithode, dairy cold storage units in Dharapuram and Sathyamangalam were established. He was also responsible for many Milk producers' Cooperative Societies in many villages near Erode. He also served as the first president of the cooperative union. During this time, he also set up the Aavin cattle feed unit. For these contributions, he was called Paalvalatha Thanthai (transl. Father of the Dairies) in and around Erode. He expanded the cooperative setup to other produce as well by setting up the Erode Cooperative Marketing Society in Karungalpalayam with the intent of ensuring fair price for farmers' produce particularly turmeric. He also held positions including the head of Sinniyampalayam Milk Producers' Cooperative Bank for 35 years and Erode District Milk Producers' Cooperative Union for 4 years.

Paramasivan was awarded the Dr. Kurien Award in 2010 by the Indian Dairy Association for his contributions to milk cooperatives in the region. Writing about his contributions to the milk cooperative movement in a 2010 article, The Hindu newspaper said, "If hundreds of milk producers in and around Erode get good price today, the credit goes to S.K. Paramasivan."

=== Philanthropy ===
When Acharya Vinoba Bhave started Bhoodhan movement, many landlords donated part of their land to poor and the landless. In Tamil Nadu, S. K. Paramasivan donated a sixth of his land and to landless farmers. He was also noted to have contributed his household gold jewelry weighing approximately 7 pounds to then prime minister's war fund during the India-China War in 1962.

== Personal life ==
Paramasivan was married to Lakshmi Paramasivan. The couple had two sons and two daughters and lived in Erode. Paramasivan was commonly referred to as S. K. P. or S. K. P. thatha. (Note: "Thatha" means "grandfather" in the Tamil language.) He was active late into his life, including unveiling a bust of Verghese Kurien at the National Dairy Development Board campus in Erode in 2015 and casting his ballot in Erode during the 2019 general election when he was aged 100. He died in Tiruchengode on 30 January 2022, aged 102.
