= K. V. Thangkabalu =

Indian politician

President of the Tamil Nadu Congress Committee
- In office 2008–2011
- Preceded by: M. Krishnasamy
- Succeeded by: B. S. Gnanadesikan

Member of Parliament
- In office 16 May 2004 – 16 May 2009
- Preceded by: T. M. Selvaganapathy
- Succeeded by: S. Semmalai
- Constituency: Salem

Personal details
- Born: 15 March 1950 (age 76) Salem, Madras State, India
- Party: INC
- Spouse: T. Jayanthi
- Children: 1 son and 1 daughter

K. V. Thangkabalu (born 15 March 1950) is a former member of the Lok Sabha of India. He represented the Salem constituency of Tamil Nadu and is a member of the Indian National Congress (INC) political party.

== Career ==
In July 2008, K. V. Thangkabalu was appointed president of the Tamil Nadu Congress Committee. He was the translator for Rahul Gandhi's campaign for lok shabha elections 2019 in Tamil Nadu
