= White revolution (India) =

Landmark dairy development project

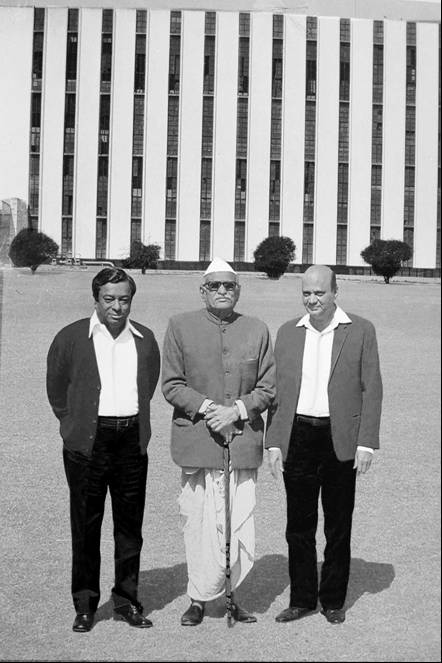
The Amul trinity (left to right): Verghese Kurien, Tribhuvandas Kishibhai Patel, and Harichand Megha Dalaya

The White Revolution, or Operation Flood, launched on 13 January 1970, was the world's largest dairy development programme and a landmark project of India's NDDB. It transformed India from a milk-deficient nation into the world's largest milk producer, surpassing the United States in 1998 with about 22.29 percent of global output in 2018. Within 30 years, it doubled the milk available per person in India and made dairy farming India's largest self-sustainable rural employment generator. The programme was launched to help farmers direct their own development and to give them control of the resources they create.

Verghese Kurien, was named the Chairman of NDDB by Prime Minister Lal Bahadur Shastri. Kurien thrust the programme towards success and has since been recognised as its architect. The making of skimmed milk powder out of buffalo milk, termed the Anand Pattern Experiment at Amul, was also instrumental to the program's success; this was made possible by Harichand Megha Dalaya, alongside Kurien. It allowed Amul to compete successfully with cow milk-based suppliers such as Nestlé.

== Introduction and objective ==
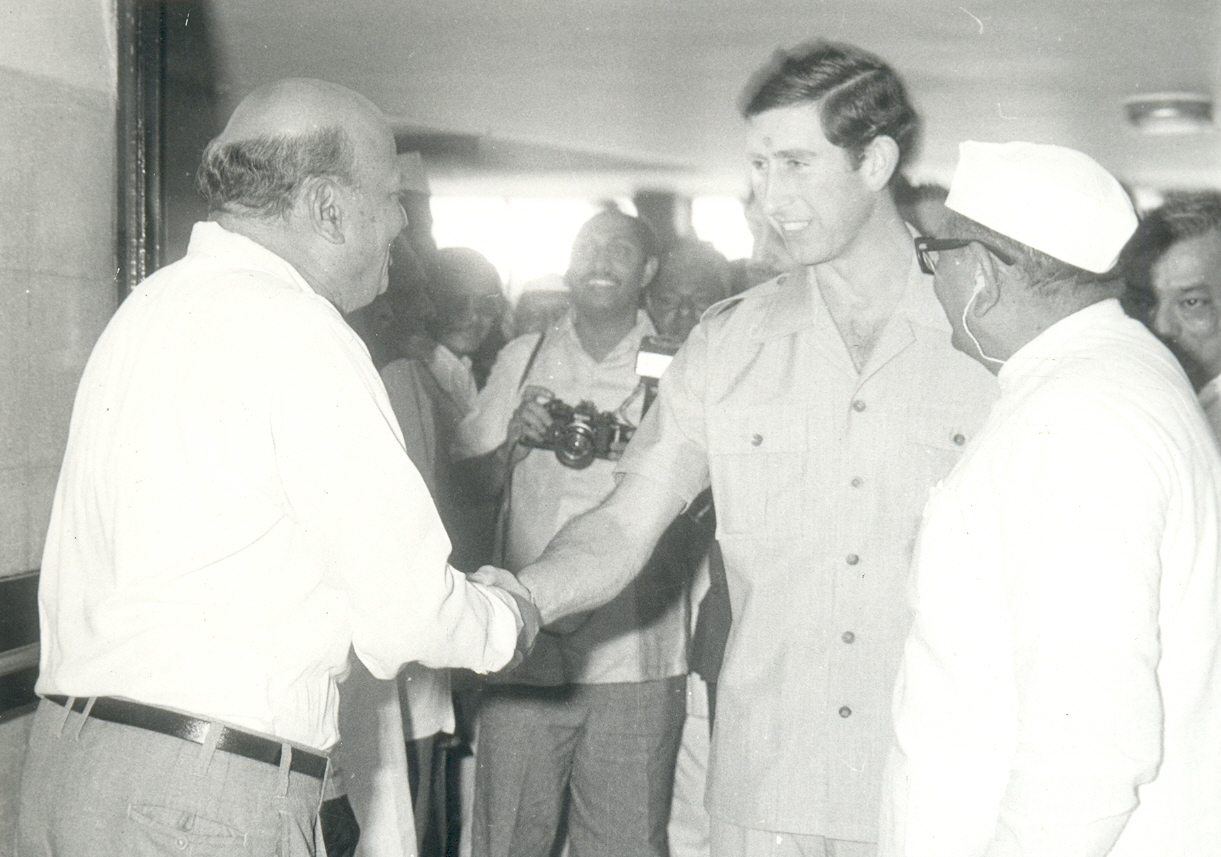
Prince Charles, Prince of Wales, visits India and Amul with Harichand Megha Dalaya, in December 1980

Operation Flood was the programme that led to the "White Revolution." It created a national milk grid linking producers throughout India to consumers in over 700 towns and cities, reducing seasonal and regional price variations while ensuring that producers got a major share of the profit by eliminating the middlemen. At the bedrock of Operation Flood stood the village milk producers' co-operatives, which procured milk and provided inputs and services, making modern management and technology available to all members.

Operation Flood's objectives included:

- Increase in milk production
- Augmented rural incomes
- Fair prices for consumers
- Increased income and reduced poverty among participating farmers while ensuring steady supply of milk in return

== Program implementation ==
Operation Flood was implemented in three phases:

=== Phase I ===
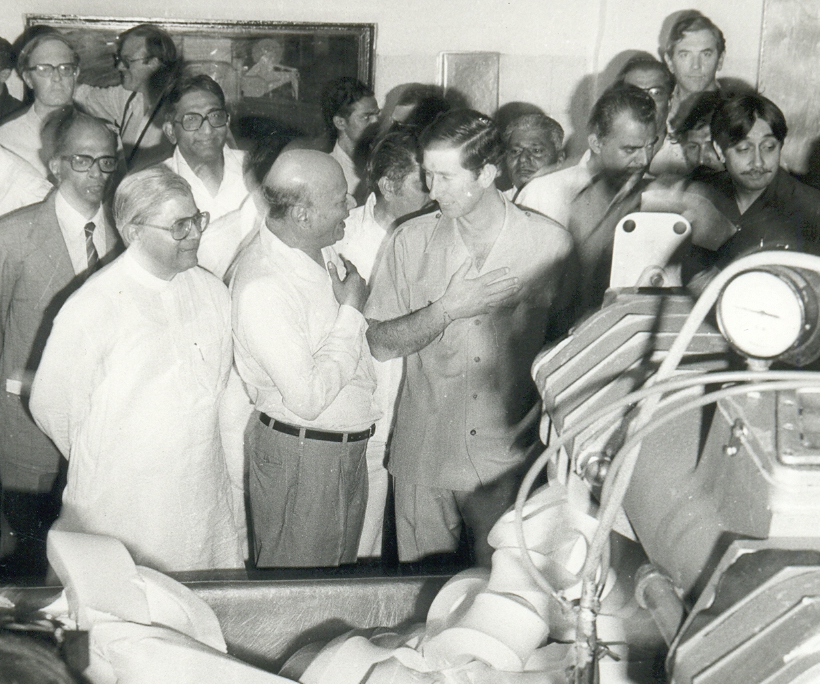
Prince Charles, Prince of Wales, visits India and Amul with Harichand Megha Dalaya, in December 1980.

Phase I (1970–1980) was financed by the sale of skimmed milk powder and butter oil donated by the European Economic Community (EEC) through the World Food Programme (WFP). NDDB planned the programme and negotiated the details of EEC assistance. During this phase, Operation Flood linked 18 of India's premier milk sheds with consumers in India's major metropolitan cities: Delhi, Mumbai, Kolkata, and Chennai, establishing mother dairies in the four metros. Operation Flood-I was originally meant to be completed in 1975, but it eventually lasted until the end of 1979, at a total cost of ₹1.16 billion. At the start of Operation Flood-I, in 1970, certain aims were kept in view for the implementation of the programs:

- Improving the organized dairy sector in metropolitan cities Mumbai (then Bombay), Kolkata (then Calcutta), Chennai (then Madras), and Delhi through marketing,
- An increase in producers' share in the milk market,
- The speeding up of the development of dairy animals in rural areas to increase both production and procurement.

=== Phase II ===
Operation Flood Phase II (1981–1985) increased the number of milk sheds from 18 to 136; urban markets also expanded the outlets for milk to 290. By the end of 1985, a self-sustaining system of 43,000 village co-operatives with 4,250,000 milk producers was covered. Domestic milk powder production increased from 22,000 metric tonnes in the pre-project year to 140,000 tonnes by 1989, with all of this increase coming from dairies set up under Operation Flood. In this way, EEC gifts and a World Bank loan helped promote self-reliance. Direct marketing of milk by producers' co-operatives also increased by several million liters a day.

=== Phase III ===
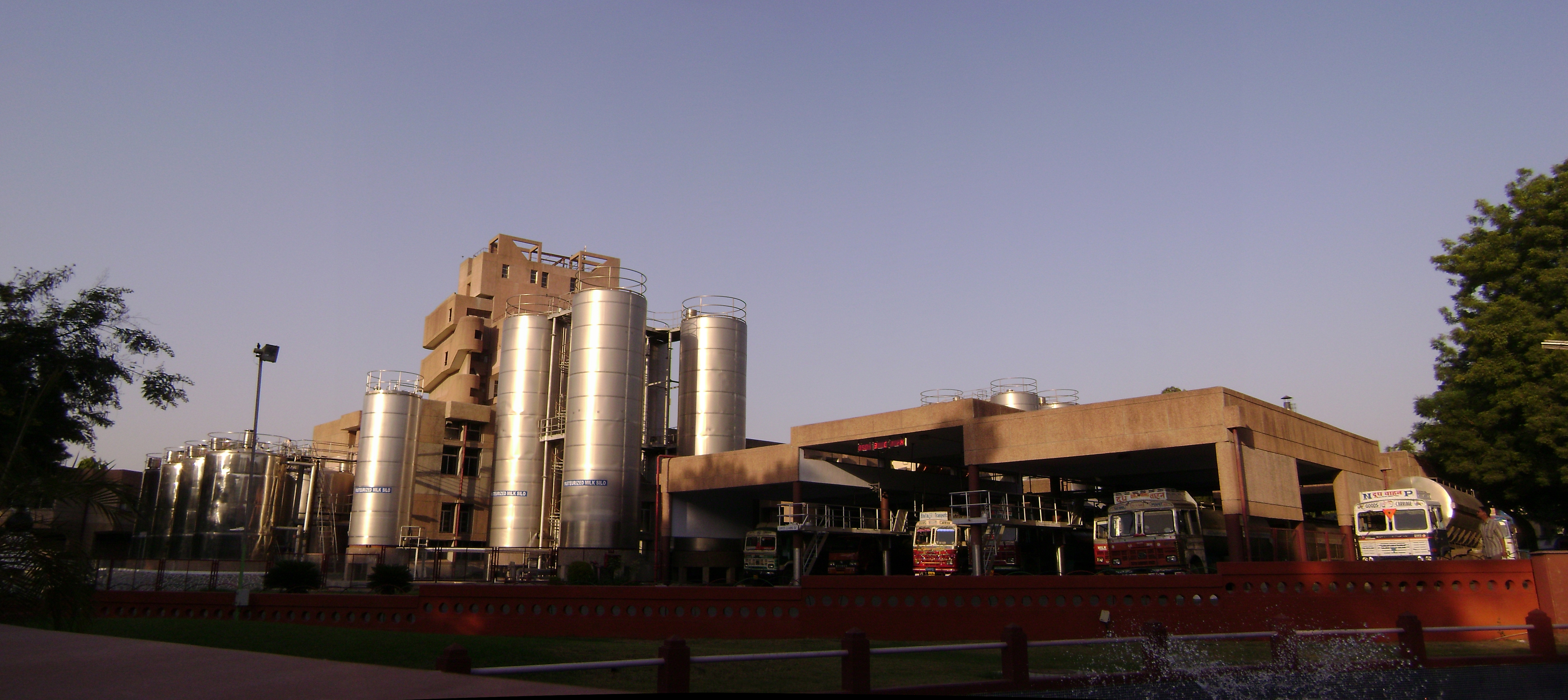
Amul Dairy Plant at Anand, Gujarat, was a highly successful co-operative started during Operation Flood in the 1970s.

Phase III (1985–1996) enabled dairy co-operatives to expand and strengthen the infrastructure required to procure and market increasing volumes of milk. Veterinary first-aid health care services, feed, and artificial insemination services for co-operative members were extended, along with intensified member education. Operation Flood's Phase III consolidated India's dairy co-operative movement, adding 30,000 new dairy co-operatives to the 43,000 existing co-operatives organised during Phase II. The number of milk sheds peaked at 173 in 1988–89, with the numbers of female members and female dairy co-operative societies increasing significantly. Phase III also increased emphasis on research and development in animal health and nutrition. Innovations such as a vaccine for theileriosis, bypassing protein feed and urea-molasses mineral blocks, contributed to the enhanced productivity of milk-producing animals.

== See also ==
- Green Revolution in India
- Amrita Patel
- Amul
- Cooperative movement in India
- Kheda district aka Kaira District
