= Bengal Chatkal Mazdoor Federation =

Trade union in India

- Location: India
- Affiliations: All India Central Council of Trade Unions

Bengal Chatkal Mazdoor Federation is a trade union of jute mill workers in West Bengal, India. The union is affiliated to the All India Central Council of Trade Unions.
