= Coimbatore District Textile Workers Union =

Trade union in India

Coimbatore District Textile Workers Union, a trade union in the textile industry in Coimbatore District, Tamil Nadu, India. CDTWU is affiliated to the Hind Mazdoor Sabha. In 1963, the union claimed 20,000 members.
