= Bengal Provincial Chatkal Mazdoor Union =

Trade union in India

Bengal Provincial Chatkal Mazdoor Union is a trade union of jute mill workers in West Bengal, India. The union is affiliated to the United Trade Union Congress.
