= All India Jute Textile Workers Federation =

Trade union in India

All India Jute Textile Workers' Federation
- Location: India
- Affiliations: Hind Mazdoor Sabha

All India Jute Textile Workers' Federation, a trade union of jute mill workers in India. The union is affiliated to the Hind Mazdoor Sabha.

In 2019, the All India Jute Textile Workers Federation, along with many other unions represented the workmen in West Bengal and took part in the tripartite talks.
