= Rail Bhawan =

Bhawan railway headquarters

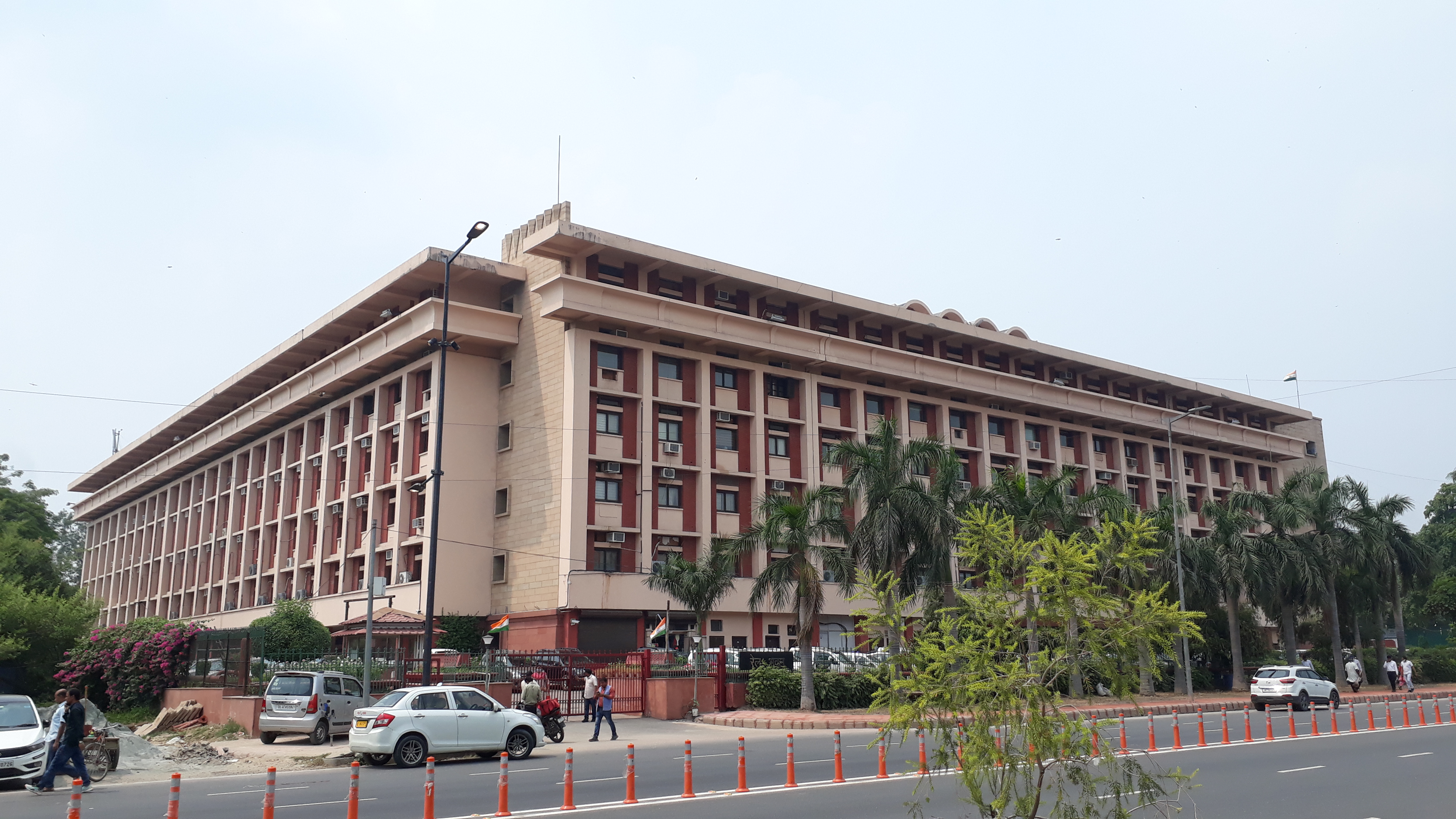
- Rail Bhawan in New Delhi

- Location within Delhi

General information
- Status: Functioning
- Location: 1, Raisina Road, New Delhi, Delhi, India
- Coordinates: 28.615889°N 77.211399°E
- Owner: Government of India

Rail Bhawan is the headquarters of the Indian Railways. It is located at Raisina Road, New Delhi, near the Sansad Bhavan (Parliament House).

The office of Minister of Railways Shri Ashwini Vaishnaw and Minister of State, Railways Shri Ravneet Singh and Shri V. Somanna is in the Rail Bhavan, along with the Railway Board, comprising 7 members headed by Chairman Railway Board, Shri Satish Kumar.

== History ==
Rail Bhawan was inaugurated in 1962 and functions as the headquarters of Indian Railways. A notable historic fixture on its ground was an old Darjeeling Himalayan Railway steam locomotive from 1925 that was relocated in 2021 to the National Rail Museum, replaced by a symbolic Vande Bharat Express replica to reflect modern railway advancement. In 2021, the Railway Board approved a modernization plan as part of the Central Vista Redevelopment Project, aimed at aligning Rail Bhawan's aesthetics and facilities with a broader vision of a contemporary and cohesive government secretariat.

== Architecture ==
Rail Bhawan is situated near the Parliament House in Lutyens' New Delhi, Rail Bhawan embodies the formal government architecture typical of the 1930s-40s. The building's prime location and structural solidity reflect its central administrative function. The building has Chajjas and Chattris on its roof, topped by domes. This is to reflect Luytens' architectural style in the building. The architectural overhaul under the Central Vista plan is focused on enhancing internal space efficiency, with improved ventilation, better natural light, and a decluttered work environment.
