= Salem Lok Sabha constituency =

Parliamentary constituency in Tamil Nadu, India

Coordinates: 11.67°N 78.15°E

Salem
- Lok Sabha constituency
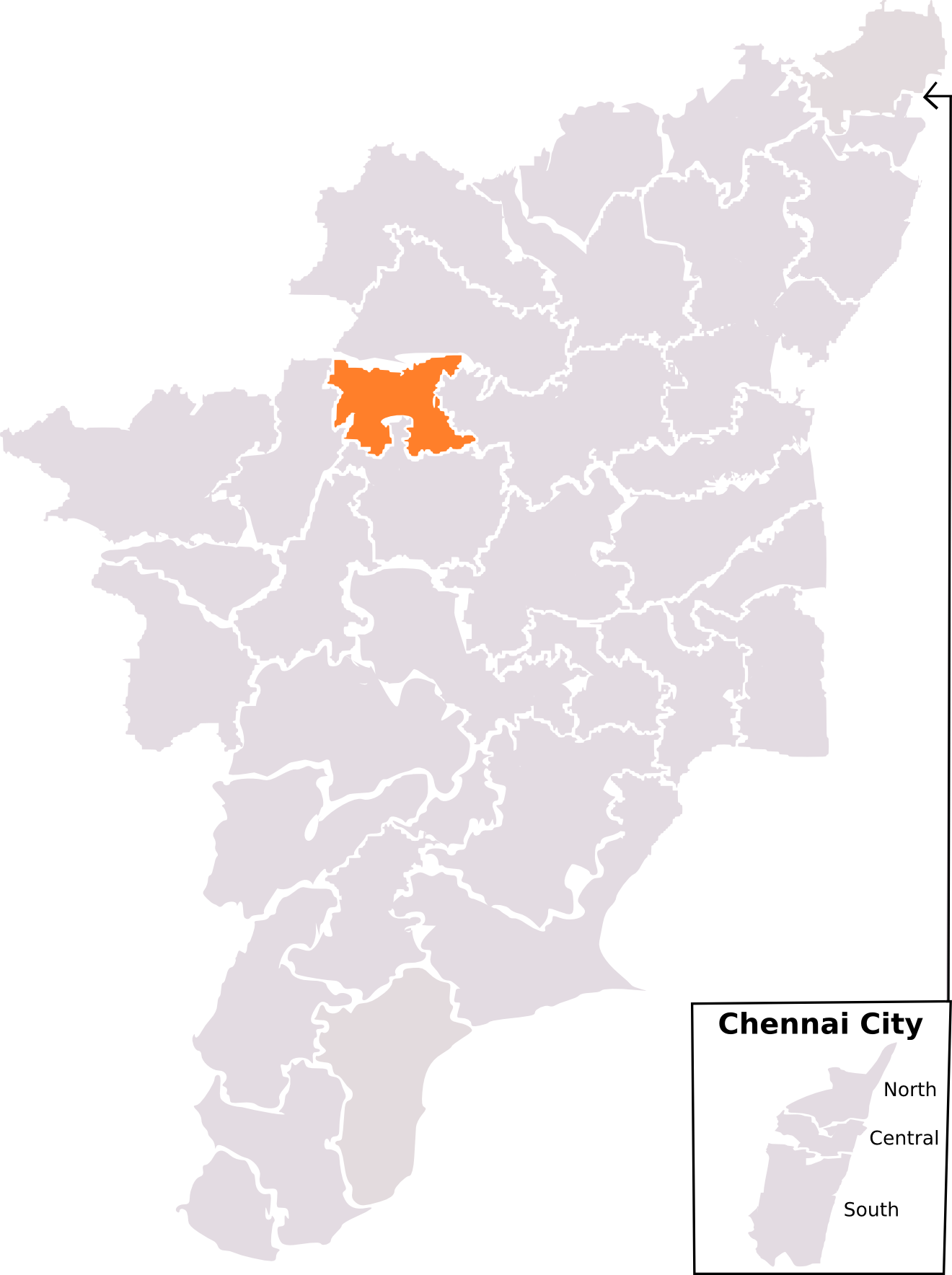
- Salem constituency, post-2008 delimitation

Constituency details
- Country: India
- Region: South India
- State: Tamil Nadu
- Assembly constituencies: Omalur; Edappadi; Salem West; Salem North; Salem South; Veerapandi
- Established: 1952-present
- Total electors: 16,11,982

Member of Parliament
- 18th Lok Sabha
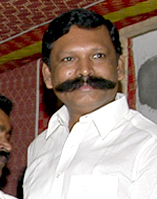
- Incumbent T. M. Selvaganapathy
- Party: DMK
- Alliance: None
- Elected year: 2024

Salem is a parliamentary (Lok Sabha) constituency in Tamil Nadu, India. Its Tamil Nadu Parliamentary Constituency number is 15 of 39. It includes 6 Assembly constituencies like Edappadi, Omalur, Salem North, Salem South, Salem West and Veerapandi.

== History ==
Since 1952, the Salem parliament seat was held by the Indian National Congress eight times (1952, 1957, 1962, 1984, 1989, 1991 and 2004) by DMK five times (1967, 1971, 1980, 2019 and 2024 ) by the ADMK four times (1977, 1991, 2009 and 2014), and once each by an independent (1998) and the Tamil Maanila Congress (1996).

== Assembly segments ==
Salem Lok Sabha constituency is composed of the following assembly segments:

Constituency number	Name	Reserved for (SC/ST/None)	District	Party	2024 Lead
84.	Omalur	None	Salem	AIADMK	DMK
86.	Edappadi	None	Salem	AIADMK	AIADMK
88.	Salem West	None	Salem	TVK	DMK
89.	Salem North	None	Salem	TVK	DMK
90.	Salem South	None	Salem	TVK	DMK
91.	Veerapandi	None	Salem	TVK	DMK

=== Before 2009 ===
1. Salem I (defunct)
2. Salem II (defunct)
3. Omalur
4. Yercuad (ST) (moved to Kallakurichi in 2009)
5. Veerapandi
6. Panamarathupatti (defunct)

== Members of the Parliament ==
Year	Duration	Name	Party
First	1952-57	S. V. Ramaswamy	Indian National Congress
Second	1957-62	S. V. Ramaswamy	Indian National Congress
Third	1962-67	S. V. Ramaswamy	Indian National Congress
Fourth	1967-71	K. Rajaram	Dravida Munnetra Kazhagam
Fifth	1971-77	E. R. Krishnan	Dravida Munnetra Kazhagam
Sixth	1977-80	P. Kannan	All India Anna Dravida Munnetra Kazhagam
Seventh	1980-84	C. Palaniappan	Dravida Munnetra Kazhagam
Eighth	1984-89	Rangarajan Kumaramangalam	Indian National Congress
Ninth	1989-91	Rangarajan Kumaramangalam	Indian National Congress
Tenth	1991-96	Rangarajan Kumaramangalam	Indian National Congress
Eleventh	1996-98	R. Devadass	Tamil Maanila Congress
Twelfth	1998-99	Vazhappady Ramamurthy	Independent
Thirteenth	1999-04	T. M. Selvaganapathi	All India Anna Dravida Munnetra Kazhagam
Fourteenth	2004-09	K. V. Thangabalu	Indian National Congress
Fifteenth	2009-14	S. Semmalai	All India Anna Dravida Munnetra Kazhagam
Sixteenth	2014-19	V. Pannerselvam	All India Anna Dravida Munnetra Kazhagam
Seventeenth	2019-24	S. R. Parthiban	Dravida Munnetra Kazhagam
Eighteenth	2024-incumbent	T. M. Selvaganapathy	Dravida Munnetra Kazhagam

== Election results ==
Vote share of Winning candidates
2024	43.98%
2019	48.51%
2014	49.27%
2009	42.51%
2004	59.96%
1999	49.73%
1998	55.47%
1996	47.07%
1991	67.03%
1989	60.85%
1984	69.21%
1980	50.85%
1977	58.71%
1971	55.87%
1967	57.07%
1962	49.34%
1957	47.18%
1951	44.44%

=== General Elections 2024 ===
2024 Indian general election: Salem
Party	Candidate	Votes	%	±%
DMK	T. M. Selvaganapathy	566,085	43.38	▼5.13
AIADMK	P. Vignesh	495,728	37.99	▲1.23
PMK	Annadurai	127,139	9.74	
NOTA	None of the above	14,894	1.14	▼0.23
Margin of victory		70,357	5.39	−
Turnout		1,304,844	78.16	
Registered electors		16,58,681		
DMK hold		Swing		

=== General Elections 2019 ===
2019 Indian general election: Salem
Party	Candidate	Votes	%	±%
DMK	S. R. Parthiban	606,302	48.51	22.94
AIADMK	K. R. S. Saravanan	4,59,376	36.76	−12.51
MNM	M. Prabhu Manikandan Mudaliar	58,662	4.69	
Independent	S. K. Selvam	52,332	4.19	
NOTA	None of the above	17,130	1.37	−0.45
Margin of victory		1,46,926	11.76	−11.93
Turnout		12,49,755	77.91	2.11
Registered electors		16,12,512		7.62
DMK gain from AIADMK		Swing	-0.75	

=== General Elections 2014 ===
2014 Indian general election: Salem
Party	Candidate	Votes	%	±%
AIADMK	V. Pannerselvam	556,546	49.27	6.75
DMK	S. Umarani	2,88,936	25.58	
DMDK	L. K. Sudhish	2,01,265	17.82	4.37
INC	Rangarajan Kumaramangalam	46,477	4.11	−33.20
NOTA	None of the above	20,601	1.82	
Independent	N. Chinnusamy	5,374	0.48	
AAP	E. Satheesh Kumar	5,198	0.46	
Margin of victory		2,67,610	23.69	18.49
Turnout		11,29,695	76.80	−0.97
Registered electors		14,98,350		27.86
AIADMK hold		Swing	6.75	

=== General Elections 2009 ===
2009 Indian general election: Salem
Party	Candidate	Votes	%	±%
AIADMK	S. Semmalai	380,460	42.51	6.24
INC	K. V. Thangkabalu	3,33,969	37.32	−22.64
DMDK	R. Mohan Raj	1,20,325	13.45	
Independent	C. Selladurai	23,056	2.58	
Margin of victory		46,491	5.20	−18.49
Turnout		8,94,916	76.42	17.11
Registered electors		11,71,839		−6.34
AIADMK gain from INC		Swing	-17.45	

=== General Elections 2004 ===
2004 Indian general election: Salem
Party	Candidate	Votes	%	±%
INC	K. V. Thangkabalu	444,591	59.96	
AIADMK	A. Rajasekaran	2,68,964	36.28	−13.46
Independent	M. A. Shah Jahan	8,466	1.14	
Independent	C. D. Jaya Venugopal	4,346	0.59	
ABHM	N. Balakrishnan	4,101	0.55	
JP	R. Rajavel	3,916	0.53	
Margin of victory		1,75,627	23.69	20.21
Turnout		7,41,437	59.29	0.10
Registered electors		12,51,141		−0.50
INC gain from AIADMK		Swing	10.23	

=== General Elections 1999 ===
1999 Indian general election: Salem
Party	Candidate	Votes	%	±%
AIADMK	T. M. Selvaganapathy	363,689	49.73	
Tamizhaga Rajiv Congress	Vazhappady K. Ramamurthy	3,38,278	46.26	
TMC(M)	R. Devadass	19,604	2.68	
Margin of victory		25,411	3.47	−17.15
Turnout		7,31,277	59.17	−6.20
Registered electors		12,57,383		6.72
AIADMK gain from Independent		Swing	2.66	

=== General Elections 1998 ===
1998 Indian general election: Salem
Party	Candidate	Votes	%	±%
Independent	Vazhappady K. Ramamurthy	365,557	55.47	
TMC(M)	R. Devadass	2,29,677	34.85	
INC	K. V. Thangkabalu	48,027	7.29	
Independent	P. Sampathkumar	10,311	1.56	
Margin of victory		1,35,880	20.62	2.57
Turnout		6,58,973	57.70	−7.66
Registered electors		11,78,177		9.01
Independent gain from TMC(M)		Swing	8.40	

=== General Elections 1996 ===
1996 Indian general election: Salem
Party	Candidate	Votes	%	±%
TMC(M)	R. Devadass	315,277	47.07	
INC	K. V. Thangkabalu	1,94,392	29.02	−38.01
AIIC(T)	Rangarajan Kumaramangalam	1,20,345	17.97	
BJP	N. Rajamani	9,538	1.42	0.13
MDMK	B. Mohanraj	6,245	0.93	
Independent	A. C. Murugesan	4,927	0.74	
Margin of victory		1,20,885	18.05	−28.60
Turnout		6,69,817	65.36	4.25
Registered electors		10,80,762		4.92
TMC(M) gain from INC		Swing	-19.96	

=== General Elections 1991 ===
1991 Indian general election: Salem
Party	Candidate	Votes	%	±%
INC	Rangarajan Kumaramangalam	406,042	67.03	6.18
DMK	K. P. Arthanarisamy	1,23,474	20.38	−3.77
PMK	K. Arjunan	56,775	9.37	
BJP	K. S. Ramanathan	7,867	1.30	
Margin of victory		2,82,568	46.65	9.95
Turnout		6,05,749	61.11	−3.67
Registered electors		10,30,128		−0.19
INC hold		Swing	6.18	

=== General Elections 1989 ===
1989 Indian general election: Salem
Party	Candidate	Votes	%	±%
INC	Rangarajan Kumaramangalam	400,936	60.85	−8.36
DMK	M. Karthikeyan	1,59,166	24.16	
PMK	K. Sadasivam	85,628	13.00	
Tamiliar Kazhagam	A. Balasumbramaniam	5,721	0.87	
Margin of victory		2,41,770	36.69	−8.74
Turnout		6,58,885	64.78	−6.69
Registered electors		10,32,058		34.59
INC hold		Swing	-8.36	

=== General Elections 1984 ===
1984 Indian general election: Salem
Party	Candidate	Votes	%	±%
INC	Rangarajan Kumaramangalam	359,819	69.21	
JP	M. A. Kandasamy	1,23,644	23.78	
Independent	T. Sambalingam	6,808	1.31	
Independent	O. K. Ekambaram	6,218	1.20	
Independent	P. Raju	5,785	1.11	
Independent	A. M. Vachravel	3,445	0.66	
Independent	M. Sengottuvelu	3,430	0.66	
Independent	G. Selvaraj	2,752	0.53	
Independent	R. Thangaraju	2,660	0.51	
Margin of victory		2,36,175	45.43	39.72
Turnout		5,19,863	71.47	3.40
Registered electors		7,66,792		10.91
INC gain from DMK		Swing	18.36	

=== General Elections 1980 ===
1980 Indian general election: Salem
Party	Candidate	Votes	%	±%
DMK	V. S. Chandirakumar	233,971	50.85	10.53
AIADMK	P. Kamnan	2,07,713	45.14	−13.57
INC(U)	M. Gandhinathan	5,381	1.17	
Independent	T. Sambalingam	3,327	0.72	
Independent	P. N. Balasubramaniam	3,007	0.65	
Margin of victory		26,258	5.71	−12.68
Turnout		4,60,108	68.07	3.11
Registered electors		6,91,389		1.98
DMK gain from AIADMK		Swing	-7.86	

=== General Elections 1977 ===
1977 Indian general election: Salem
Party	Candidate	Votes	%	±%
AIADMK	P. Kannan	254,138	58.71	
DMK	K. Rajaram	1,74,534	40.32	−15.55
Margin of victory		79,604	18.39	5.12
Turnout		4,32,869	64.96	−5.91
Registered electors		6,77,947		13.65
AIADMK gain from DMK		Swing	2.84	

=== General Elections 1971 ===
1971 Indian general election: Salem
Party	Candidate	Votes	%	±%
DMK	E. R. Krishnan	230,736	55.87	−1.19
INC	M. P. Subramanyam	1,75,940	42.60	2.06
ABJS	K. N. Lakshmanan	3,944	0.96	
Independent	T. V. Anganna Chettiar	2,339	0.57	
Margin of victory		54,796	13.27	−3.25
Turnout		4,12,959	70.87	−4.73
Registered electors		5,96,531		14.64
DMK hold		Swing	-1.19	

=== General Elections 1967 ===
1967 Indian general election: Salem
Party	Candidate	Votes	%	±%
DMK	K. Rajaram	219,380	57.07	11.65
INC	R. Ramakrishnan	1,55,871	40.55	−8.79
ABJS	R. S. Rao	9,168	2.38	
Margin of victory		63,509	16.52	12.59
Turnout		3,84,419	75.61	5.99
Registered electors		5,20,373		18.15
DMK gain from INC		Swing	7.73	

=== General Elections 1962 ===
1962 Indian general election: Salem
Party	Candidate	Votes	%	±%
INC	S. V. Ramaswamy	147,525	49.34	2.16
DMK	K. Rajagopal	1,35,787	45.42	
Independent	R. K. Periasamy	5,605	1.87	
Independent	T. S. Periasami	5,493	1.84	
ABJS	J. Srinivasan	4,581	1.53	
Margin of victory		11,738	3.93	−26.25
Turnout		2,98,991	69.62	24.60
Registered electors		4,40,434		9.63
INC hold		Swing	2.16	

=== General Elections 1957 ===
1957 Indian general election: Salem
Party	Candidate	Votes	%	±%
INC	S. V. Ramaswamy	85,342	47.18	2.74
Independent	S. K. Babie Kandasami	30,764	17.01	
Independent	A. Ganesasankaran	29,529	16.32	
Independent	B. V. Govindaraj	26,878	14.86	
Independent	Manicka Mudaliar	8,370	4.63	
Margin of victory		54,578	30.17	24.84
Turnout		1,80,883	45.02	−10.59
Registered electors		4,01,741		9.64
INC hold		Swing	2.74	

=== General Elections 1951 ===
1951–52 Indian general election: Salem
Party	Candidate	Votes	%	±%
INC	S. V. Ramaswamy	90,570	44.44	44.44
Independent	Rao Sahaib S. Durai samy Pillai	79,705	39.11	
Independent	Rangaiah	33,517	16.45	
Margin of victory		10,865	5.33	
Turnout		2,03,792	55.62	
Registered electors		3,66,410		0.00
INC win (new seat)				

== See also ==
- Salem
- List of constituencies of the Lok Sabha
