= Sheo Narain =

Indian politician (1913–1987)

Member of parliament, Lok Sabha
- In office 1962–1971, 1977–1980
- Constituency: Basti

Personal details
- Born: 14 July 1913 Basti, United Provinces, British India
- Died: 11 November 1987 (aged 74) Basti, India
- Party: Janata Party
- Spouse: Mulka Devi
- Children: 2 sons 4 daughters

Sheo Narain (14 July 1913 – 11 November 1987) was an Indian politician. He was elected to the Lok Sabha, lower house of the Parliament of India from Basti Uttar Pradesh in 1967 and 1977 .He was earlier elected in 1962 to the Lok Sabha from the Bansi Lok Sabha constituency . He was the Minister for State for Railways Under Morarji Desai from 1977 to 1979. He was earlier elected to the Uttar Pradesh Legislative Assembly and Legislative council . Narain died in Basti on 11 November 1987, at the age of 74.
