= National Union of Jute Workers =

Trade union in India

The National Union of Jute Workers, a trade union of jute mill workers with headquarters in West Bengal, India. The union is affiliated to the Indian National Trade Union Congress. Along with the Bengal Chatkal Mazdorr Union, affiliated to CITU, it is considered one of the two leading unions for jute workers India.
