= S. V. Ramaswamy =

Indian politician

S. V. Ramaswamy was an Indian politician and former Member of Parliament elected from Tamil Nadu. He was elected to the Lok Sabha from Salem constituency as an Indian National Congress candidate in 1951, 1957 and 1962 elections.
