= Tribhuvandas Foundation =

Tribhuvandas Foundation is a public Charitable trust working with the AMUL milk cooperatives in and around Kheda district of Gujarat. Its mission is to work for betterment of health in rural communities of Central Gujarat.

== History ==
Under the leadership of Tribhuvandas Kishibhai Patel in August 1973, Amul celebrated its 25th anniversary with Morarji Desai, Maniben Patel and Verghese Kurien. When he voluntarily retired from the Chairmanship of AMUL, in the early 1970s, he was presented with a purse of six hundred thousand rupees, by the grateful members of the village cooperatives — one rupee per member being the contribution. He used this fund to start a charitable trust and NGO, named the Tribhuvandas Foundation, to work on women and child health in the Kheda district of Gujarat. TF as it is commonly known was registered as a public charitable trust in 1975, under the Bombay Public Trust act, 1950. He was the first Chairman of Tribhuvandas Foundation. He handed over the chairmanship to Verghese Kurien, when the organization started to grow quickly, after receiving funds from foreign grant s.

The Tribhuvandas Foundation was set up by Tribhuvandas Kishibhai Patel- the founding Chairman of the Kheda District Milk Producers Cooperative Union, today better known as AMUL.

Tribhuvandas Foundation started activities in 1980, with grants from National Dairy Development Board, AMUL and UNICEF. It later received grants from the Overseas Development Administration, the predecessor to DFID. The initial project plan conceived TF as an Integrated rural development program. It is now a Community health organisation, working mainly on reproductive and child health.

== Work ==
TF covers around 682 villages, working through the village milk cooperatives of AMUL, in 18 talukas in the districts of Anand and Kheda in Gujarat state of India. The population covered would be around 1,600,000 (around sixteen lakhs or one million six hundred thousand). Since 2001 it has launched a rural health insurance scheme, covering around one hundred thousand households.

=== During the financial year, April 1, 2008 to 31 March 2009, the outreach was as under - ===
- The villagelevel health workers of TF treated 639,672 patients for 32 common diseases and conditions.
- 700 TB patients were under the care of trained certified Village Health Worker (VHW) DOT providers
- Mother Healthcare Program
- Urine Pregnancy Tests done – 11,895
- New pregnancies registered – 39,934 - 55% registered in first trimester
- No. of visits to regd. pregnant women – 89,403
- Referrals for High-risk pregnancies - 3,992
- Total deliveries registered – 36,294 – 80% deliveries in hospital
- Lactating mothers provided counseling – 27,094
- Family planning services provided in field – 23,094

=== Child Healthcare Program ===
- At birth Male:Female ratio noted in this area – 54:46
- Low Birth Weight less than 2.5 kg babies noted – 11%
- Colostrum Feeding in 3 hours of birth – 74%
- Newborn put on KMC - 524
- Bath to newborn after 7 days – 15%
- Neo natal Mortality Rate (NMR) – 25
- Gr III–IV undernourished children < 1 yr – 4%
- Participation of TF in Mamta Divas (MCH-vaccination sessions in RCH) – 10,001 events Average ANC/session - 7, Children/session - 13

=== Cancer Awareness Program ===
- Households visited for survey – 1,59,511
- Persons contacted – 7,32,365
- Population found addicted – 40%
- Persons motivated for de-addiction – 3,379
- “High risk for cancer” persons referred to hospital – 4,622
- Confirmed new cancer patients - 468
- Cancer patients followed in field – 2,938
- Patients completed treatment - 77
- Cancer Awareness Meetings held – 16,176
- Cancer diagnosis camps held 5 - 738 patients attended

=== Health Camps organized in 65 villages ===
- Viewers of health exhibition in 65 villages– 8,804
- Anti-rabies vaccine doses provided – 2,998
- Anti-Hepatitis B Vaccine doses – 67,334
- Family Planning operations – 670, IUDs – 3
- 1,664 employees of 422 village milk cooperative societies of AMUL provided health check up services.

416 Annual General Body Meetings of village milk cooperatives attended

- Disposable Delivery Kit (DDK)Unit
- DDKs manufactured – 23,892
- DDKs distributed – 22,160

From March 2009, TF has tied up with Sankara Eyecare Institute's Anand Hospital for eyecare in 7 blocks - to eradicate preventable blindness . From March 9 to mid-Sept 09, the Sankara-TF joint efforts have reached around 1100 people - who have been provided COMPLETELY FREE eye surgeries, mostly for senile cataract. Training inputs have been provided to all village health workers of TF.

TF has also been enlisted to provide training to members of Village Health and Sanitation Committees of Village Gram Panchayats of all the villages of Umreth, Anklav and Anand talukas of Anand District and Balasinor and Virpur talukas of Kheda District during the financial year 08-09. The Gujarat state government has provided grants for this project of around Rs.1100,000 (eleven lakhs or one million one hundred thousand rupees).

Apart from community health, TF also has programs for children, (Balwadi program) and for livelihood enhancement of women (handicrafts). TF also has organised anti tobacco campaigns in its program villages.

The Chairperson of the National Dairy Development Board, Dr.(Ms) Amrita Patel assessed the organisation thus in an international workshop " Tribhuvandas Foundation, which is Asia's largest NGO, works in over 600 villages in the State in the field of maternal and infant care. What is unique about the programme of the Foundation is that it rides on the back of milk. It is the village milk co-operative that appoints a village health worker and pays an honorarium to the village health worker to undertake the work. So it is milk paying for health."

== Academic resources ==
- The national medical journal of India, Volume 16, No.2, 2003 pages 79–89.
- The National Dairy Board: prepaid health services through an agriculture cooperative in India.

Author: Halse M. Source: In: National Council for International Health [NCIH], Cooperative League of the US, Group Health Association of America. Alternative health delivery systems: can they serve the public interest in Third World settings? Occasional papers. Washington, D.C. NCIH, 1984 Aug. :7-11. Document number 026323.*
