= Kerala model =

Developmental model adopted in Kerala

The Human Development Index of various Indian States as of 2006 (prepared by United Nations Development Programme).

The Kerala model refers to the practices adopted by the Indian state of Kerala to further human development. It is characterised by results showing strong social indicators when compared to the rest of the country, such as high literacy and life expectancy rates, highly improved access to healthcare, and low infant mortality and birth rates. Despite having a lower per capita income, the state is sometimes compared to developed countries. These achievements along with the factors responsible for such achievements have been considered characteristic results of the Kerala model.

Academic literature discusses the primary factors underlying the success of the Kerala model as its decentralization efforts, the political mobilization of the poor, and the active involvement of civil society organizations in the planning and implementation of development policies.

More precisely, the Kerala model has been defined as:

- A set of high material quality of life indicators coinciding with low per-capita incomes, both distributed across nearly the entire population of Kerala.
- A set of wealth and resource redistribution programmes that have largely brought about the high material quality-of-life indicators.
- High levels of political participation and activism among ordinary people along with substantial numbers of dedicated leaders at all levels. Kerala's mass activism and committed cadre are able to function within a large democratic structure, which their activism has served to reinforce.

== History ==
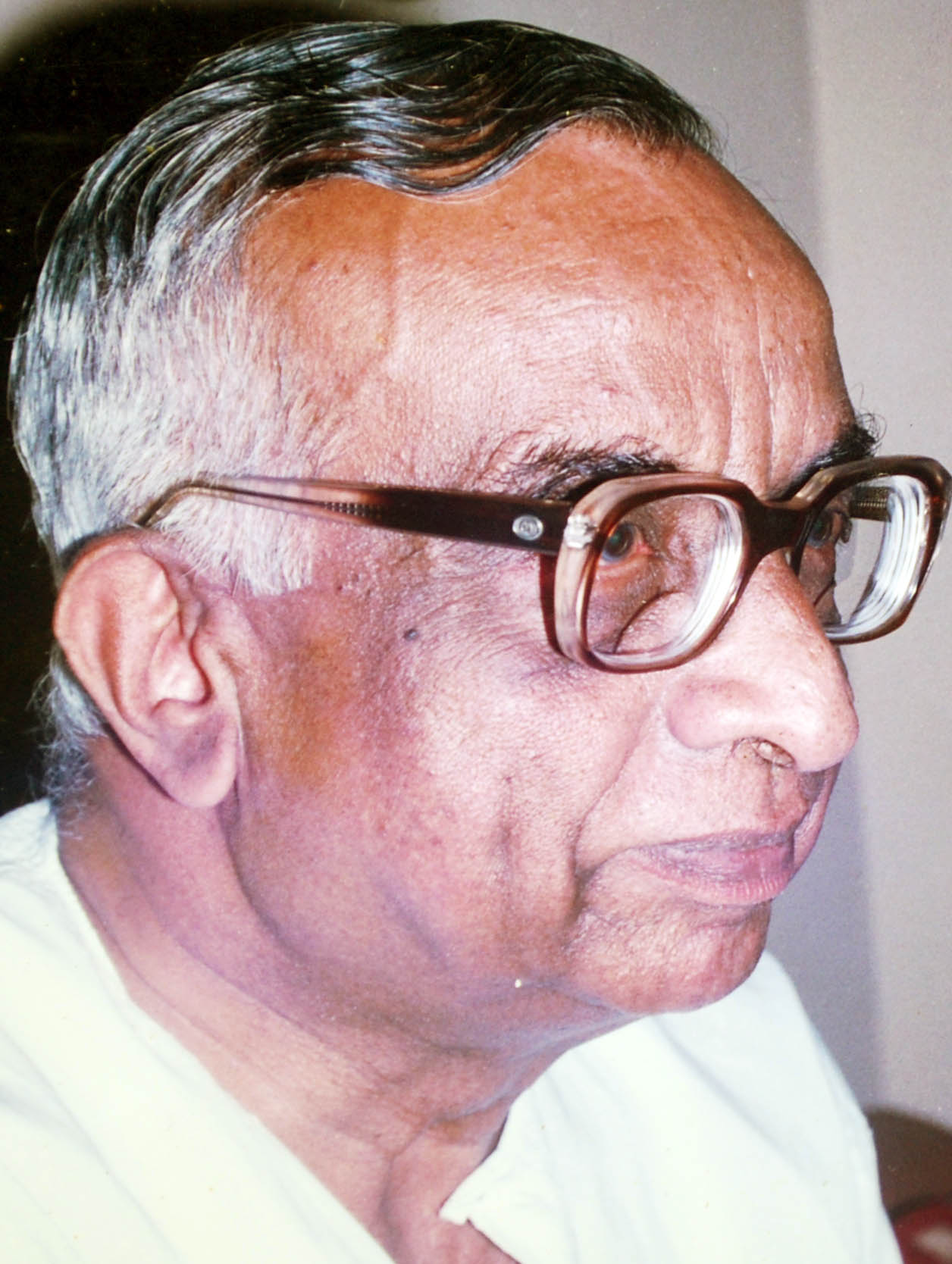
Research done by economist K. N. Raj played a pivotal role in the model's development.

The Kerala model originally differed from conventional development thinking which focuses on achieving high GDP growth rates, however, in 1990, Pakistani economist Mahbub ul Haq changed the focus of development economics from national income accounting to people centered policies. To produce the Human Development Report (HDRs), Haq brought together a group of well-known development economists including: Paul Streeten, Frances Stewart, Gustav Ranis, Keith Griffin, Sudhir Anand, and Meghnad Desai.

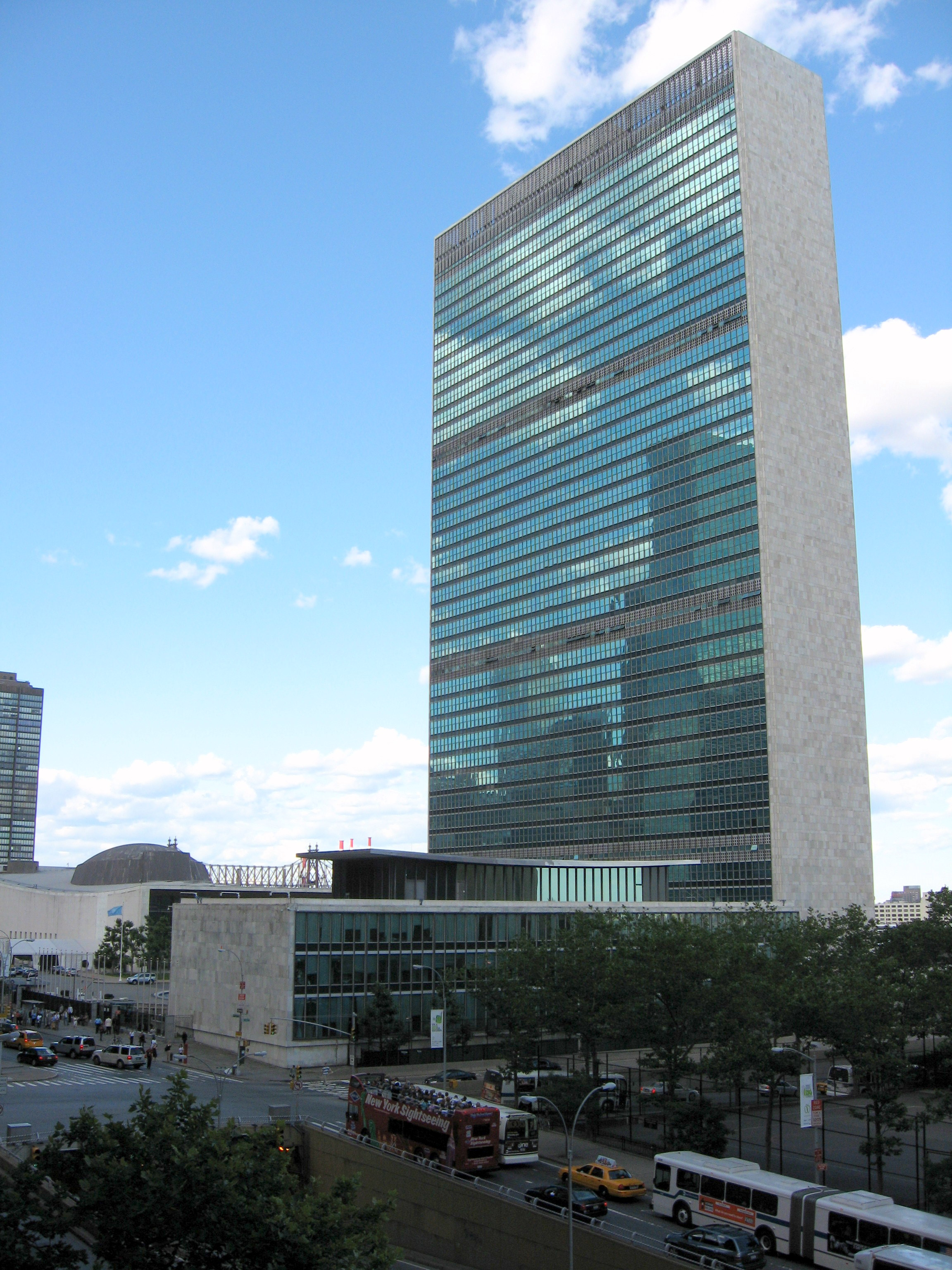
The Human Development Index, which was introduced by the United Nations Development Programme (a branch of the United Nations Organisation), has become one of the most influential and widely used indices to measure human development across countries.

Economists have noted that despite low income rates, the state had high literacy rates, healthy citizens, and a politically active population. Researchers began to delve more deeply into what was going in the Kerala model, since human development indices seemed to show a standard of living which was comparable with life in developed nations, on a fraction of the income. The development standard in Kerala is comparable to that of many first world nations and is widely considered to be the highest in India at that time. However, the state's total debt has surged by 80% in five years, government plans to halve its plan size for 2024-25 budget.

== Human Development Index ==
The United Nations developed the Human Development Index (HDI) in 1990 as a composite statistic used to rank countries by level of "human development" and separate developed (high development), developing (middle development), and underdeveloped (low development) countries. The HDI is used in the United Nations Development Programme's annual Human Development Reports and is composed from data on life expectancy, education and per-capita GDP (as an indicator of Standard of living) collected at the national level using a formula. This index, which has become one of the most influential and widely used indices to compare human development across countries, gave the Kerala model international recognition since Kerala has consistently had scores comparable to developed countries since the HDI's inception.

In 2022, Kerala again tops the HDI among the major Indian states with a score of 0.758, according to the Global Data Lab.

== Public health ==
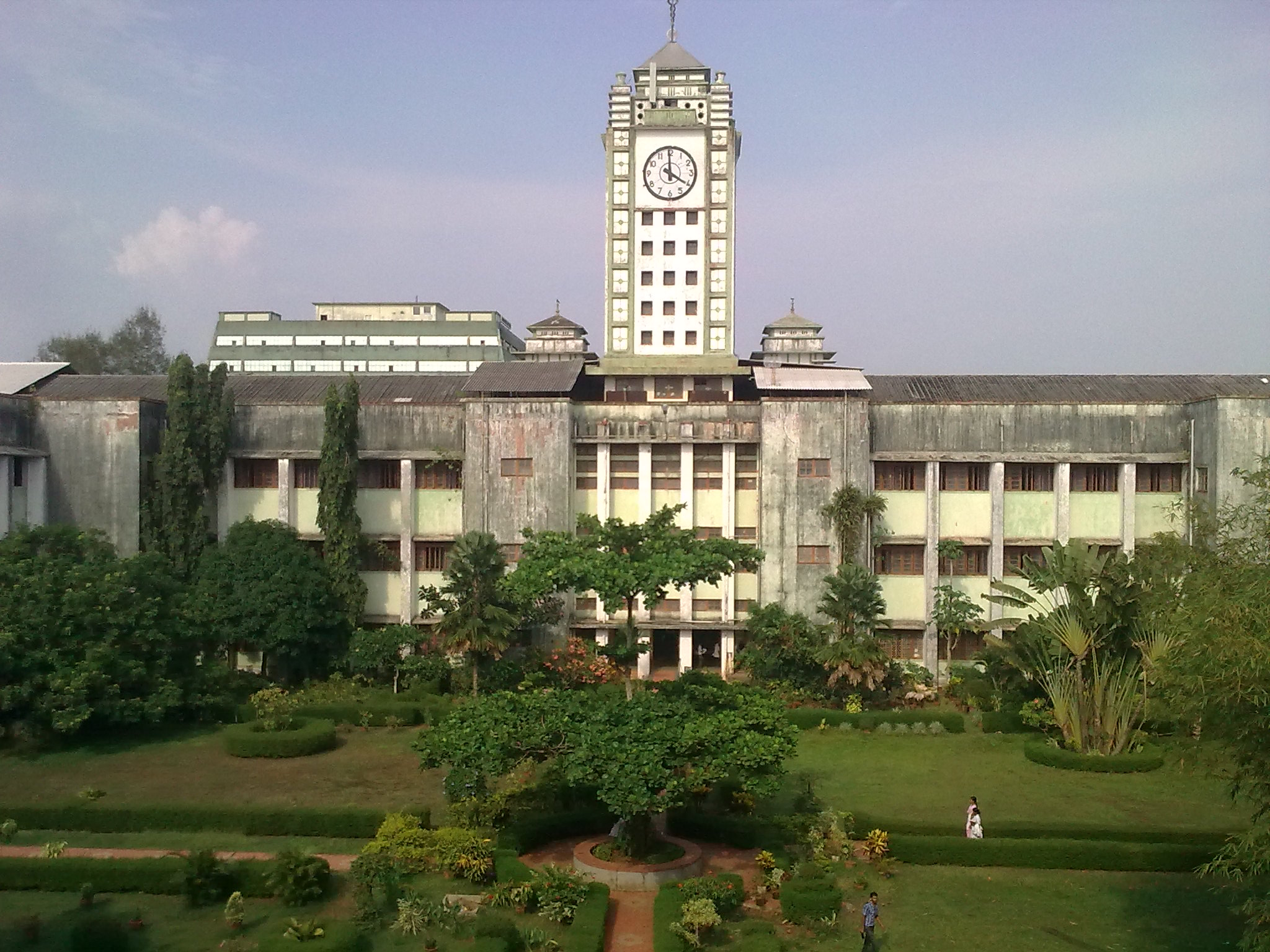
Calicut Medical College in Kozhikode. Kerala has around 9,491 government and private medical institutions in the state, with a Population Bed ratio of 879, one of the highest in the country.

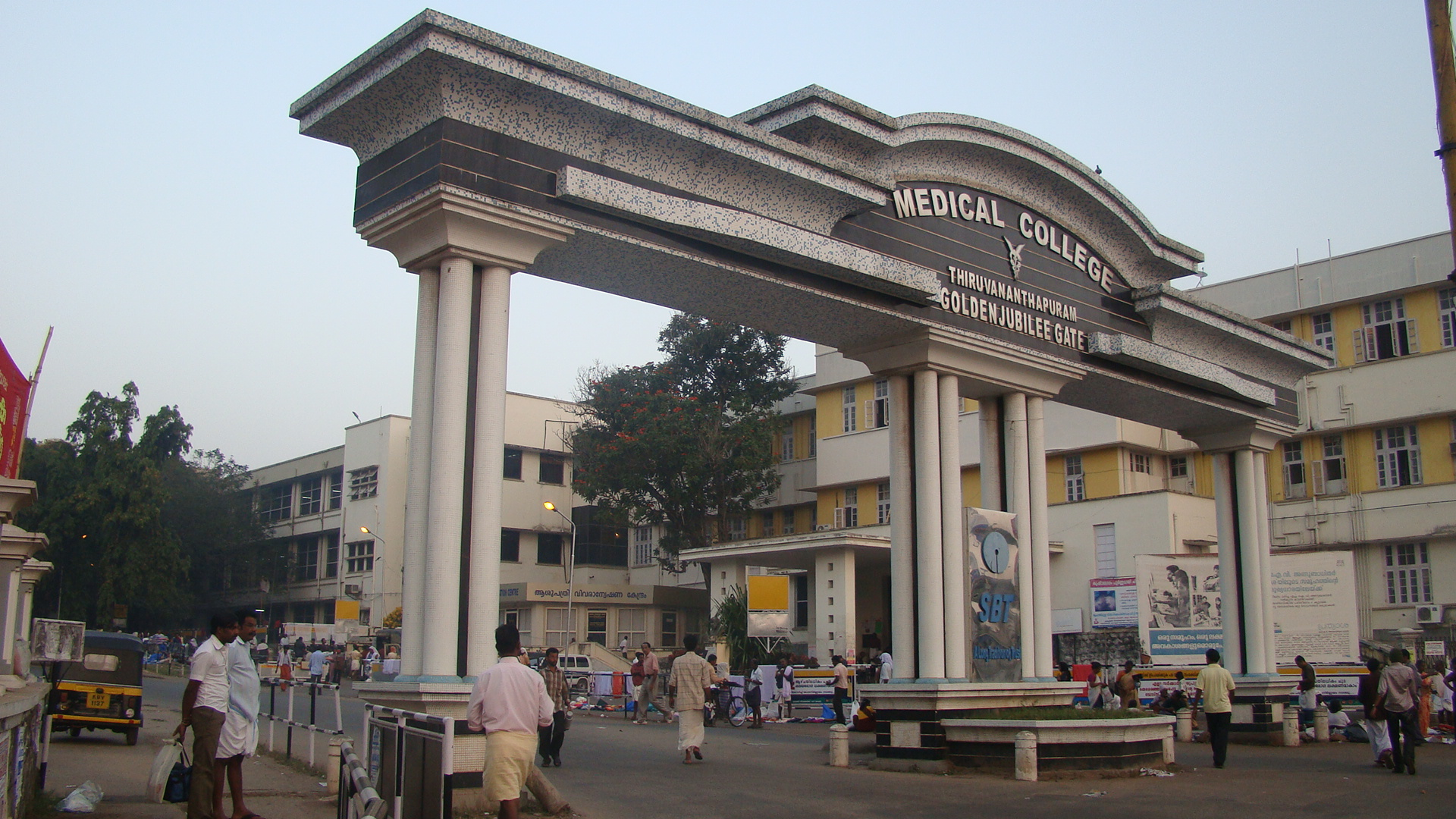
Government Medical College, Thiruvananthapuram. Founded in 1951, it is the oldest Medical College in Kerala and one of the largest tertiary care hospitals in the state. During the 1950s Asian flu pandemic, it was the principal institute to isolate and research the virus.

=== History ===
Kerala's improved public health relative to other Indian states and countries with similar economic circumstances is founded on a long history of successful health-focused policies.

One of the first key strategies Kerala implemented was making vaccinations mandatory for public servants, prisoners, and students in 1879 prior to Kerala becoming a state, when it was composed of autonomous territories. Moreover, the efforts of missionaries in setting up hospitals and schools in underserved areas increased access to health and education services. Though class and caste divisions were rigid and oppressive, a rise in subnationalism in the 1890s resulted in the development of a shared identity across class and caste groups and support for public welfare. Simultaneously, the growth in agriculture and trade in Kerala also stimulated government investment in transportation infrastructure. Thus, leaders in Kerala began increasing spending on health, education, and public transportation, establishing progressive social policies. By the 1950s, Kerala had a significantly higher life expectancy than neighboring states as well as the highest literacy rate in India.

Once Kerala became a state in 1956, public scrutiny of schools and health care facilities continued to increase, along with residents' literacy and awareness of the necessity of access health services. Gradually, health and education became top priorities, which was unique to Kerala according to a local public health researcher. The state's high minimum wages, road expansion, strong trade and labor unions, land reforms, and investment in clean water, sanitation, housing, access to food, public health infrastructure, and education all contributed to the relative success of Kerala's public health system. In fact, declining mortality rates during this time period doubled the state's population, and immunization services, infectious disease care, health awareness activities, and antenatal and postnatal services became more widely available. In the 1970s, a decade before India initiated its national immunization program with WHO, Kerala launched an immunization program for infants and pregnant women. In addition, smaller private medical institutions complemented the government's efforts to increase access to health services and provided specialized healthcare. As a result, life expectancy continued to increase in Kerala, though household income remained low. Thus, the concept of the "Kerala model" was coined by development researchers in Kerala in the 1970s and the state received international recognition for its health outcomes despite a relatively low per capita income.

In the mid-1970s to the early 1990s, a fiscal crisis caused the government to reduce spending on health and other social services. Reductions in federal health spending also affected Kerala's health budget. As a result, the quality and abilities of public healthcare facilities declined and residents protested. Eventually, private health services began to take over, enabled by a lack of government regulation. In fact, by the mid-1980s, only 23% of households regularly utilized government health services, and from 1986 to 1996, private-sector growth significantly surpassed public-sector growth.

In 1996, Kerala began to decentralize public healthcare facilities and fiscal responsibilities to local self-governments by implementing the People's Campaign for Decentralized Planning in response to public distrust and national recommendations. For instance, new budgetary allocations gave local governments control of 35 to 40% of the state budget. Moreover, the campaign emphasized improving care and access, regardless of income level, caste, tribe, or gender, reflecting a goal of not just effective but also equitable coverage. A three-tier system of self-governance was established, consisting of 900 panchayats (villages), 152 blocks, and 14 districts. The current healthcare system arose from local self-governments supporting the construction of sub-centers, primary health centers that support five to six sub-centers and serve a village, and community health centers. The new system also allowed local self-governments to create hospital management committees and purchase necessary equipment.

=== Present ===
The basis for the state's health standards is the state-wide infrastructure of primary health centers. Under the current system, the primary health centers and sub-centers were brought under the jurisdiction of local self-governments to respond to local health needs and work more closely with local communities. As a result, health outcomes and access to healthcare services have improved. There are over 9,491 government and private medical institutions in the state, which have about 38000 beds for the total population, making the population to bed ratio 879—one of the highest in the country.

There is an active, state-supported nutrition programme for pregnant and new mothers and about 99% of child births are institutional/hospital deliveries, leading to infant mortality in 2018 being 7 per thousand, compared to 28 in India, overall and 18.9 for low- middle income countries generally. The birth rate is 40 percent below that of the national average and almost 60 percent below the rate for impoverished countries in general. Kerala's birth rate is 14.1 (per 1,000 people) and decreasing. India's rate is 17 the rate of the U.S. is 11.4. Life expectancy at birth in Kerala is 77 years, compared to 70 years in India and 84 years in Japan, one of the highest in the world. Female life expectancy in Kerala exceeds that of the male, similar to that in developed countries. Kerala's maternal mortality ratio is the lowest in India at 53 deaths per 100,000 live births.

According to the India State Hunger Index, in 2009, Kerala was one of the four states where hunger was only moderate. The hunger index score of Kerala was 17.66 and was second only to Punjab, the state with the lowest hunger index. The nationwide hunger index of India was 23.31. Despite the fact that Kerala has a relatively low dietary intake of 2,200 kilocalories per day, the infant-mortality rate and the percentage of the population facing severe undernutrition in Kerala is far lower than in other Indian states. In early 2000, more than a quarter of the population faced severe undernutrition in three states—Orissa, Uttar Pradesh, and Madhya Pradesh—though they had a higher average dietary intake than Kerala. Kerala's improved nutrition is primarily due to better healthcare access as well as greater equality in food distribution across different income groups and within families.

Public Health Infrastructure
Medical Colleges	34
Hospitals	1280
Community Health Centres	229
Primary Health Centres	933
Sub Centres	5380
AYUSH Hospitals/Dispensary	162/1473
Total Beds	38004
Blood Banks	169

District-wise Hospital Bed Population Ratio as per the 2011

District	Population Census(2011)	Number of beds	Population Bed Ratio
Alappuzha	2127789	3424	621
Ernakulam	3282388	4544	722
Idukki	1108974	1096	1012
Kannur	2523003	2990	844
Kasaragod	1307375	1087	1203
Kollam	2635375	2388	1104
Kottayam	1974551	2817	701
Kozhikode	3086293	2820	1094
Malappuram	4112920	2503	1643
Palakkad	2809934	2622	1072
Pathanamthitta	1197412	1948	615
Thiruvananthapuram	3301427	4879	677
Thrissur	3121200	3519	887
Wayanad	817420	1367	598
Total	33406061	38004	879

The Health Index, ranking the performance of the States and the Union Territories in India in Health sector, published in June 2019 by the NITI Ayong, Ministry of Health and Family Welfare, Government of India and The World Bank has Kerala on top with an overall score of 74.01.Kerala has already achieved the SDG 2030 targets for Neonatal Mortality Rate, Infant Mortality Rate, Under-5 Mortality rate and Maternal Mortality Ratio.

The Economist has recognized the Kerala government for providing palliative care policy (it is the only Indian state with such a policy) and funding for community-based care programmes. Kerala pioneered universal health care through extensive public health services. Hans Rosling also highlighted this when he said Kerala matches U.S. in health but not in economy and took the example of Washington, D.C. which is much richer but less healthy compared to Kerala.

Key Health Development indicators- Kerala & India

Health Indicators	Kerala	India
Life expectancy at birth (Male)	74.39	69.51
Life expectancy at birth (Female)	79.98	72.09
Life expectancy at birth (Average)	77.28	70.77
Birth rate (per 1,000 population)	14.1	17.64
Death rate (per 1,000 population)	7.47	7.26
Infant mortality rate (per 1,000 population)	7	28
Under 5-Mortality rate(per 1,000 live births)	10	36
Maternal mortality ratio (per lakh live births)	53.49	178.35

Other Key SDG 3 Indicators
Indicators	2020	2019
Children in the age group 9–11 months Immunised(%)	92	
Notification rate of Tuberculosis per 1,00,000 population	75	71
HIV Incidence per 1,000 uninfected population	0.02	0.03
Suicide rate (per 1,00,000 population)	24.30	
Death rate due to road accidents per 1,00,000 population	12.42	
Institutional deliveries out of the total deliveries reported (%)	99.90	74
Monthly per capita out-of-pocket expenditure on health (%)	17	
Physicians, nurses and midwives per 10,000 population	115	112

== Education ==
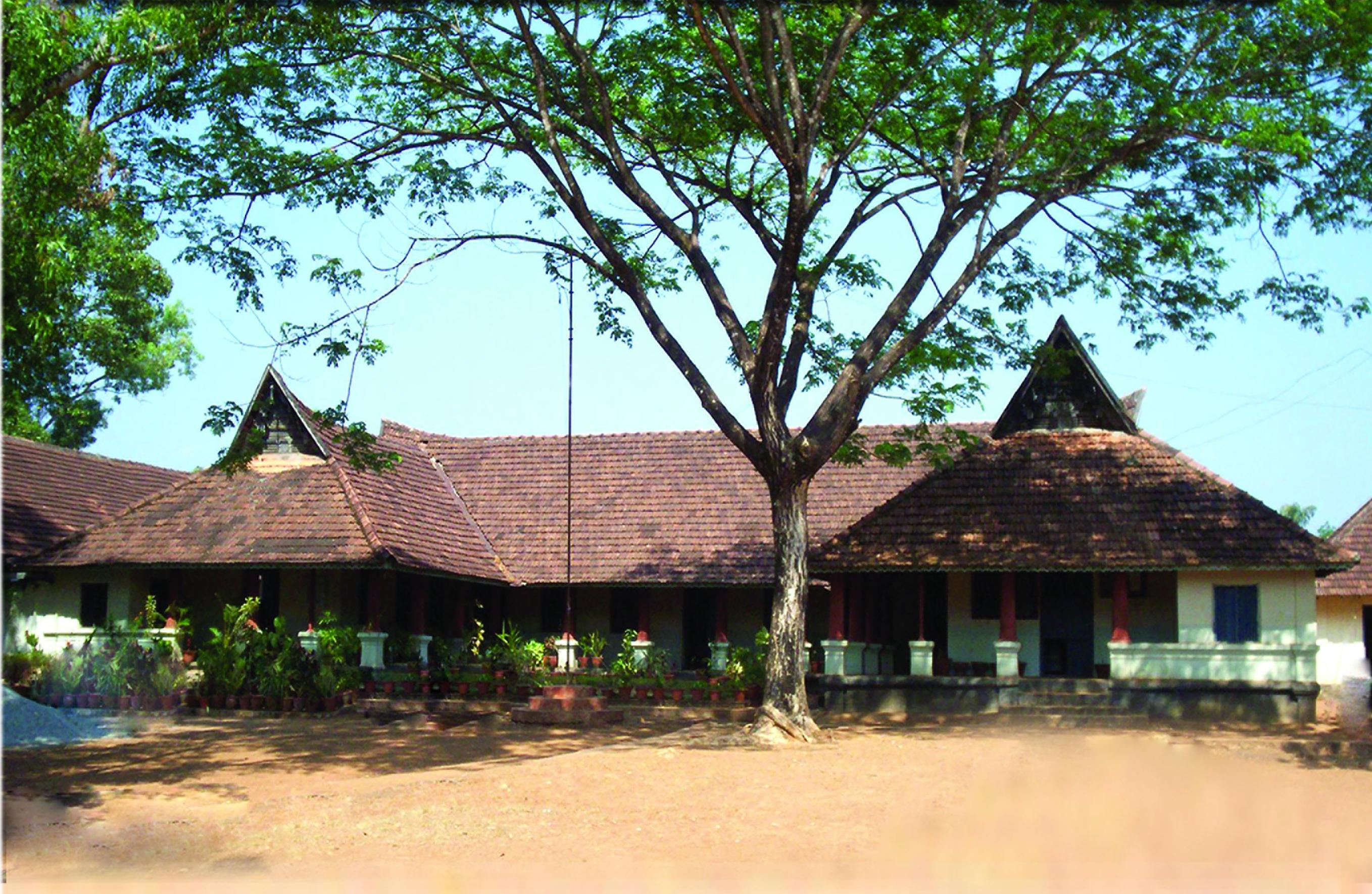
A government school in Kottarakara

Pallikkoodam, a school model started by Buddhists was prevalent in the Malabar region, Kingdom of Cochin, and Kingdom of Travancore. This model was later acquired by Christian missionaries and paved the way for an educational revolution in Kerala by making education accessible to all, irrespective of caste or religion. Christian missionaries introduced Western education methods to Kerala. Communities such as Ezhavas, Nairs and Dalits were guided by monastic orders (called ashrams) and Hindu saints and social reformers such as Sree Narayana Guru, Sree Chattampi Swamikal and Ayyankali, who exhorted them to educate themselves by starting their own schools. That resulted in numerous Sree Narayana schools and colleges, Nair Service Society schools. The teachings of these saints have also empowered the poor and backward classes to organize themselves and bargain for their rights. The Government of Kerala instituted the Aided School system to help schools with operating expenses such as salaries for running these schools.

Kerala had been a notable centre of Vedic learning, having produced one of the most influential Hindu philosophers, Adi Shankaracharya. The Vedic learning of the Nambudiris is an unaltered tradition that still holds today, and is unique for its orthodoxy, unknown to other Indian communities. However, in feudal Kerala, though only the Nambudiris received an education in Vedas, other castes as well as women were open to receive education in Sanskrit, mathematics and astronomy, in contrast to other parts of India. Tirunavaya was a centre of Vedic learning in early medieval period. Ponnani in Kerala was a global centre of Islamic learning during the medieval period.

The upper castes, such as Nairs, Tamil Brahmin, Ambalavasis, St Thomas Christians, as well as lower castes such as Ezhavas had a strong history of Sanskrit learning. In fact, many Ayurvedic physicians (such as Itty Achudan) were from the lower-caste Ezhava community and Muslim community (such as the father of renowned Mappila Paattu poet Moyinkutty Vaidyar). Vaidyaratnam P. S. Warrier was a prominent Ayurvedic physician. This level of learning by lower-caste people was not seen in other parts of India. Also, Kerala had been the site of the notable Kerala School which pioneered principles of mathematics and logic, and cemented Kerala's status as a place of learning.

The prevalence of education was not only restricted to males. In pre-colonial Kerala, women, especially those belonging to the matrilineal Nair caste, received an education in Sanskrit and other sciences, as well as Kalaripayattu, a martial art. This was unique to Kerala, but was facilitated by the inherent equality shown by Kerala society to females and males, since Kerala society was largely matrilineal, as opposed to the rigid patriarchy in other parts of India which led to a loss of women's rights.

The rulers of the princely state of Travancore also were at the forefront in the spread of education. A school for girls was established by the Maharaja in 1859, which was an act unprecedented in the Indian subcontinent. In colonial times, Kerala exhibited little defiance against the British Raj. However, they had mass protests for social causes such as rights for "untouchables" and education for all. Popular protest to hold public officials accountable is a vital part of life in Kerala.

=== 1880–1947: Travancore State Reforms ===
The princely state of Travancore led a series of landmark educational reforms under the enlightened rule of Maharajas Visakham Thirunal Rama Varma and Moolam Thirunal Rama Varma. A school for girls was established by the Maharaja in 1859, which was an act unprecedented in the Indian subcontinent. In colonial times, Kerala exhibited little defiance against the British Raj. However, they had mass protests for social causes such as rights for "untouchables" and education for all. Popular protest to hold public officials accountable is a vital part of life in Kerala. These state-driven reforms complemented the missionary efforts and created a robust educational infrastructure, helping Kerala emerge as one of the most literate regions in colonial India.

Key initiatives during this period included:

- Introduction of the grants-in-aid system to provide financial support to private and mission-run schools.
- Implementation of free primary education for socially and economically backward classes.
- Establishment of scholarships for foreign study, enabling meritorious students from Kerala to pursue higher education abroad.
- Founding of major educational institutions such as:
  - Victoria Medical School, which laid the foundation for modern medical education in Kerala.
  - Sanskrit College, promoting classical education among upper-caste and Brahmin students.
  - Schools dedicated to the education of girls and the reform of juveniles, ensuring inclusion and rehabilitation.
- Promotion of technical and vocational education to meet the industrial and administrative needs of a modernizing state.
- Systematic categorization of schools into primary, upper primary, secondary, and collegiate levels, ensuring structured progression in education.

The following table shows the literacy rate of Kerala from 1951 to 2011, measured every decade:

Year	Literacy	Male	Female	Transgender/ Non-binary
1951	47.18	58.35	36.43	
1961	55.08	64.89	45.56	
1971	69.75	77.13	62.53	
1981	78.85	84.56	73.36	
1991	89.81	93.62	86.17	
2001	90.92	94.20	87.86	
2011	94.59	97.10	92.12	84.61

The Kerala State Literacy Mission Authority (KSLMA) had set up "continuing education programmes for transgenders" (Samanwaya) to educate transgender people in Kerala who are ostracised by their family and society and "forced to go out of homes as they are harassed in schools, colleges and in society". The Social Justice Department of Kerala has various welfare programmes for transgender people like Yatnam which provides financial assistance for transgender students preparing for competitive exams, Varnam for distance education programmes, there are also other financial assistant programmes for hostel facility etc. Although these policies help some of the transgender people positively they still face disproportionate amount of discrimination in their daily life which makes it harder for these policies to have a meaningful impact on the transgender community.

== Gender ==
Kerala has the highest score on the Gender Development index in India, as demonstrated by the relatively high literacy rate, sex ratio, and mean age at marriage for women, as well as low fertility and infant mortality rates compared to the rest of the country. In fact, women in Kerala have played a crucial role in increasing the state's literacy rates, with the mobilization of educated, unemployed women making up two-thirds of volunteer teachers involved in the literacy drive during a 1990 campaign to eliminate illiteracy. The literacy gap between males and females in India is lowest in Kerala, with the female literacy rate just 5% lower than that of males. Moreover, as of 2021, the life expectancy for females is 79.98 years in Kerala compared to 72.09 years in India as a whole. The infant mortality rate is 7 per 1,000 live births in Kerala, as opposed to 28 in India. Another indicator of gender equality and women's health is the maternal mortality rate, which is 53.59 per 100,000 live births in Kerala and 178.35 in the rest of India.

Historically, women in Kerala are thought to have possessed more autonomy relative to other Indian states, which is often attributed to its matrilineal structure which ultimately changed into a patrilineal system in the 20th century. Matriliny, in which property was inherited collectively through the female line, was largely practiced by the Hindu Nair caste as well as some other upper-caste Hindus such as the Ezhavas and even some Muslims, who are exclusively patriarchal in other parts of India. However, Christian succession laws in the early 20th century in Kerala were severely restrictive against women. For instance, unmarried daughters could only claim between a quarter and a third of each son's share of paternal property, or 5,000 rupees, whichever was less, if the father died without making a will. In all other instances, daughters' inheritances were restricted to dowries. These laws were challenged when Mary Roy, a Syrian Christian woman who had not received a dowry sued her brother to gain equal access to their inheritance. She ultimately won the case and it was considered a landmark ruling for female succession. Beginning in the 1920s, the Hindu matriarchal system fragmented, especially once the Travancore Nayar Regulation Act of 1925 was passed, which was initiated by the British and began the transition to a strictly patriarchal structure. By the 1970s, the matrilineal system had virtually disappeared and the Kerala family organization became exclusively patrilineal and women's rights to property were significantly restricted.

Though women in Kerala are highly educated, recent studies have called attention to the "gender paradox" in Kerala, in which despite the literacy and education of women in Kerala, they are still oppressed in similar or greater regards by the patriarchy relative to other Indian states. Societal and cultural norms are argued by scholars to continue to restrict women's freedoms and maintain their subservience to men both at home and in the labor market. High female unemployment rates, discrimination in the labor market, and elevated female suicide rates and gender-based violence, are all indicators of the "gender paradox" in Kerala. In addition, the persistence of the long-standing tradition of dowry across lines of caste, class, and religion, and the finding that women do about twenty times as much housework as men in Kerala suggest the restricted autonomy and oppression that Kerala women continue to face. Furthermore, economic participation and involvement of women is declining in Kerala, and male casual laborers receive almost double that of women. However, some policies such as the Mahatma Gandhi National Rural Employment Guarantee Scheme (MGNREGS) and Kudumbashree microenterprises have promoted female entrepreneurship, encouraged women's economic empowerment, and decreased gender disparities in Kerala, according to academic literature analyzing gender sensitive policies.

== State policy ==
In 1957 Kerala elected a communist government headed by EMS Namboothiripad, introduced the revolutionary Land Reform Ordinance. The land reform was implemented by the subsequent government, which had abolished tenancy, benefiting 1.5 million poor households. This achievement was the result of decades of struggle by Kerala's peasant associations. In 1967 in his second term as Chief Minister, EMS again pushed for reform. The land reform initiative abolished tenancy and landlord exploitation, effective public food distribution that provides subsidised rice to low-income households, protective laws for agricultural workers, pensions for retired agricultural laborers, and a high rate of government employment for members of formerly lower-caste communities.

India is a multinational state home to provincial states with differing policies, and Kerala's place within this federalist system can be seen through analyses of its regime type. Two coalitions containing all-India parties have alternately been in power in Kerala—not dissimilar to the neighboring South Indian state of Andhra Pradesh. Kerala has a strong leftist movement presence that has contributed to changes in the traditional feudal-caste system in India. Democratization of the state has surrounded significant increases in components of welfare and has led to a large social transformation since the early 20th century.

Kerala and Tamil Nadu have comparable increases in social development, albeit with Kerala to a much higher degree—yet Tamil Nadu has been ruled by Tamil nationalist parties for over half a century. In comparison, West Bengal is seen as even stronger in terms of Leftist movement and governmental policy compared to Kerala yet is ranked far lower in disparities in rural areas, urban areas, scheduled castes, and scheduled tribes. Further, there is hardly any per capita consumption expenditure and literacy levels between Muslims and Hindus in Kerala—while Tamil Nadu, West Bengal, and the country as a whole have relatively high levels of disparities among the two predominant religious groups.

Interestingly enough, those political radicals involved in the original social integration movements in Kerala were politically conservative. Nonetheless, the social discrimination due to caste of the early 20th century contributed to the cultural revolt and political mobilization of depressed castes. It was the success of these movements that allowed for the creation of Leftist movements that elevates the social status of lower classes as a whole.

== Gaps in the Kerala Model ==
=== Residual inequality ===
Kerala has had consistently high levels of development when compared to the rest of the country. The state has the highest record of per capita consumer expenditure, and this level has been progressively increasing since 1993. Kerala has now begun a high growth regime driven mainly by its service and construction industries. The all-India and statewise trend in the estimates of poverty headcount ratio (HCR) and Gini coefficient show that Kerala reduced its HCR by 10.3% between 1988-1993 and then again by another 12.2% in the 11 years proceeding until 2004–2005. Comparatively, Himachal Pradesh—which did not benefit from the same Gulf boom that Kerala did—reduced its post-reform rural poverty to a lower HCR of 10.9% in 2004–05. Moreover, though there was a marginal decline in the Gini coefficient for rural Kerala in 1993-1994 compared to previous years, there is a jump to 38.3% in 2004-2005—the highest figure compared to all-India figures and all other states. The urban Gini coefficient for Kerala in 2004-05 was 41%, second only to Chhattisgarh. Comparisons of scheduled tribes, castes, and religions also show growing income disparities, reflected by increasing incidence of suicides, family violence, gang activity, and alcoholism, among others.

Even public provisioning of equitable access to healthcare and education, which are the foundation of the Kerala model, have decreased overall. The percentage of public spending on education to total government expenditure decreased from 29.28% in 1982–83 to 23.17% 1992-93 and 17.97% in 2005–06. In terms of education, the educational expenditure size of 6% which Kerala followed in the 1960s and 70s declined to just over 4% in the 1980s and below that in 11 of the 16 years during the post-reform regime. While decline of public expenditure on education decreased during the pre-reform period (from 1980 to 1991) at a rate of 0.97% yearly, the post-reform period has seen an even sharper decline of 2.13% a year. With regard to public expenditure on health and family welfare, there too has been an equally sharp fall in spending, from 11.67% of state domestic product (SDP) to 1983–84 to 9.94% in 1989-90 and down to 6.36% in 2005–06. Social security entitlements as a percentage of SDP fell significantly too, while it was increasing at a rate of 1.83% in the pre-reform period it fell to 0.15% during the reform period. Under the current neoliberal regime there has been accelerated commercialization of the education and health sectors—which has altered the equity base of the Kerala model as a whole. For example, the proportion of students at private unaided schools rose from 2.5% of the 5.9 million total student population in 1990–91 to 7.4% in 2005-06. This is coupled with a 7.5% of intake in government schools over the same time, and only those with the means to pay high fees can go to these private unaided schools.

The marine fishery sector in Kerala is an example of the extent to which disparities still exist despite the Kerala Model's emphasis placed on equality. Though fish and fisheries have a very significant place within Kerala as a whole, fishing communities in Kerala have not benefited from state's overall efforts at improving quality of life nor the increased value of output in the sector. Data from 1965 to 1975 indicate an eleven-fold increase in the value of output from Rs 68.5 million to 741.4 million in current prices. However, a major deceleration in the rate of increase of value of output is observed from 1975 to 1985 where the level grew from Rs 741.4 million to just Rs 906.4 million as a result of declining fish harvests and prices. While the net state domestic product has increased by about 18% in the same decade, the fishery sector product has decreased by 20% in comparison. This can be seen in the 29% increase in the gap between per capita state domestic product and product per fisherperson between 1975–76 and 1984–85. Poverty is also prevalent in marine fishing communities that are often located on the geographical margins of the land who depend exclusive on the sea for their livelihood. These and other communities on the fringe of state borders have been left behind in the economic and socio-cultural progress that has been widely witnessed by the rest of the state. Poor quality of life and substandard conditions in marine fishing communities can be attributed specifically to the crowding of entire groups of people on the narrow strip of line along the length of Kerala's coastline: a total of 222 fishing villages along the state's 590 km coastline—none more than a half kilometer wide. Population density in marine fishing villages was measured to be around 2113 persons per square kilometer in 1981, compared to a state figure of 655 per square kilometer. Basic amenities such as electric lighting, access to running water, toilet facilities, etc. are also at far lower standards in these fishing villages when compared to the state as a whole. The lack of basic facilities and hygiene has led to rapid spread of contagious diseases in these areas which express high levels of respiratory and skin infections, diarrheal disorders and hook worm infections to state a few. Though the all-Kerala infant mortality rate was 17 per 1000 live births in 1991, the corresponding rate is 85 per 1000 births in marine fishing communities. There is also a clear gender bias evidenced by the sex ratio of 972 females to 1000 males in these communities, compared to the all-Kerala 1084:1000 ratio of females to males. Thus, marine fishing communities clearly represent an outlier community that has faced restricted levels of capabilities while the state of Kerala has seen progress overall.

=== Job opportunities and brain drain ===
Despite having high standards of human development, the Kerala model ranks low in terms of industrial and economic development. The high rate of education combined with a small job market in the region has resulted in a brain drain, with many citizens migrating to other parts of the world, especially the Gulf States, for employment. A spike of young educated workers emigrating from Kerala occurred in the 1990s. The Kerala State Industrial Development Corporation attempted to reverse this trend by starting a number of construction projects that will provide 5 million jobs in 2011. In 2023, there was a significant decrease in net migration to the Gulf States due to the worsening job market in these target countries, with many workers returning to Kerala; many of them were distress returnees. However, the returnees face difficulties in reintegrating with the Kerala job market, as their skills were often not aligned with local needs. Due to financial difficulties, they also tend to accept immediate income over longer-term career growth, so they end up in low-paying jobs.

The net decrease in worker migration has not reduced the overall emigration figure in 2023, however. Part of this is due to an unprecedented rise in students studying abroad, which accounted for 11.3% of the total emigration figure.

== Opinions ==
British Green activist Richard Douthwaite interviewed a person who remembers once saying that "in some societies, very high levels – virtually First World levels – of individual and public health and welfare are achieved at as little as sixtieth of US nominal GDP per capita and used Kerala as an example". Richard Douthwaite states that Kerala "is far more sustainable than anywhere in Europe or North America". Kerala's unusual socioeconomic and demographic situation was summarized by author and environmentalist Bill McKibben:

Kerala, a state in India, is a bizarre anomaly among developing nations, a place that offers real hope for the future of the Third World. Though not much larger than Maryland, Kerala has a population as big as California's and a per capita annual income of less than $3000. But its infant mortality rate is very low, its literacy rate's among the highest on Earth, and its birthrate's below that of America's and falling faster. Kerala's residents live nearly as long as Americans or Europeans. Though mostly a land of paddy-covered plains, statistically Kerala stands out as the Mount Everest of social development; there's truly no place like it.

Kerala continues to lead low-income areas compared to the rest of India. Recent criticisms of the Kerala Model suggest that Kerala is losing its lead within India. K. K. George cites figures indicating that Punjab spends more per capita on education and that both Rajasthan and Punjab spend more per capita on health than Kerala. He also compares Kerala unfavorably with Maharashtra, Haryana, Madhya Pradesh, Nagaland, Rajasthan, and Uttar Pradesh in pension payments to destitutes. These weaknesses should not be overlooked, but they remain minor compared with Kerala's continuing overall ability to deliver a high material quality of life to its people as the indicators show. Oommen and Anandaraj district-level profile (1996) found 9 of Kerala's 14 districts among the top 12 in all of India on a composite of literacy, life expectancy, and several economic variables. Kerala's lowest district of Malappuram was 31st on a list of 372 districts.

Prabhat Patnaik argued that the "liberalisation-cum-structural adjustment package of the Fund and the Bank" presents a philosophy that asserts that the working masses need to make sacrifices today for the sake of providing incentives to capitalists for higher growth, from which those same workers would benefit later. This 'trickle down' effect emphasizes the means augmenting supply-side measures necessary for the success of the Kerala Model. The 'reforms' observed, then, are more of a reflection of the structural changes made by the Indian economy which has increased supply side incentives for capitalists. This has led to a rise in the degree of exploitation of the working people by cutting their so-called social wage and wrecking the internal balance of the production-structure, which should be taken into consideration when looking at the Kerala Model as a worthwhile example for other third world states. To Patnaik, an "important condition [...]for the adoption of a Kerala-type trajectory in any region" is that "the region itself" (or a larger region which contains that smaller region) has "an internally-balanced production-structure where it is self-sufficient in basic necessities". Since Structural adjustments "destroy the internal balance of the production-structure", Patnaik argued that sincere admirers of the Kerala model ought to "oppose the implementation of Fund-Bank-dictated economic 'reforms'[sic]".
