= National Rural Livelihood Mission =

Indian poverty alleviation project

- Country: India
- Prime Minister(s): Manmohan Singh
- Launched: June 2011

The National Rural Livelihood Mission (NRLM) is a poverty alleviation project implemented by the Ministry of Rural Development, a branch of the Government of India. This plan is focused on promoting self-employment and the organization of rural poor. The idea behind this program is to organize the poor into Self Help Groups (SHGs) and make them capable of self-employment. In 1999, after restructuring the Integrated Rural Development Programme (IRDP), the Ministry of Rural Development (MoRD) launched Swarnajayanti Grameen Swarojgar Yojana (SGSY) to focus on promoting self-employment among the rural poor. SGSY is now remodelled to form NRLM, thereby plugging the shortfalls of the SGSY programme. This program was launched in 2011 with a budget of $5.1 billion and is one of the flagship programs of the Ministry of Rural Development. This is one of the world's most prominent initiatives to improve the livelihood of the poor. This program is supported by the World Bank with a credit of $1 Billion. The program was succeeded and renamed by Deen Dayal Antyodaya Yojana on 25 September 2015.

== Background ==
The basic idea behind this project was to form SHGs and help them to start some entrepreneurial activities but later SHG group failed.

== Approach ==
In order to build, support and sustain livelihood of the poor, NRLM will harness their capability and complement them with capacities (information, knowledge, skill, tools, finance and collectivization), so that the poor can deal with the external world. NRLM works on three pillars – enhancing and expanding existing livelihoods options of the poor; building skills for the job market outside; and nurturing self-employed and entrepreneurs.

Dedicated support structures build and strengthen the institutional platforms of the poor. These platforms, with the support of their built-up human and social capital, offer a variety of livelihoods services to their members across the value-chains of key products and services of the poor. These services include financial and capital services, production and productivity enhancement services that include technology, knowledge, skills and inputs, market linkages etc. The interested rural BPL youth would be offered skill development after counseling and matching the aptitude with the job requirements, and placed in jobs that are remunerative. Self-employed and entrepreneurial oriented poor would be provided skills and financial linkages and nurtured to establish and grow with micro-enterprises for products and services in demand. These platforms also offer space for convergence and partnerships with a variety of stakeholders, by building an enabling environment for poor to access their rights and entitlements, public services and innovations. The aggregation of the poor, through their institutions, reduces transaction costs to the individual members, makes their livelihoods more viable and accelerates their journey out of poverty.

NRLM will be implemented in a mission mode. This enables:

(a) shift from the present allocation based strategy to a demand driven strategy, enabling the states to formulate their own livelihoods-based poverty reduction action plans.

(b) focus on targets, outcomes and time bound delivery.

(c) continuous capacity building, imparting requisite skills and creating linkages with livelihoods opportunities for the poor, including those emerging in the organized sector.

(d) monitoring against targets of poverty outcomes.

As NRLM follows a demand driven strategy, the States have the flexibility to develop their own livelihoods-based perspective plans and annual action plans for poverty reduction. The overall plans would be within the allocation for the state based on inter-se poverty ratios.

The second dimension of demand driven strategy implies that the ultimate objective is that the poor will drive the agenda, through participatory planning at grassroots level, implementation of their own plans, reviewing and generating further plans based on their experiences. The plans will not only be demand driven, they will also be dynamic.

== Criticism ==
NRLM is one of the major programs run by Ministry of Rural Development (MoRD). It's believed by some to have serious shortcomings.

1. Prof. Malcolm Harper notes three aspects with regard to using SHG groups:'1) Groups take time, lots of it, and we have always said that poor women are very busy. 2) Groups tend to exclude individualist (sometimes they are called as entrepreneurs) who dare to be different, to do mad things like starting new types of businesses, which may even create jobs for others. 3) Men are generally bad at working in groups, and they take bigger risk and are less reliable than women, but when they do succeed they tend to create more jobs than women do, for the vast majority who prefer to employed than to be self-employed.'
2. In Andhra Pradesh (Indira Kranti Pathaam) and Kerala (Kudumbashree) the experiment with mass SHG program has shown positive results, the same need not happen in other states. In these two states the programs were led and supported by brilliant and committed officers and they had long tenure in that organization/position. The same cannot be expected in all states.
