= Women in Kerala =

Group in the Indian state

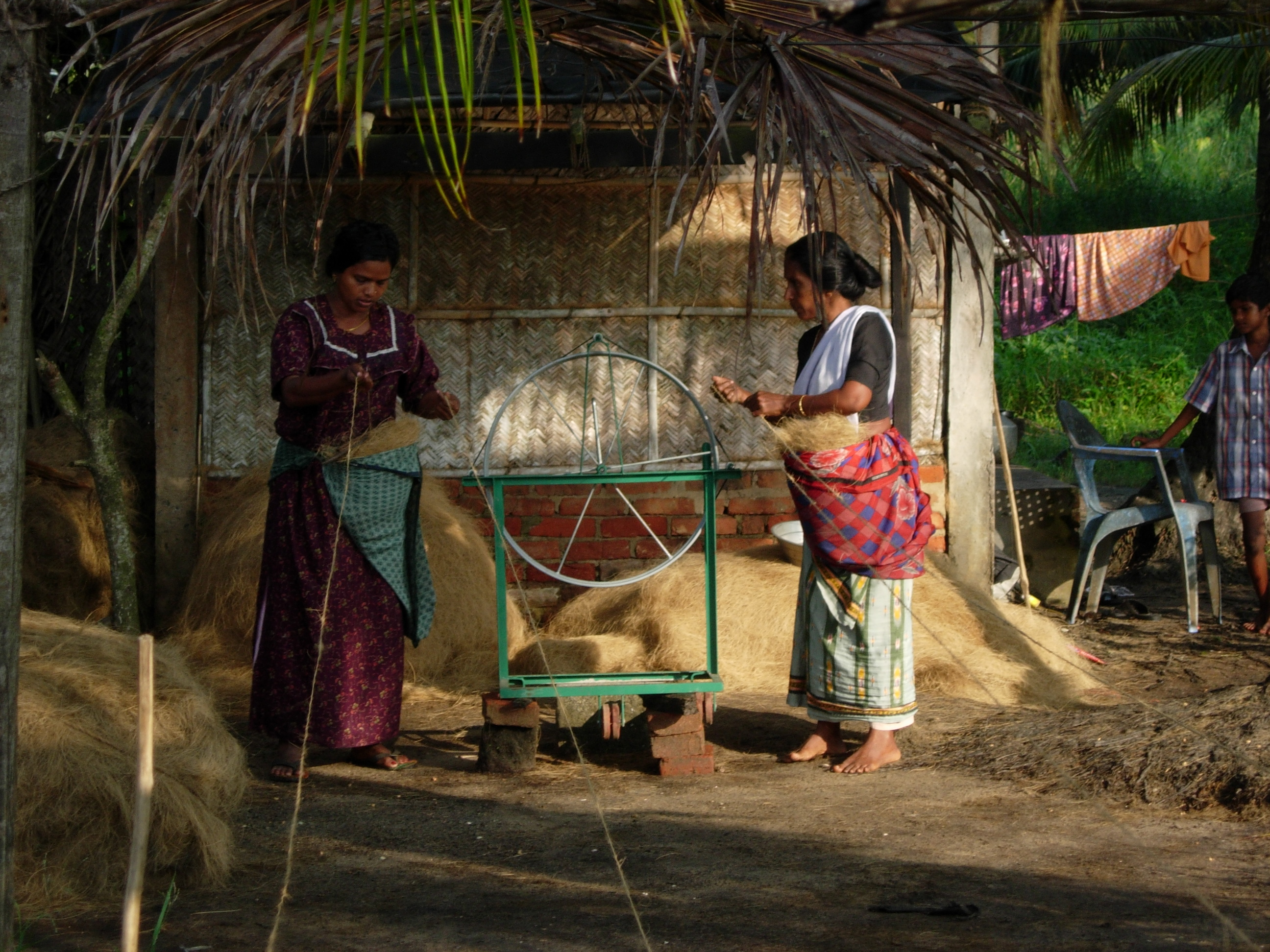
Women at work in a small scale coir spinning unit at Kollam.jpg

Women in Kerala are women who live in, come from, or are otherwise connected to the Indian state of Kerala. Kerala records some of the strongest social indicators for women in India, including high female literacy, low fertility, and a sex ratio that favours women. The rate of female participation in paid work, by contrast, is comparatively low. This combination of strong social development and weak economic and political participation is often described as a paradox of the Kerala model.

== Demographics ==
According to the 2011 Census of India, Kerala's sex ratio was 1,084 females per 1,000 males, the highest of any Indian state at that time. The same census recorded female literacy in Kerala at 92.1% and male literacy at 96.1%, both the highest among the states.

The National Family Health Survey (NFHS-5), conducted in 2019–21, found that 98.3% of women aged 15–49 in Kerala were literate and that 77.0% had completed ten or more years of schooling. It also reported that 6.3% of women aged 20–24 had been married before the age of 18, a standard measure of child marriage.

== History and social structure ==
Kerala's social history includes inheritance and family systems that differed from the patrilineal norm common elsewhere in India. The Nair community was traditionally matrilineal, with property held jointly within the extended family, although the oldest man usually acted as the legal head of the family group.

In the early nineteenth century, Channar women in Travancore fought for the right to cover the upper body, which was then treated as a privilege of upper-caste women. The decades-long agitation, known as the Channar revolt or upper-cloth revolt, eventually secured Nadar women the right to dress as they chose.

Colonial and post-independence legislation gradually dismantled the matrilineal arrangements. The Kerala Joint Hindu Family System (Abolition) Act, 1975 ended the joint family system among Hindus in the state. It covered joint family units such as the tarwad and thavazhi that had been governed by earlier Marumakkathayam and Travancore–Cochin family law, and it repealed several of those older statutes.

The matrilineal system had largely disintegrated over the course of the twentieth century, and its last legal vestiges were removed when the abolition legislation came into force in 1976. Legacies of matriliny nevertheless endured, continuing to influence civil-law disputes, employment patterns, and the disposal of personal property in Kerala long after formal abolition.

== Education ==
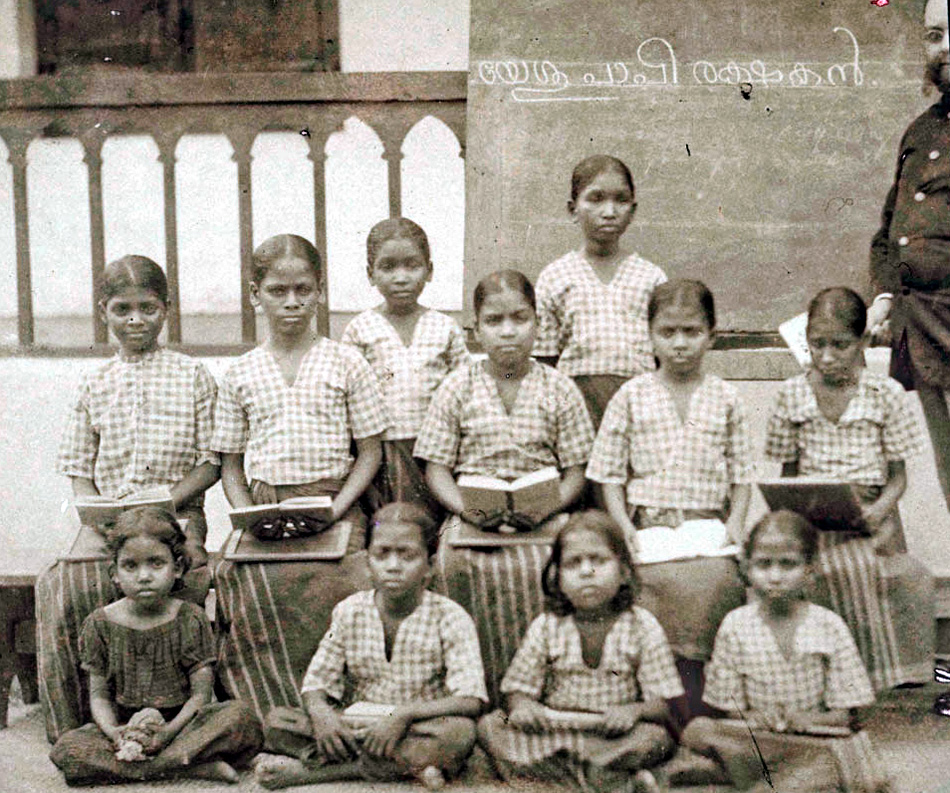
A school photo of girl students from Kerala (1914)

Kerala has long recorded female educational attainment well above the Indian average. Census 2011 put female literacy in the state at 92.1%, against a national figure of 64.6%. NFHS-5 found literacy among women aged 15–49 at 98.3%, with 77.0% having completed at least ten years of schooling.

== Health ==
=== Reproductive and maternal health ===
NFHS-5 recorded a total fertility rate of 1.8 children per woman in Kerala in 2019–21, below the replacement level and lower than the national average. Use of maternal health services was high: 99.8% of births took place in a health facility, and 78.6% of mothers had four or more antenatal care visits. The survey also reported anaemia in 36.3% of women aged 15–49 and in 31.4% of pregnant women.

=== Mental health ===
Kerala's strong physical-health indicators coexist with a high burden of mental illness. The National Mental Health Survey of 2015–16 estimated the lifetime prevalence of mental disorders in Kerala at 14.1%, slightly above the national figure of 13.7%, with depressive and stress-related disorders among the most common conditions. Mental-health problems are more common among women than among men in the state, particularly among adults and the elderly. Kerala also records one of the higher suicide rates among Indian states, a pattern that has drawn attention given the state's otherwise favourable social indicators.

== Marriage and family ==
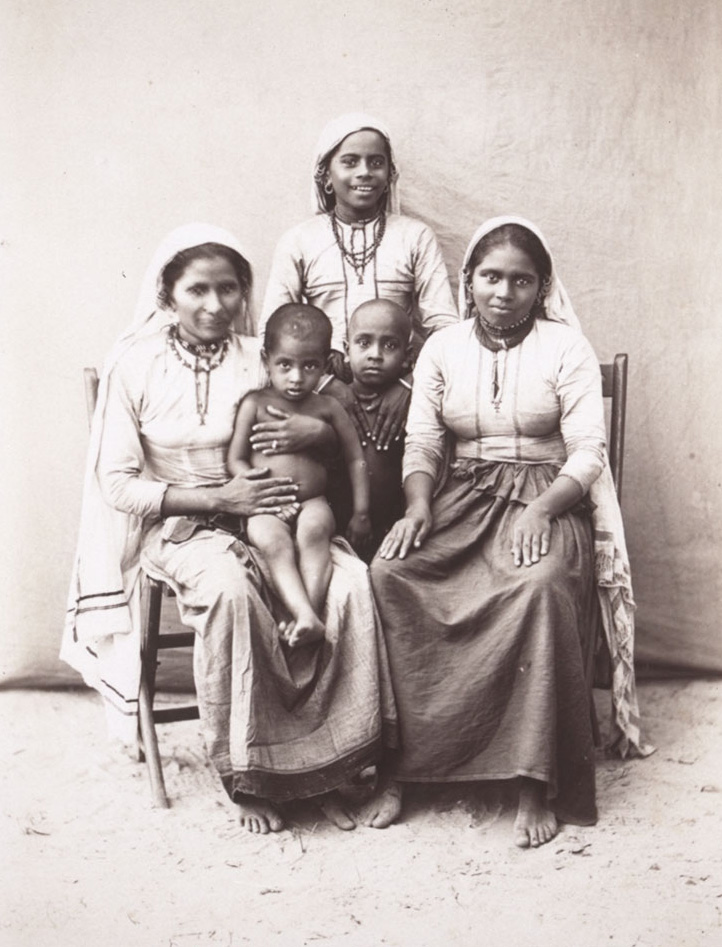
Muslim women of Kerala in 1901

=== Marriage and divorce ===
Women in Kerala marry later than the Indian average. The NFHS-5 state report put the median age at first marriage for women aged 25–49 at 21.5 years, and 6.3% of women aged 20–24 had married before the legal age of 18.

Divorce has risen sharply. The number of cases filed in the state's family courts grew by about 40% between 2016 and 2022, from 19,233 to 26,976, among the highest counts in India. Rising education and employment among women have made it easier to leave unhappy or abusive marriages, contributing to the increase.

=== Dowry ===
Although the Dowry Prohibition Act, 1961 bans the giving and taking of dowry, the practice remains widespread across communities in Kerala. Data on about 40,000 marriages between 1960 and 2008 show stark and persistent dowry inflation in Kerala from the 1970s onward, and in recent years the state has had the highest average dowry in India. Dowry-related abuse has continued despite the prohibition. The 2021 death of Vismaya Nair, a 24-year-old woman whose family had given a car, gold, and land at her marriage, drew national attention and prompted the Kerala government to announce stronger measures against the practice.

=== Gender-based violence ===
Women in Kerala are covered by national legislation on violence against women, including the Protection of Women from Domestic Violence Act, 2005. In NFHS-5, 9.9% of ever-married women aged 18–49 in the state reported having experienced spousal physical or sexual violence, and 0.5% of ever-married women reported physical violence during a pregnancy.

== Work and economic participation ==
=== Labour force ===
Despite high levels of education, official data show a low rate of female participation in the labour force in Kerala. In the Periodic Labour Force Survey (PLFS) for 2023–24, the female labour force participation rate in Kerala was 33.4% on the usual status measure (all ages, rural and urban combined), compared with a male rate of 59.1%. The same source reported an unemployment rate of 11.6% among women in the state, against 4.4% among men. NFHS-5 separately found that 25.8% of women aged 15–49 who had worked in the previous 12 months were paid in cash.

=== Migration ===
Large-scale male emigration to the Persian Gulf states has reshaped family life in Kerala. Around one million married women in the state have lived apart from migrant husbands. These so-called "Gulf wives" often faced loneliness and heavier household responsibilities, but many also gained autonomy, status, and experience in managing family affairs.

Women from Kerala also migrate in large numbers themselves, most visibly as nurses. For many Malayali nurses, Gulf employment serves as a deliberate mobility strategy and a stepping stone towards Western countries and greater personal autonomy.

=== Financial inclusion and technology ===
NFHS-5 found that 78.5% of women aged 15–49 in Kerala had a bank or savings account that they themselves used, and that 86.6% had a mobile phone of their own.

== Public life ==
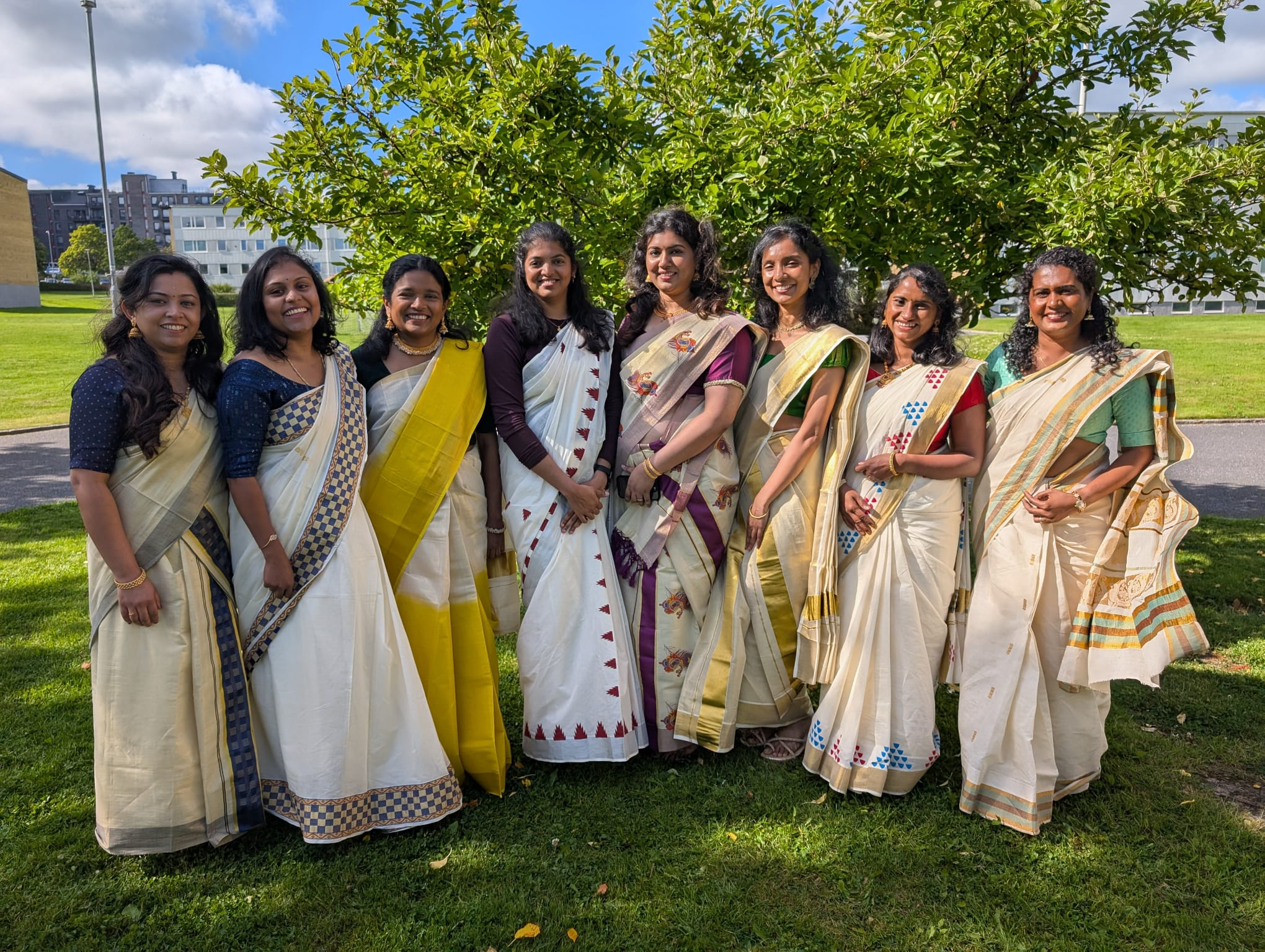
Kerala women wearing traditional clothing

=== Politics and representation ===
Reservation of seats for women has shaped female representation in Kerala's local bodies. A 33% reservation for women in local self-government institutions was introduced in 1994 and raised to 50% in 2010. As a result, more than half of the seats in panchayats and municipalities are held by women, while women's share of the state legislature has never exceeded 10%.

In the 2021 assembly election, 11 women were elected to the 140-member Kerala Legislative Assembly, the first double-digit tally since 2001. Between 1957 and 2021, only eight women served as cabinet ministers in the state. K. R. Gouri Amma became Kerala's first woman minister in the state's first cabinet in 1957, holding the revenue portfolio and piloting the landmark land-reform legislation. The council of ministers formed in May 2021 included three women, the highest number in recent times. In the 2026 election, 11 women were again elected to the 140-member assembly, among them Fathima Thahliya of the Indian Union Muslim League, the party's first woman MLA.

=== Community organisations and programmes ===
Kudumbashree, a poverty eradication and women empowerment programme implemented by the State Poverty Eradication Mission of the Government of Kerala, is among the best known women-centred programmes in the state. Set up in 1997 and extended across the state between 2000 and 2002, it works through a three-tier structure of Neighbourhood Groups, Area Development Societies, and Community Development Societies. The programme has reshaped women's public participation in Kerala, and the figure of the "Kudumbashree woman" is often contrasted with the idealised "Kerala model woman".

=== Notable women ===
Women from Kerala have recorded a number of national firsts. Anna Chandy, the first woman in Kerala to earn a law degree, became India's first woman High Court judge when she was sworn in to the Kerala High Court in 1959. M. Fathima Beevi, born in Pandalam, became the first woman judge of the Supreme Court of India in 1989 and later served as Governor of Tamil Nadu.

In the independence movement, Accamma Cherian led the Travancore State Congress as its president in 1938 and headed a mass march to the Maharaja's palace, earning her the epithet "Jhansi Rani of Travancore".

In sport, the sprinter and hurdler P. T. Usha finished fourth in the 400 metres hurdles final at the 1984 Los Angeles Olympics and, in 2022, became the first woman president of the Indian Olympic Association.

Kaziah Liz Mejo is the first Malayali woman to win Miss Universe India in 2026.

== Government initiatives ==
- Women and Child Development Department (WCDD) is the nodal department of Government of Kerala responsible for the welfare, protection, and empowerment of women and children in the state. It is headed by the Minister for Women and Child Development, typically led by a Women Minister.
- In 1973, Kerala became the first state in India and also first in Asia to establish a women's police station with the inauguration of the Kozhikode Women's Police Station by Prime Minister Indira Gandhi. Women's police stations are staffed by women police personnel and deal primarily with crimes against women, while also providing a supportive environment for women seeking police assistance and promoting their safety. Kerala has a Vanitha Police Station in each of its 14 districts and District Women Cells, each headed by a woman police inspector, to address crimes against women and enhance their safety. The Pink Police Patrol, staffed by women police personnel, conducts patrols in cities and other public places to improve women's safety and provide assistance when required.
- The Priyadarshini Scheme was introduced by the United Democratic Front (UDF) government led by Chief Minister V. D. Satheesan in 2026. The scheme provides free travel for women and transgender persons on ordinary bus services operated by the Kerala State Road Transport Corporation (KSRTC).

== Key indicators ==
Indicator	Source (year)	Value
Sex ratio (females per 1,000 males)	Census 2011	1,084
Female literacy rate	Census 2011	92.1%
Total fertility rate	NFHS-5 (2019–21)	1.8
Institutional births	NFHS-5 (2019–21)	99.8%
Women (15–49) with anaemia	NFHS-5 (2019–21)	36.3%
Female labour force participation rate (usual status, all ages)	PLFS 2023–24	33.4%
Women in the Kerala Legislative Assembly	2026 election	11 of 140
