= M. A. Oommen =

Indian economist (born 1932)

- Born: 24 February 1932 (age 94); Venmony, Travancore, British India
- Citizenship: Indian

Academic background
- Influences: Jesus Christ, Karl Marx and Amartya Sen

Malayil Abraham Oommen (born 24 February 1932) is an eminent economist and academic from Kerala, India. He wrote several books and published many articles on issues such as democracy, development, decentralization and economy of Kerala and India. He has worked as economic adviser to many governments.

== Early life and education ==
M. A. Oommen was born on 24 February 1932 at Venmony in present-day Alappuzha district. His father M. O. Abraham was a school teacher. In his autobiography Ormmappadikal, he mentions that, after his own father, it was M. M. Thomas who shaped his outlook on life. Theologian M. M. Thomas introduced Socialist and other ideologies in his youth classes in Thiruvananthapuram.

Born into a conservative Christian family, Oommen is popularly referred as a "Christian socialist". Although Oommen some say he has had a Marxist and Socialist leaning, Congress leaders have also significantly benefited from his insights. People who know him well knows he is actually a pragmatist with a keen appreciation for uplifting the common man and influenced by his conservative upbringing.

Oommen done his college education at University College Thiruvananthapuram with economics as his area of specialization. After completing his master's degree in Economics with First Rank from Kerala University in 1954, he done his Ph.D. from Kerala University in 1968. He also studied Diploma in Economic Development, from Institute for the Study of Economic Development at Naples, Italy.

== Career ==
Oommen developed an accurate and scientific curriculum for the departments of economics in various universities of Kerala and also conducted financial planning for African countries such as Botswana. He has worked at the Institute for the Study of Economic Development in Naples, Italy, and at the Center for Economic Growth at Yale University. He is also an Honorary Professor, Centre for Development Studies, Thiruvananthapuram. He was the first teacher of the economics department at University of Kerala, was the first economics professor at University of Calicut and was the founder-director of the leading John Matthai Centre at Thrissur, Kerala.

Oommen has been appointed as economic adviser to the Botswana government, has publicly criticized the country's central budget for generously subsidizing businessmen. Following this, his tenure was cut short by the Botswana government and he returned to Kerala. Oommen also held several positions including chairman of Institute for Sustainable Development and Governance, Director of Institute of Management in Government (IMG), Chairman of the 4th State Finance Commission, Government of Kerala, and patron of Kerala Economic Association.

=== Writing career ===
Oommen became well known in the academic community for his comprehensive writing on key issues such as democracy, development and decentralization. He wrote more than 30 books in Malayalam and English and published 400 papers which collectively form a comprehensive economic history of Kerala's last 7 decades.

Former Kerala finance minister T. M. Thomas Isaac said that Oommen was one of the pioneers who wrote extensively on the role of land reform in Kerala enhancing the capacity of the people of Kerala and in removing the barriers to it. While he is proud of the changes that land reform has brought to Kerala, he is also one of the first scholars to point out its limitations, added Isaac.

Oommen's 2008 study on the role of the Kutumbashree movement in uplifting the social status of women in Kerala is important in this regard. This report has been prepared by studying 7000 Kudumbahsree member families.

== Works ==
=== Books ===
- Essay on Physical Decentralization to Local Governments.
- Democracy, Development and Decentralisation, collection of essays.
- Amartyāsennint̲e mānavika vikasanaśāstraṃ : oru āmukha paṭhanaṃ (in Malayalam) (2 ed.). Tiruvanantapuraṃ: Kerala Bhasha Institute. December 2018. ISBN 9788120045453. An Introductory Study on the Human Developmental Science of Amartya Sen.
- Keralam: Charitram, Varthamanam, Darshanam (in Malayalam) (3 ed.). Thrissur: Kerala Sastra Sahitya Parishad. 2018. ISBN 9789387807099.
- Kerala Economy Since Independence. Oxford & IBH Pub. Co. 1979. OCLC 5727876.
- Oommen, M. A (1998). Devolution of Resources to Rural Local Bodies: A Comparative Study of Select State Finance Commission Reports : Karnataka, Kerala, Punjab, Rajasthan, West Bengal. Institute of Social Science. OCLC 43513022.
- Oommen, M. A (1995). Crisis in India. Khama Publishers for Indian Political Economy Association. ISBN 978-81-85495-37-8. OCLC 32779244.
- Oommen, M. A (2015). Local Governments in the Fiscal Space of Indian Federalism: Towards More Rational Arrangements. Thiruvananthapuram: Research Unit on Local Self Governments, Centre for Development Studies. OCLC 952471091.
- Oommen, M. A (2009). Globalization in the Contemporary World: Towards a Christian Understanding. Mavelikkara: Vichara. OCLC 632234729.
- Issues in Teaching of Economics in Indian Universities. Oxford & IBH Pub. Co. 1987. ISBN 978-81-204-0203-4. OCLC 17264013.
- Oommen, M. A (1972). Small Industry in Indian Economic Growth a Case Study of Kerala. Distributors: Research Publications in Social Sciences. OCLC 590940756.
- Oommen, M. A (2000). Dreze-Sen Theory of Public Action and Kerala's Development Experience. New Delhi: Institute of Social Sciences. OCLC 434576415.
- Oommen, M. A (2004). Basic Services, Functional Assignments and Own Revenue of Panchayats: Some Issues in Fiscal Decentralization for the Consideration of the Twelfth Finance Commission. New Delhi: Institute of Social Sciences. OCLC 270987503.
- Oommen, M.A.; George, Mary (2010). District Planning Methodology and Agenda for Action: Report of the Conference, 28-29 August 2009, Kollam, Kerala. New Delhi: Institute of Social Sciences. OCLC 799484149.
- Oommen, M. A (1975). A Study On Land Reforms in Kerala. Oxford & IBH Publ. Co. OCLC 471659182.
- Oommen, M. A (1993). Essays on Kerala Economy. Oxford & Ibh. ISBN 978-81-204-0816-6. OCLC 471707881.
- Oommen, M. A (1995). Crisis in India. New Delhi: Khama. ISBN 978-81-85495-37-8. OCLC 471715786.
- Oommen, M. A (1973). Development: Perspectives and Problems. Madras: Christian Literature Society. OCLC 717935663.
- Oommen, M. A (1994). Transnational Capital, GATT/WTO, and the Crisis of National Sovereignty: The Case of India. New Delhi: Institute of Social Sciences. OCLC 605307529.
- Oommen, M. A (2008). Micro Finance and Poverty Alleviation: The Case of Kerala's Kudumbashree. Kochi: Centre for Socio-Economic & Environmental Studies. OCLC 951612456.
- Oommen, M. A (2010). The Economy of Thiruvananthapuram. Banglore: Centre for Budget and Policy Studies. OCLC 659307701.
- Oommen, M. A; Joseph, K. V (1981). Economics of Film Industry in India. Academic Press. OCLC 1129471757.
- Oommen, M. A (1991). Economics of Indian Cinema. Oxford & IBH Pub. Co. ISBN 978-81-204-0575-2. OCLC 25410551.
- Rethinking Development: Kerala's Development Experience. Institute of Social Sciences [and] Concept Pub. Co. 1999. ISBN 978-81-7022-766-3. OCLC 43905040.
- A Decade of Decentralisation in Kerala: Experience and Lessons. Har-Anand Publications. 2007. OCLC 155760187.
- Oommen, M. A (1971). Land Reforms and Socio-Economic Change in Kerala: An Introductory Study. Published for the Christian Institute for the Study of Religion and Society by the C[hristian] L[iterature] S[ociety. OCLC 1129473836.
- Oommen, M. A; Mathew, George (2015). Development, Decentralisation and Democracy: Essays for M.A. Oommen. ISBN 978-81-250-5877-9. OCLC 921368054.
- Oommen, M.A.; Datta, Abhijith (1995). Panchayats and their finance. Institute of Social Sciences & Concept Pub. Co. ISBN 978-81-7022-568-3. OCLC 34518023.
- Oommen, M. A; Shyjan, D. (2014). Local governments and the inclusion of the excluded: towards a strategic methodology with empirical illustration. OCLC 951784153.
- Oommen, M. A; Ngcongco, L. D (1983). Botswana's economy since independence. New Delhi: Tata McGraw-Hill. OCLC 609802284.
- Oommen, M. A; Institute of Social Sciences (New Delhi, India) (2000). Eleventh Finance Commission's (EFC) transfer system and the local bodies: a critique. New Delhi: Institute of Social Sciences. OCLC 434576406.
- Oommen, M. A (1997). Foreign aid and poverty reduction: a critique of the Indian perspective. OCLC 474479809.
- Oommen, M. A (2007). A Decade of decentralisation in Kerala: experience and lessons. New Delhi: Har-Anand Publications. ISBN 978-81-241-1222-9. OCLC 1292012799.
- Oommen, M. A (1993). The political economy of globalisation. New Delhi: Institute of Social Sciences. OCLC 954282847.
- Oommen, M. A (1973). The obstacles to land reform in the south Indian state of Kerala. Institut international des civilisations differentes. OCLC 32495052.
- Oommen, M. A (2004). Economic justice, globalisation, and quest for alternatives. Konark Publishers. ISBN 978-81-220-0671-1. OCLC 835063615.
- Oommen, M. A (1995). Devolution of resources from the state to the Panchayati Raj institutions: search for a normative approach. New Delhi: Institute of Social Sciences. OCLC 474753006.
- Oommen, M. A (1996). Panchayati raj development report 1995. New Delhi: Institute of Social Sciences. OCLC 474755933.

=== Autobiography ===
Ōrmmappaṭikaḷ (in Malayalam). Kottayam, Kerala State, India: D. C. Books. January 2020. ISBN 9789353901783.

== Awards and honours ==
- He is the first honorary distinguished fellow of Gulati Institute of Finance and Taxation.
- Honorary fellow of Centre for Development Studies, Government of Kerala.
- Rockefeller Foundation Post-Doctoral Award 1968
- Senior Fulbright Scholarship (1974–75)

== Works on him ==
- M.A. Oommen: the man and the economist. Institute of Social Sciences (New Delhi) and Vichara School of People's Economics (Mavelikara, India). 2012. ISBN 978-81-909138-5-0. OCLC 806291987. Festschrift of contributed articles for M.A. Oommen.
