= Deen Dayal Upadhyaya Antyodaya Yojana =

Indian government training initiative

Deen Dayal Upadhyaya Antyodaya Yojana (DAY)
- Owner: Ministry of Rural Development
- Country: India
- Prime Minister(s): Narendra Modi
- Budget: ₹3,000 crore (US$320 million) (2019 - 2020)
- Status: Active
- Website: aajeevika.gov.in

Deen Dayal Upadhyaya Antyodaya Yojana or DDUAY is one of the Government of India's schemes for helping the poor by providing skill training. It replaced Aajeevik. The Government of India has provisioned ₹500 crore (US$53 million) for the scheme. Its objective is to train a half million people in urban areas per annum from 2016. In rural areas the objective is to train 1 million people by 2017. Further, in urban areas, it aims to provide services like self-help group (SHG) promotion, training centres, vendor markets, and permanent shelters for homeless. The aim of the scheme is skill development of both rural and urban India as per requisite international standards.

== History ==
The initial scheme Swarnajayanti Gram Swarozgar Yojana (SGSY) was launched in 1999. It was renamed as National Rural Livelihood Mission in 2011. Finally they were merged into DDU-AY.

The SGSY was somewhat intended to provide self-employment to millions of villagers. The programme aims at bringing the assisted poor families above the poverty line by organising them into self-help groups (SHGs) through a mix of bank credit and government subsidy. The main aim of these SHGs was to bring these poor families above the poverty line and concentrate on income generation through combined effort. The Swarna Jayanti Swarozgar Yojna (SGSY) has been renamed as National Rural Livelihood Mission (NRLM). With this the scheme will be made universal, more focused and time bound for poverty alleviation by 2014.

== Purpose ==
"Extended to all the 4,041 statutory cities and towns of the country, DAY-NULM aims at reducing urban poverty by improving livelihood opportunities through skill training and skill upgradation for self-employment, subsidised bank loans for setting up micro-enterprises, organising urban poor into self-help groups, among others."

The scheme integrates two main components:

National Urban Livelihoods Mission (NULM): Focused on reducing poverty in urban areas by providing skill training, facilitating self-employment, and supporting micro-enterprises. It also addresses the needs of urban street vendors by providing access to suitable spaces, institutional credit, social security, and skills to tap into emerging market opportunities.

National Rural Livelihoods Mission (NRLM): Aimed at empowering the rural poor by promoting self-employment and skill-based wage employment opportunities, thereby improving their livelihoods on a sustainable basis.

== Provisions ==
The programme aims at bringing the assisted poor families above the poverty line.

- Skill training: The scheme provides skill training to the urban and rural poor in various trades and occupations. This training is provided through government-run training centers and private training institutes.
- Employment opportunities: The scheme provides employment opportunities to the urban and rural poor in various sectors. This is done through job fairs, placement drives, and partnerships with private companies.
- Financial assistance: The scheme provides financial assistance to the urban and rural poor to start their own businesses. This is done through loans, subsidies, and grants.
- Self-help groups (SHGs): The scheme promotes the formation of self-help groups (SHGs) among the urban and rural poor. These SHGs provide a platform for the poor to come together and work towards their economic and social empowerment.
- Shelter: The scheme provides shelter to the urban homeless. This is done through the construction of night shelters and affordable housing.
- Basic services: The scheme provides access to basic services such as sanitation, healthcare, and education to the urban and rural poor.

== Progress ==
From 2014 to 2016, skills have been imparted to 4.54 lakh urban poor, giving employment to one lakh (22%) such people. An amount of ₹5.51 billion (US$58 million) was lent to 73,746 beneficiaries at an interest rate of 7% for setting up individual micro-enterprises. Further ₹0.54 billion (US$5.7 million) was disbursed for setting up 2,527 group enterprises. According to the press release by the government, Tamil Nadu, Madhya Pradesh, Uttar Pradesh, Andhra Pradesh and Telangana aced the implementation of DAY-NULM for the period from 2014 to 2016.

=== Start-up village entrepreneurship programme ===
The SVEP is implemented by Deendayal Antyodaya Yojana –National Rural Livelihoods Mission (DAY-NRLM), Ministry of Rural Development, as a sub-scheme since 2016. Its aims are to support the rural poor come out of poverty, supporting them set up enterprises and provide support till the enterprises stabilize. SVEP focuses on providing self-employment opportunities with financial assistance and training in business management and soft skills while creating local community cadres for promotion of enterprises. It addresses three major pillars of rural start-ups namely – finances, incubation and skill ecosystems.
