= Kudumbashree =

Government programme in Kerala

- Formation: 17 May 1997
- Headquarters: Thiruvananthapuram
- Region served: Kerala
- Executive Director: H Dineshan IAS
- Parent organization: Local Self Government Department, Government of Kerala
- Website: https://www.kudumbashree.org/

Kudumbashree (IPA: [ku.ɖum.bɐʃ.riː]; means 'Prosperity of the family') is a poverty eradication and women empowerment programme implemented by the Government of Kerala. Kudumbashree has a three-tier structure for its women community network, with Neighborhood Groups at the lowest level, Area Development Societies at the middle level, and Community Development Societies at the local government level.

In 2012, Kudumbashree was recognized as a National Resource Organisation by Ministry of Rural Development , Government of India, under the National Rural Livelihood Mission to provide support to other States in their poverty eradication efforts.

The Silver Jubilee Celebrations of Kudumbashree was inaugurated by Droupadi Murmu, the president of India at Thiruvananthapuram on 17 March 2023.

As part of Kudumbashree's 25th anniversary, the Government of Kerala has issued orders that 17 May be celebrated as 'Kudumbashree Day' every year. Radioshree, Kudumbashree's online radio was also launched as part of Kudumbashree's 25th anniversary.

Kudumbashree's theme song (Mudra Geetham) was launched by Pinarayi Vijayan, Chief Minister, Government of Kerala during the 25th Anniversary Celebrations of Kudumbashree. Sreevalsan J Menon is the Music Director & is sung by K.S Chithra. The lyrics were written by Sreekala Devayanam.

== History ==
Kudumbashree was set up in 1997 following the recommendations of a three-member task force appointed by the State Government. Its formation was in the context of the devolution of powers to the Panchayat Raj Institutions (PRIs) in Kerala, and the People's Planning in Kerala, the campaign which attempted to draw up the Ninth Plan of the local governments from below through the PRIs.

Kudumbashree was launched following the 1996 People's Plan Campaign of the E. K. Nayanar Government. From the beginning, it has been functioning under the local self-government department by accepting financial support from the union government and National Bank for Agriculture and Rural Development (NABARD).

As of 31 March 2025, Kudumbashree has 1,070 CDS (Community Developments Society, 19,470 ADS (Area Development Society) and 3,17,724 NHGs (Neighborhood Groups) Kerala's 48 lakh women community network, which is spread across Kerala.

The Kudumbashree Mission was registered as a Charitable Society under the Travancore-Cochin Literary, Scientific and Charitable Societies Act of 1955 in November 1998. The mission was officially inaugurated by Atal Bihari Vajpayee, the then prime minister, Government of India on 17 May 1998 at Malappuram as requested by the Government of Kerala and the Mission started functioning on 1 April 1999 under the Local Self-Government Department of the Government of Kerala.

== Kudumbashree Mission ==
The State Poverty Eradication Mission (SPEM), popularly known as the Kudumbashree Mission, is the State Government's instrument for poverty eradication under the Local Self-Government Department.

The mission has a governing body chaired by the minister for local self-government and an executive committee chaired by the principal secretary, Local Self-Government Department. The mission is the agency that promotes and supports the Kudumbashree Community network.

The mission structure consists of a state mission and 14 district missions. The state mission in divided into three divisions – Livelihood Development, Organisation and Social Development, and Systems Support.

== Kudumbashree Community Network ==
The Kudumbashree community network has a three-tier structure. The neighborhood groups (NHGs) are the units at the primary level. The Area Development Societies (ADSs) form the middle tier of the network and Community Development Societies (CDSs) at the local government level.

As of 31 March 2025, Kudumbashree has 3,17,724 NHGs affiliated to 19,470 ADSs and 1,070 CDSs with a total membership of 48,08,837 women. Kudumbashree membership is open to all adult women, limited to one membership per family.

== Kudumbashree Auxiliary Groups ==
Out of the total NHG members, women between 18 and 40 years of age constitute 10% only. The limitations including giving membership only to one member per family, have been a reason for this. Because of this, a greater percentage of young women failed to get directly benefited out of the various programmes being implemented through Kudumbashree. As a solution, Kudumbashree formulated Auxiliary Groups and now the young women are offered an opportunity to become part of these Auxiliary Groups. The project aims at ensuring the social, cultural and livelihood upliftment of young women.

== Kudumbashree Special NHGs ==
To ensure the social inclusion of the transgender community, Kudumbashree had also started special NHGs for transgenders to give them an opportunity to find a steady livelihood of their own, and to lead a dignified life in the society.

Kudumbashree also associates with the Mahatma Gandhi National Rural Employment Guarantee Scheme (MGNREGS) in Kerala.

== Kudumbashree National Resource Organisation ==
Kudumbashree National Resource Organisation
- Formation: 2012
- Purpose: PRI-CBO Convergence, Enterprises
- Headquarters: Thiruvananthapuram
- Location: India
- Region served: Assam, Bihar, Gujarat, Jharkhand Karnataka, Maharashtra, Odisha, Rajasthan, Sikkim, Uttar Pradesh
- Affiliations: Kudumbashree, NRLM
- Website: www.keralanro.org

After its formation in 2012, the Kudumbashree NRO signed Memorandum of Understanding (MoUs) with 9 States (Assam, Bihar, Gujarat, Jharkhand, Karnataka, Maharashtra, Odisha, Rajasthan and Sikkim) to provide technical and implementation support to their State Rural Livelihood Missions (SRLMs) for the adaptation of Kudumbashree's best practices. Kudumbashree NRO provides assistance to States in undertaking pilot interventions under the Enterprises project and Panchayati Raj Institutions – Community Based Organisations (PRI-CBO) Convergence Project.

The Enterprises project identifies individuals from local communities and trains them for 6–9 months to form a cadre of community professionals called Micro-Enterprise Consultants (MEC). MEC are expected to provide hand holding support and capacity building services primarily to women entrepreneurs from rural areas in exchange for a fee. The Enterprises project is in the pilot phase in select districts of 7 States - Bihar, Gujarat, Jharkhand, Karnataka, Maharashtra, Rajasthan and Sikkim.

The PRI-CBO Convergence project identifies individuals from local communities and trains them to form a cadre of community professionals called Local Resource Groups (LRG). LRG are expected to work with community institutions and local governments to improve the efficiency and reach of poor centric programmes, promote participatory planning and inculcate democratic consciousness in local communities. The PRI-CBO Convergence project is in the pilot phase in select blocks of 7 States – Assam, Jharkhand, Karnataka, Maharashtra, Odisha, Rajasthan and Sikkim.

In 2015, Kudumbashree NRO entered into collaborations with Ethiopia and South Africa to provide support for the adaptation of Kudumbashree's best practices in these countries.

== Kudumbashree Awards ==
Kudumbashree constituted 'Kudumbashree Awards' as part of intensifying Kudumbashree project activities and honoring excellent and notable achievements. Awards are given in a total of 17 categories viz., Best NHG, Best ADS, Best Ooru Samithi, Best Enterprise Group, Best Entrepreneur, Best BUDS Institution, Best Gender Resource Centre, Best Auxiliary Group, Best Auxiliary Enterprise, Best Snehitha Gender Help Desk, District that has carried out the Best Public Relations Activities, Best District Mission, as well as Best CDS (Convergence Activities, Unique Activities, Administration-Microfinance Activities), Best CDS (Agriculture Sector, Animal Husbandry), Best CDS (Social Development, Gender), Best CDS (Tribal Activities), Best CDS (Micro Enterprise, DDU-GKY, K-DISC).

== Disaster Relief ==
2018 Kerala floods

During the 2018 Kerala floods, Kudumbashree contributed Rs 11.18 crores to Chief Minister's Distress Relief Fund (CMDRF).

COVID-19 pandemic

The organisation implemented the Chief Minister's ‘Sahayahastham’ (Helping Hands) Loan Scheme, made regular Communication with the community, focused especially on elderly care, extended special care for the vulnerable communities, extended counselling services, made use of the enterprise opportunities (production of masks, sanitizers and face shields, cloth bags for the Civil Supplies Department for distributing the food kits to the public, run Community Kitchens, launched Janakeeya Hotels across the state to serve meals at Rs 20, set up Take Away counters at state boundaries and food supply to Corona Care Centres etc.) and filling in the social needs and also involved in volunteering and other activities as well.

2024 Wayanad landslides

During 2024 Wayanad landslides, Kudumbashree contributed Rs 20,60,25,388 to Chief Minister's Distress Relief Fund (CMDRF). Kudumbashree also prepared the Micro Plans for those affected by the landslides associating with the District Administration of Wayanad.

== Arangu Arts Festival ==
Arangu Arts Festivals are organized to develop the creative skills of Kudumbashree NHG, Auxiliary Group members. The festival aims to showcase the artistic talents of Kudumbashree NHG-Auxiliary members and empower them through creative expression. The Arangu Arts Festival is organized at three levels-Taluk level, District level and State level.

This new format of Kudumbashree Arts Festival was launched in 2017. The State level Competitions of 2017 and 2018 were held at Alappuzha and Malappuram respectively. The State Level Competitions of 2019, 2023 and 2024 were held at Palakkad, Thrissur and Kasaragod respectively. From 2023 onwards, a Special Category was started for Auxiliary Group Members.

== Additional reading ==
- M. A. Oommen (April 2008). Micro-finance and Poverty Alleviation: The Case of Kerala's Kudumbashree (PDF). Kochi: Centre for Socio-econo mic & Environmental Studies (CSES).
- Glyn Williams, Binitha V. Thampi, D. Narayana, Sailaja Nandigama and Dwaipayan Bhattacharyya (1 August 2011). "Performing Participatory Citizenship – Politics and Power in Kerala's Kudumbashree Programme". The Journal of Development Studies. 47 (8): 1261–1280. doi:10.1080/00220388.2010.527949. S2CID 154562213.
